= Iowa Highway 340 =

Former state highway in Iowa, United States

Iowa Highway 340
- Iowa 340 highlighted in red

Route information
- Length: 2.231 mi (3.590 km)
- Existed: 1936–2003
- Tourist routes: Great River Road

Major junctions
- South end: Pikes Peak State Park
- North end: US 18 Bus. in McGregor

Location
- Country: United States
- State: Iowa
- Counties: Clayton

Highway system
- Iowa Primary Highway System; Interstate; US; State; Secondary; Scenic
← Iowa 330	→ Iowa 346

Iowa Highway 340 (Iowa 340) connected U.S. Highway 18 Business (US 18 Bus.) in McGregor to Pikes Peak State Park. It was designated in 1936 to connect Pikes Peak State Park to the primary highway system, which it did until it was turned over to Clayton County in 2003. It was turned over along with 700 miles (1,100 km) of other short highways that primarily served local traffic. It was mostly replaced by County Road X56. Aside from a short connector to the state park gate, the route was a part of the Great River Road.

== Route description ==
Iowa 340 began at the gate entrance to Pikes Peak State Park south of McGregor. It followed a two-fifths-mile-long (640 m) connector road to a T intersection, at which County Road X56 (CR X56) formed the southern leg and Iowa 340 continued on the northern leg. Now heading north, Iowa 340 took a series of curves and descended 300 feet (91 m) in elevation into the Mississippi River valley in which McGregor is nestled. Once in McGregor, the highway sharply turned left and ended at US 18 Business. Aside from the short road from CR X56 to the park entrance, the route was part of the Great River Road.

== History ==
Iowa 340 was designated in 1936 to connect Pikes Peak State Park to the primary highway system; it first appeared on the state map in 1937. For many years, it connected to U.S. Highway 18 (US 18) and Iowa 13 in McGregor. In 1969, the Iowa State Highway Commission shuffled around some route numbers, which resulted in Iowa 13 being pulled back to US 52 near Froelich. North of Marquette, Iowa 13 became Iowa 76. Twenty years later, Iowa 340's northern end would change again as US 18 was bypassed around the McGregor–Marquette area. The former US 18 became US 18 Business, though officially, Iowa 76 was extended south over the new business route.

In 2002, more than 700 miles (1,100 km) of low-traffic state highways, including Iowa 340, were identified by the Iowa Department of Transportation (Iowa DOT) because they primarily served local traffic. Typically, when Iowa DOT wished to transfer a road to a county or locality, both parties had to agree to terms and the DOT would have to either improve the road or give money to the other party to maintain the road. However, with the significant mileage the DOT wished to turn over, the Iowa General Assembly passed a law which granted the DOT a one-time exemption from the transfer rules effective July 1, 2003. Except for the short connector into Pikes Peak State Park, Iowa 340 was replaced by CR X56.

== Major intersections ==
The entire route was in Clayton County.

Location	mi	km	Destinations	Notes
Mendon Township	0.000	0.000	Pikes Peak State Park entrance	
Mendon Township	0.423	0.681	CR X56 south	
McGregor	2.231	3.590	US 18 Bus. (Main Street / Iowa 76)	
1.000 mi = 1.609 km; 1.000 km = 0.621 mi
