= Bear Creek (Upper Iowa River tributary) =

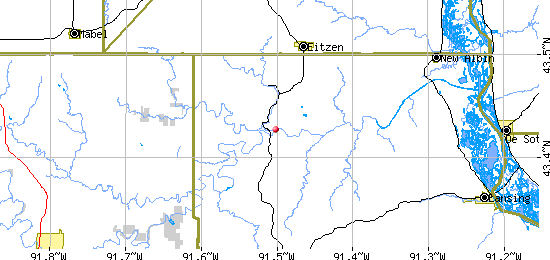
- Bear Creek (the red dot indicates the confluence between the creek and the Upper Iowa River)

Location
- Country: United States
- State: Iowa
- Counties: Winneshiek, Allamakee

Physical characteristics
- Source
  - coordinates: 43.4486°N 91.61556°W
- Mouth: Upper Iowa River
  - coordinates: 43.4266°N 91.5026°W
  - elevation: 663 ft (202 m)

Bear Creek is an 11.9-mile-long (19.2 km) tributary of the Upper Iowa River, joining Waterloo Creek for a short distance before entering the Upper Iowa in Waterloo Township just east of where Iowa Highway 76 crosses the river. Its branches are acclaimed trout fishing streams.

The main or South fork rises in Hesper and Highland Townships in Winneshiek County, and gives its name to South Bear Complex, maintained by the state of Iowa and flows in a rough west to east direction.

The North Bear Creek rises in Houston County, Minnesota, south of Spring Grove, entering Iowa into Highland Township in Winneshiek County, and joins the main branch just west of the Allamakee County line in a generally north-to-southeast direction; the state-maintained North Bear Complex is named for it.

The stream continues into Allamakee County, joining Waterloo Creek a short distance from where the two creeks merge with the Upper Iowa. The Upper Iowa itself continues towards its heads in a southwesterly direction.

== See also ==
- List of rivers of Iowa
