= State Line Slough =

State Line Slough may refer to:

- State Line Slough (Missouri), in Atchison County, Missouri
- State Line Slough (Iowa), in Clayton County, Iowa
