= Iowa Highway 76 =

State highway in Iowa, United States

Iowa Highway 76
- Iowa 76 highlighted in red

Route information
- Maintained by Iowa DOT
- Length: 48.911 mi (78.715 km)
- Existed: January 1, 1969–present

Major junctions
- South end: US 18 west of McGregor
- US 18 at Marquette; Iowa 9 at Waukon
- North end: MN 76 at Eitzen, MN

Location
- Country: United States
- State: Iowa
- Counties: Clayton; Allamakee

Highway system
- Iowa Primary Highway System; Interstate; US; State; Secondary; Scenic
← US 75	→ US 77

Iowa Highway 76 (Iowa 76) is a state highway located in northeastern Iowa, most of which is in Allamakee County. The 49-mile-long (79 km) highway connects McGregor to Eitzen, Minnesota via Waukon. It begins in McGregor at an intersection with U.S. Highway 18; the first 4 1/4 miles (6.8 km) of the route are signed as U.S. Highway 18 Business (US 18 Bus.). It crosses into Minnesota near Eitzen and continues as Trunk Highway 76.

== Route description ==
Iowa Highway 76 begins as U.S. Highway 18 Business at U.S. Highway 18 west of McGregor. The route descends into the Mississippi River valley along the northern border of Pikes Peak State Park and then turns into McGregor. Through McGregor, US 18 Bus. heads to the northeast towards the Mississippi River. Along the river, the highway is parallel to the Dakota, Minnesota and Eastern Railroad (DM&E Railroad). For one mile (1.6 km), US 18 Bus. travels a narrow strip of land between the river and the bluffs where it passes the Isle of Capri casino.

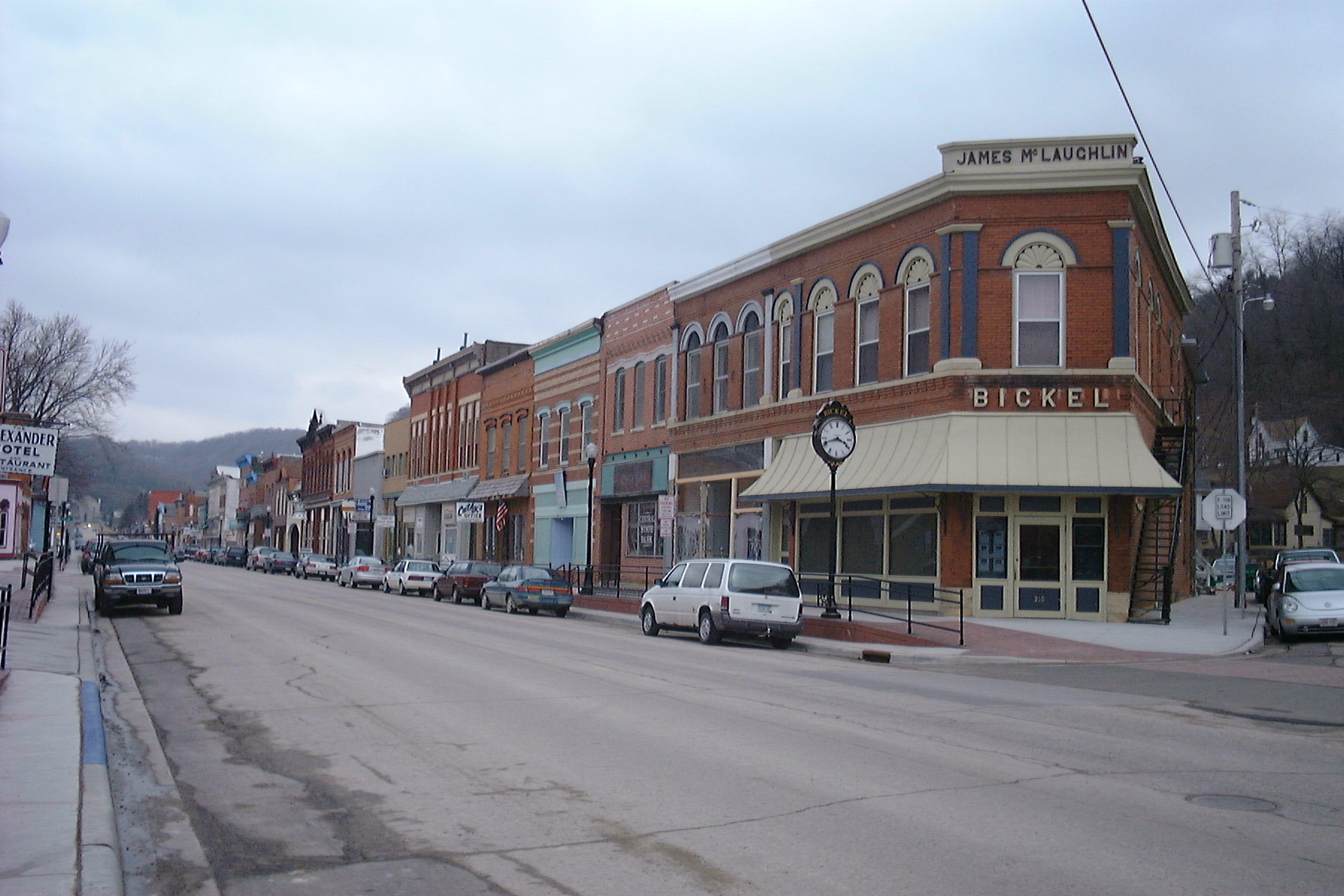
Iowa 76, as U.S. Highway 18 Business, through McGregor

At Marquette, US 18 Bus. ends at the foot of the Marquette–Joliet Bridge, which carries US 18 to Prairie du Chien, Wisconsin. At US 18, Iowa 76 appears for the first time and continues to the north. Between Marquette and the mouth of the Yellow River, Iowa 76 runs parallel to the DM&E Railroad along the western bank of the Mississippi River. It turns inland near Effigy Mounds National Monument, turning to the northwest towards Waukon. It passes near the Yellow River State Forest and through the unincorporated community of Rossville.

South of Waukon, Iowa 76 intersects Iowa 9. Eastbound Iowa 9 and northbound Iowa 76 head north together for two miles (3.2 km). At Main Street, the two highways split; Iowa 9 continues north while Iowa 76 heads west for a few blocks before turning north itself. From the western edge of Waukon, it travels north into the rolling hills of the Driftless Area, an area of the Midwestern United States which was untouched by glaciation in the last ice age. The highway descends into the Upper Iowa River valley where it crosses the Upper Iowa and its tributaries, Bear Creek and Waterloo Creek. Iowa 76 follows Waterloo Creek for 2 1/2 miles (4.0 km) until they near the unincorporated community of Dorchester. From Dorchester, the highway curves to the east and north, traveling 6 miles (9.7 km) to the Minnesota state line south of Eitzen.

== History ==
Iowa Highway 76 was created in 1969 from a segment of Iowa Highway 13 from Marquette to Minnesota. Iowa 13's northernmost 55 miles (89 km) were truncated at a point 8 miles (13 km) west of McGregor at its intersection with U.S. Highway 52. Iowa 13 overlapped US 52 and US 18 for 11 miles (18 km); the remaining 44 miles (71 km) became Iowa 76.

In 1989, Iowa 76 was extended 4 1/4 miles (6.8 km) to the south when a new bypass around McGregor was opened. US 18 was moved onto the bypass and the old road became Iowa 76, but was marked as U.S. Highway 18 Business. The only proof of Iowa 76 along US 18 Bus. are small Iowa 76 route markers above the mile markers.

== Major intersections ==
County	Location	mi	km	Destinations	Notes
Clayton	Mendon Township	0.000	0.000	US 18 – Monona, Marquette	
Clayton	McGregor	2.223	3.578	Great River Road south / CR X56 south (7th Street)	Southern end of Great River Road overlap, former Iowa 340 south;
Clayton	Marquette	4.149	6.677	To US 18 (Marquette–Joliet Bridge) – Prairie Du Chien	Interchange
Allamakee	Fairview Township	10.716	17.246	Great River Road north / CR X52 north – Harpers Ferry, Lansing	Northern end of Great River Road overlap; former Iowa 364 north
Allamakee	Jefferson Township	27.250	43.855	Iowa 9 west – Decorah	Southern end of IA 9 overlap
Allamakee	Waukon	29.255	47.081	Iowa 9 east (Allamakee Street)	Northern end of IA 9 overlap
Allamakee	Union City Township	48.911	78.715	MN 76 north – Caledonia	
1.000 mi = 1.609 km; 1.000 km = 0.621 mi

== Gallery ==
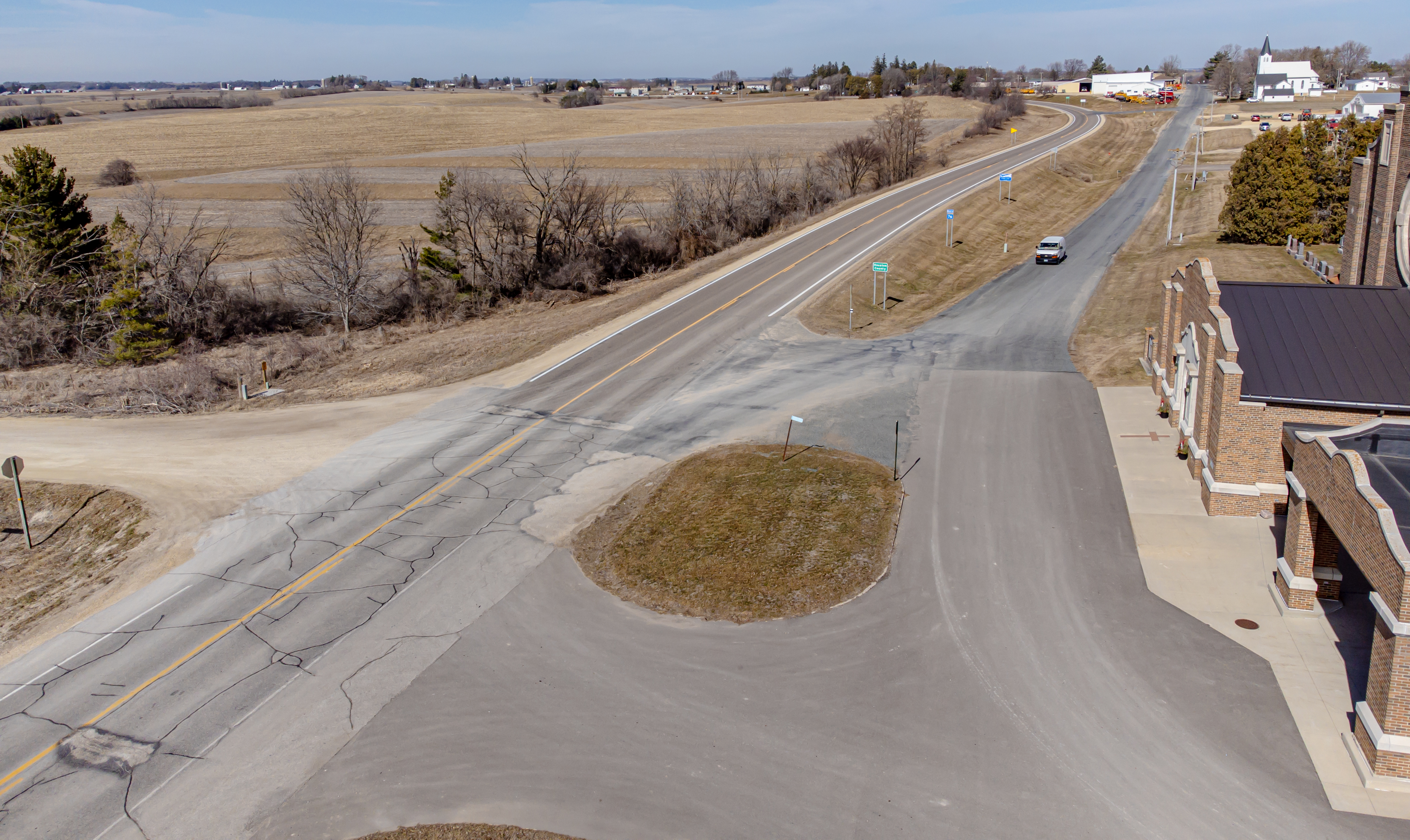
IA-76 northern terminus south of Eitzen, MN

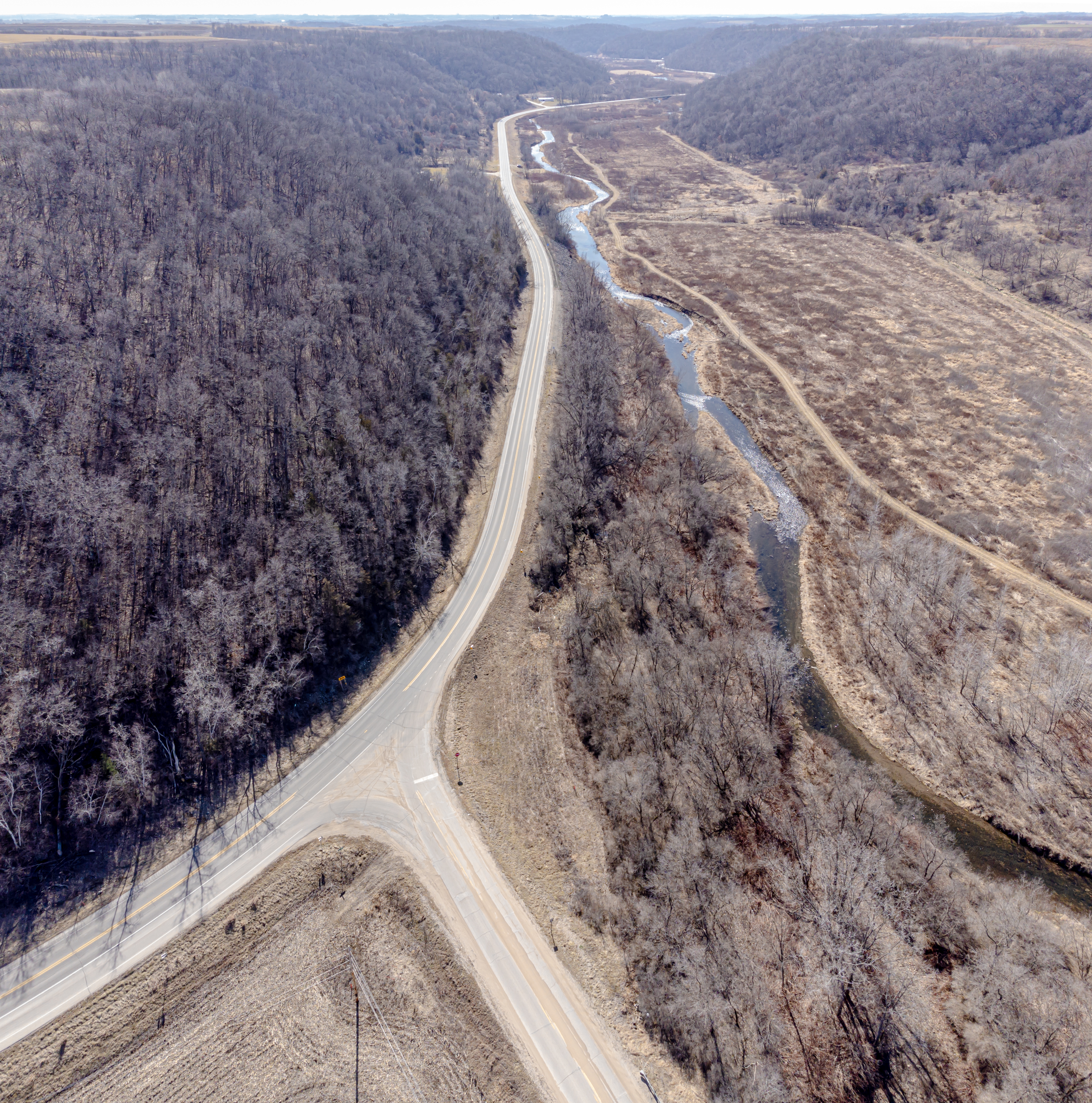
IA-76 near Dorchester, Iowa. running along Waterloo Creek.
