= American House =

- U.S. National Register of Historic Places
- U.S. Historic district – Contributing property
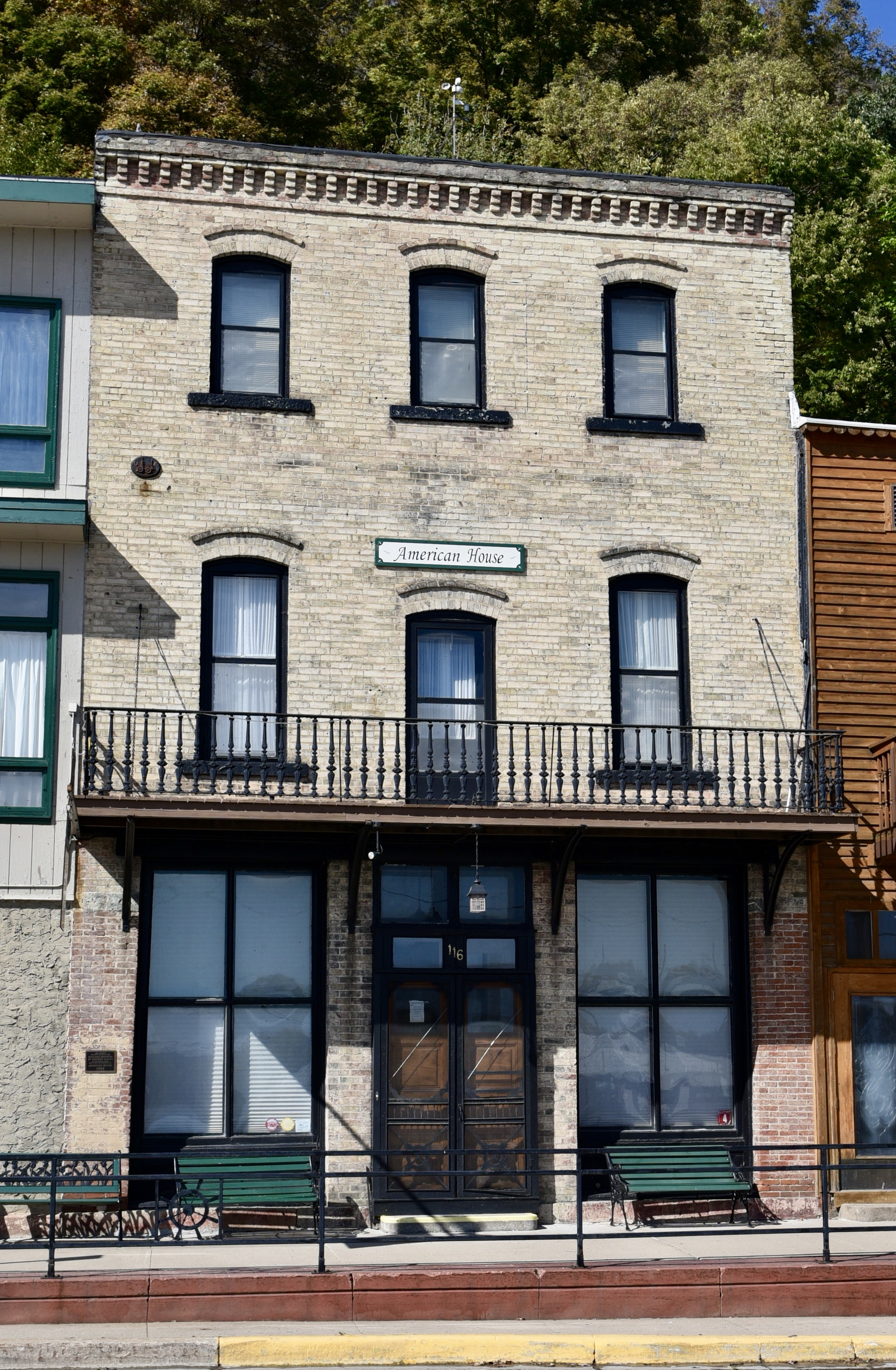

- Location within Iowa Location within the United States
- Location: 116 Main St. McGregor, Iowa
- Coordinates: 43°01′34.4″N 91°10′26″W
- Area: less than one acre
- Built: 1854
- Part of: McGregor Commercial Historic District (ID02001033)
- NRHP reference No.: 01000913
- Added to NRHP: August 30, 2001

The American House, also known as the American Hotel, Evans Hotel, and Ryan House, is a historic building located in McGregor, Iowa, United States. Ohio native William H. Harding had the three-story structure built in 1854. It is a stone building that is covered with a brick veneer on the upper two floors. McGregor was a river port that immigrants used to get to western Iowa, southern Minnesota and points west. In the early years most people came to town via ferry or packet boats on the Mississippi River. They would leave by horse, stagecoach, wagon or train. The stagecoach departed from in front of the hotel. The ticket office for the railroad, which was located across Main Street, was established in the hotel lobby. An addition was constructed on the southwest side of the original building. The sunrooms were built above it in the 1970s and 1980s. The building was individually listed on the National Register of Historic Places in 2001. In 2002 it was listed as a contributing property in the McGregor Commercial Historic District.
