= Goedert Meat Market =

- Formerly listed on the U.S. National Register of Historic Places
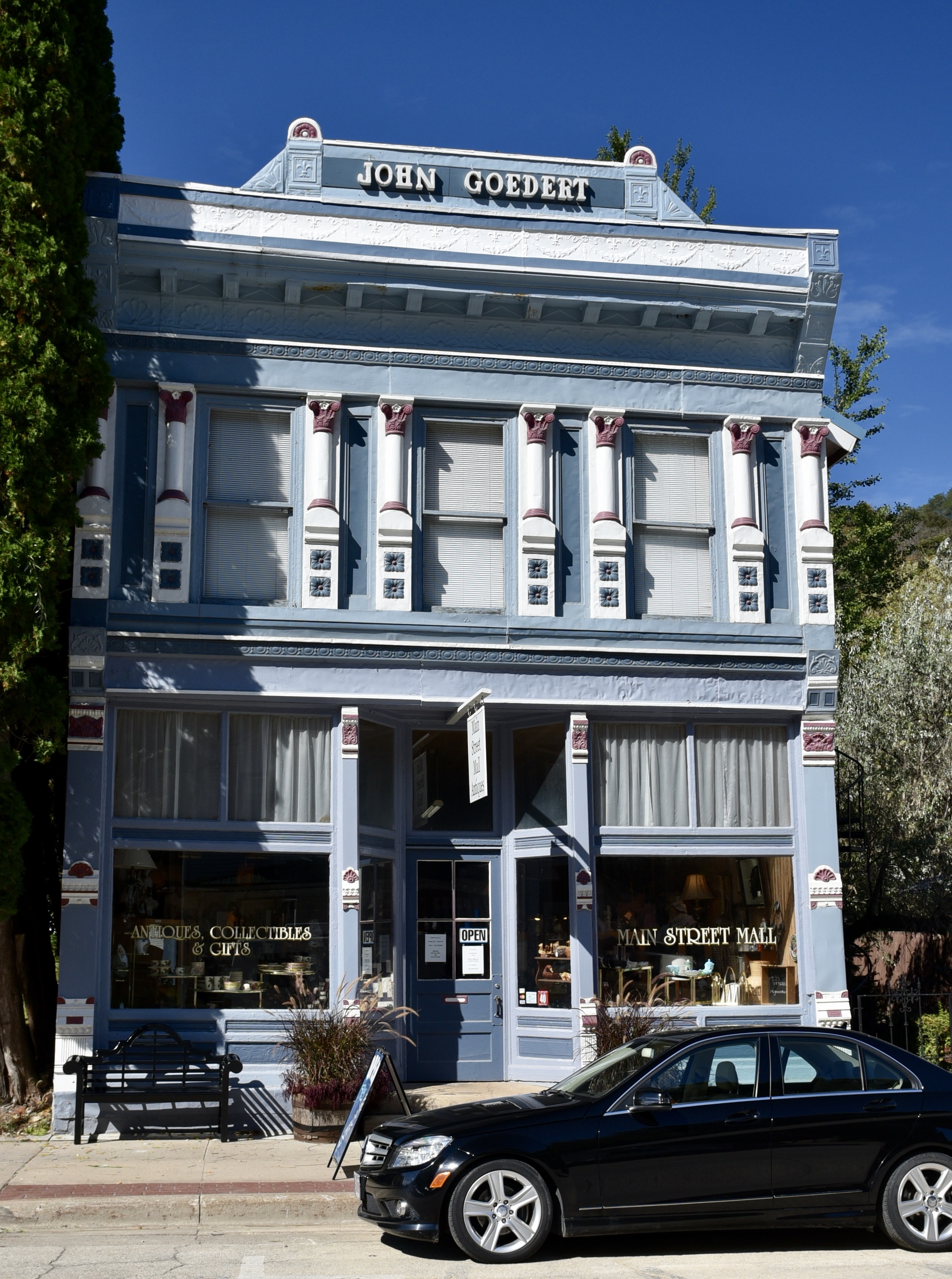

- Location within Iowa Location within the United States
- Location: 322 Main St. McGregor, Iowa
- Coordinates: 43°01′22″N 91°10′40″W
- Area: less than one acre
- Built: 1889-1890
- Architectural style: Italianate
- Part of: McGregor Commercial Historic District (ID02001033)
- NRHP reference No.: 96001159

Significant dates
- Added to NRHP: October 18, 1996
- Removed from NRHP: September 8, 2022

The Goedert Meat Market, also known as the Main Street Mall, is a historic building located in McGregor, Iowa, United States. The two-story, single-unit, brick building was completed in 1890 in the Italianate style. It maintains the only complete cast-iron storefront in town. The storefront was manufactured by Mesker Bros. Front Builders of St. Louis, Missouri. The facility dates from the time when all aspects of the meat business from slaughter, to processing, to sales were housed in one building. The New York–style meat market was built for John Goedert, who maintained his residence upstairs. By the turn of the 20th-century it housed Bergman's deli/butcher shop, and remained a butcher shop until 1944. The building was individually listed on the National Register of Historic Places (NRHP) in 1996. In 2002 it was listed as a contributing property in the McGregor Commercial Historic District.

The building was hit by an EF-1 tornado and collapsed on the evening of July 19, 2017. It was removed from the NRHP in 2022.
