= X56 =

X56 may refer to:

- County Road X56 (Clayton County, Iowa) in McGregor to Pikes Peak State Park
- Lockheed Martin X-56, modular unmanned aerial vehicle designed to explore High-Altitude Long Endurance flight technologies
