= Waterloo Township =

Waterloo Township may refer to:

== Canada ==
- Waterloo Township, Ontario, defunct; dissolved following the creation of Waterloo Region

== United States ==
- Waterloo Township, Fayette County, Indiana
- Waterloo Township, Allamakee County, Iowa
- Waterloo Township, Lyon County, Kansas
- Waterloo Township, Jackson County, Michigan
- Waterloo Township, Cavalier County, North Dakota, in Cavalier County, North Dakota
- Waterloo Township, Athens County, Ohio

== See also ==
- Waterloo (disambiguation)
