= Diamond Jo Boat Store and Office =

- U.S. National Register of Historic Places
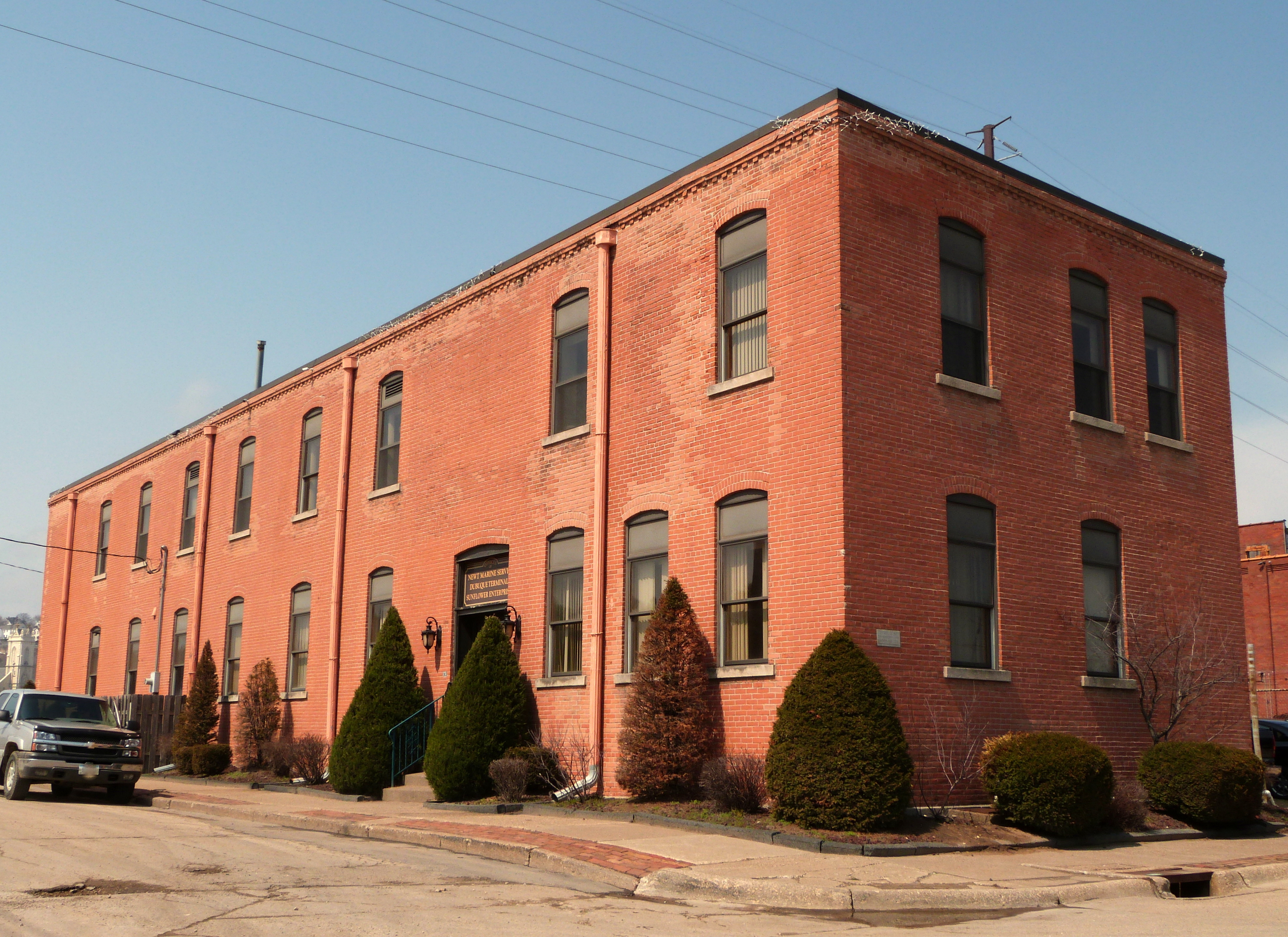

- Location within Iowa Location within the United States
- Location: Jones and Water Sts. Dubuque, Iowa
- Coordinates: 42°29′35″N 90°39′32.5″W
- Area: less than one acre
- Built: 1885
- Architect: Joseph Reynolds
- NRHP reference No.: 77000512
- Added to NRHP: November 23, 1977

The Diamond Jo Boat Store and Office, also known as the Dubuque Tank Terminal Co. and Inland Molasses Co. Operations Office, is a historic building located in Dubuque, Iowa, United States. It is the last remaining structure in the city that is associated with the steamboat era on the Mississippi River. Several other buildings associated with this line were destroyed in a fire in 1909. The building housed the headquarters of the Diamond Jo Line from the mid-1880s until it was sold to the Streckfus Line in 1911. Originally headquartered in McGregor, Iowa, Joseph Reynolds started in the steamboat business after the American Civil War shipping wheat between Minnesota and the Chicago and Northwestern railhead at Fulton, Illinois. In the last quarter of the 19th century, the Diamond Jo Packet Line was one of the most active steamboat lines on the upper Mississippi. As railroads gradually took freight business away from steamboats, Reynolds started to build passenger boats and he bought boats from other lines. The offices were located on the east end of the simple, two-story, brick building, and the rest was used for storage. The building was listed on the National Register of Historic Places in 1974. The structure resides at the corner of Jones and Water St. in Dubuque Iowa.

== See also ==
- Joseph "Diamond Jo" Reynolds Office Building and House in McGregor, Iowa
