= Hot Springs Railroad =

Railroad line

Overview
- Headquarters: Malvern
- Locale: Arkansas
- Dates of operation: 1876–1964
- Successor: Arkansas Midland Railroad

Technical
- Track gauge: 1,435 mm (4 ft 8 1/2 in) standard gauge
- Previous gauge: Narrow Gauge
- Length: 21 miles (34 km)

The Hot Springs Railroad ran between Malvern, Arkansas and Hot Springs.

== Information ==
It was sometimes called the "Diamond Jo Line" because of its developer and sole owner, Joseph "Diamond Jo" Reynolds. Reynolds was a successful steamboat operator from Chicago, Illinois, and came to be known as the "Steamboat King." He gained the nickname "Diamond Jo" by marking his steamboats with the name "Jo" surrounded by a diamond. On a trip to Hot Springs, Reynolds saw the need for a rail connection between the end of the regular railroad line at Malvern and the resort town itself, which would eliminate the need for a slow and uncomfortable stagecoach ride.

Construction of his narrow-gauge railroad began in April 1875. Trains began operating on the 21-mile line a year later.

On October 16, 1889, the line was converted from three-foot gauge width to a standard-gauge railway in about three hours, after several months of preparation. The Malvern brick roundhouse and turntable were modified for standard-gauge operation, and remained the principal locomotive shop for the railroad.

Operations on the Hot Springs Railroad ended with the last passenger train in 1964. Today, Hot Springs Railroad's tracks are owned and operated by Arkansas Midland Railroad (reporting mark AKMD), a Class III short-line railroad headquartered in Malvern.

AKMD operates 138 miles (222 km) of line in Arkansas consisting of seven disconnected branch lines. One such AKMD line runs on 33.3 mi (53.6 km) of track from Malvern through Jones Mills to Hot Springs, and then on to Mountain Pine. The Malvern-to-Hot Springs portion of this line was the Hot Springs Railroad trackage, which was later part of the Union Pacific Railroad. All AKMD branch lines connect (interchange traffic) with Union Pacific. AKMD also interchanges with the BNSF in North Little Rock.
