= State Line Slough (Iowa) =

Slough in Iowa, U.S.

Coordinates: 42.8764°N 91.0864°W

The State Line Slough is a marshy area of the Mississippi River as it flows past Clayton County, Iowa. The state boundary between Iowa and Wisconsin runs down the center of the Mississippi River.

Pikes Peak State Park is nearby. There are popular fish species at this Lake including yellow perch and northern pike.

== See also ==
- State Line Slough (Missouri)
- List of rivers of Iowa
