= Waterloo Creek (Upper Iowa River tributary) =

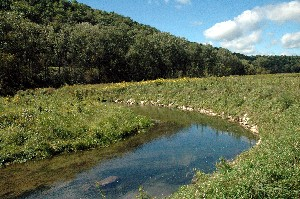
- Waterloo Creek (Photo by Jason Johnson, NRCS)

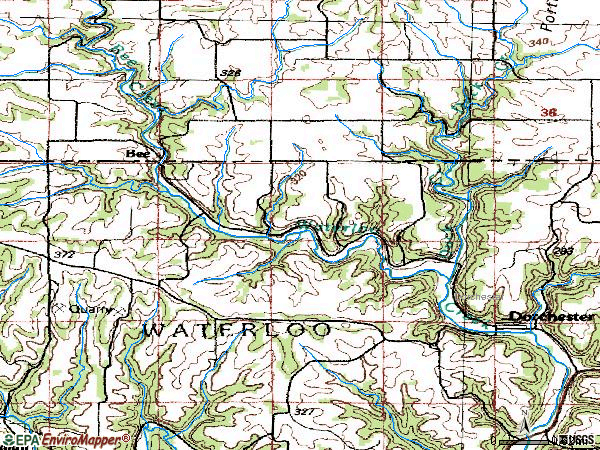
- Waterloo Creek (EPA)

Location
- Country: US
- State: Iowa
- District: Allamakee County, Iowa

Physical characteristics
- Source
  - coordinates: 43.5005°N 91.5697°W
- Mouth: Upper Iowa River
  - coordinates: 43.4303°N 91.5204°W
  - elevation: 673 ft (205 m)

Waterloo Creek is a 9.7-mile-long (15.6 km) tributary of the Upper Iowa River, with a watershed covering 48.3 square miles (125 km^{2}). It rises as Bee Creek in Houston County, Minnesota, southwest of the city of Spring Grove, flowing generally in a southeasterly direction, crossing into Waterloo Township in Allamakee County, Iowa, where it becomes Waterloo Creek and takes a generally north–south route to its confluence with Bear Creek, just before entering the Upper Iowa River. Iowa Highway 76 parallels the stream until crossing the river. The town of Dorchester, Iowa is the only settlement alongside it.

The creek is rated as one of the best trout fishing streams in Iowa. In recent years, substantial restoration work on the creek has been accomplished, removing invasive non-native planting and restoring the original meanderings of spring-fed brooks.

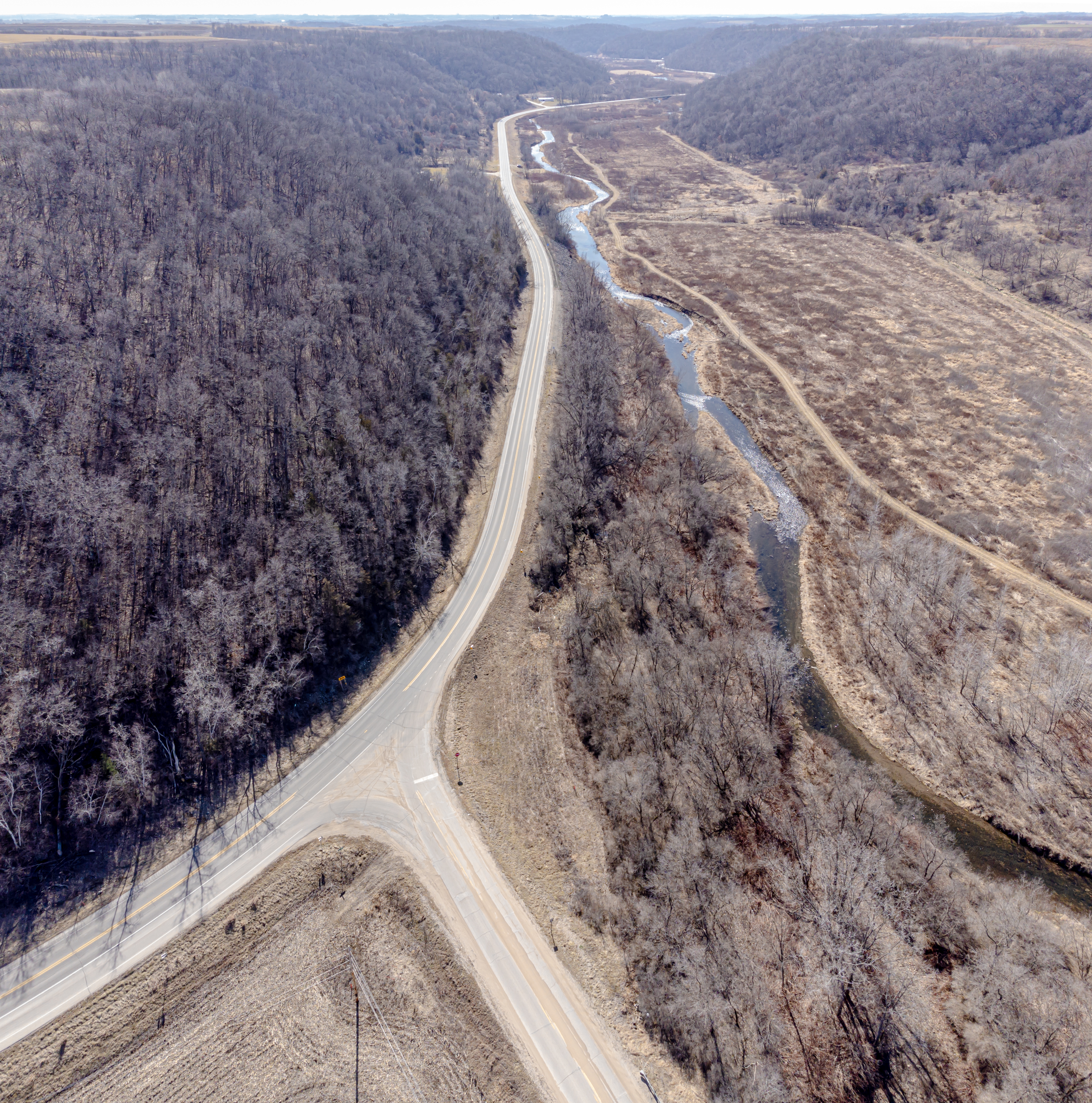
Waterloo Creek running along IA-76 near Dorchester, Iowa

== See also ==
- List of rivers of Iowa
