= Joseph "Diamond Jo" Reynolds Office Building and House =

Historic house in Iowa, United States

- U.S. National Register of Historic Places
- U.S. Historic district – Contributing property
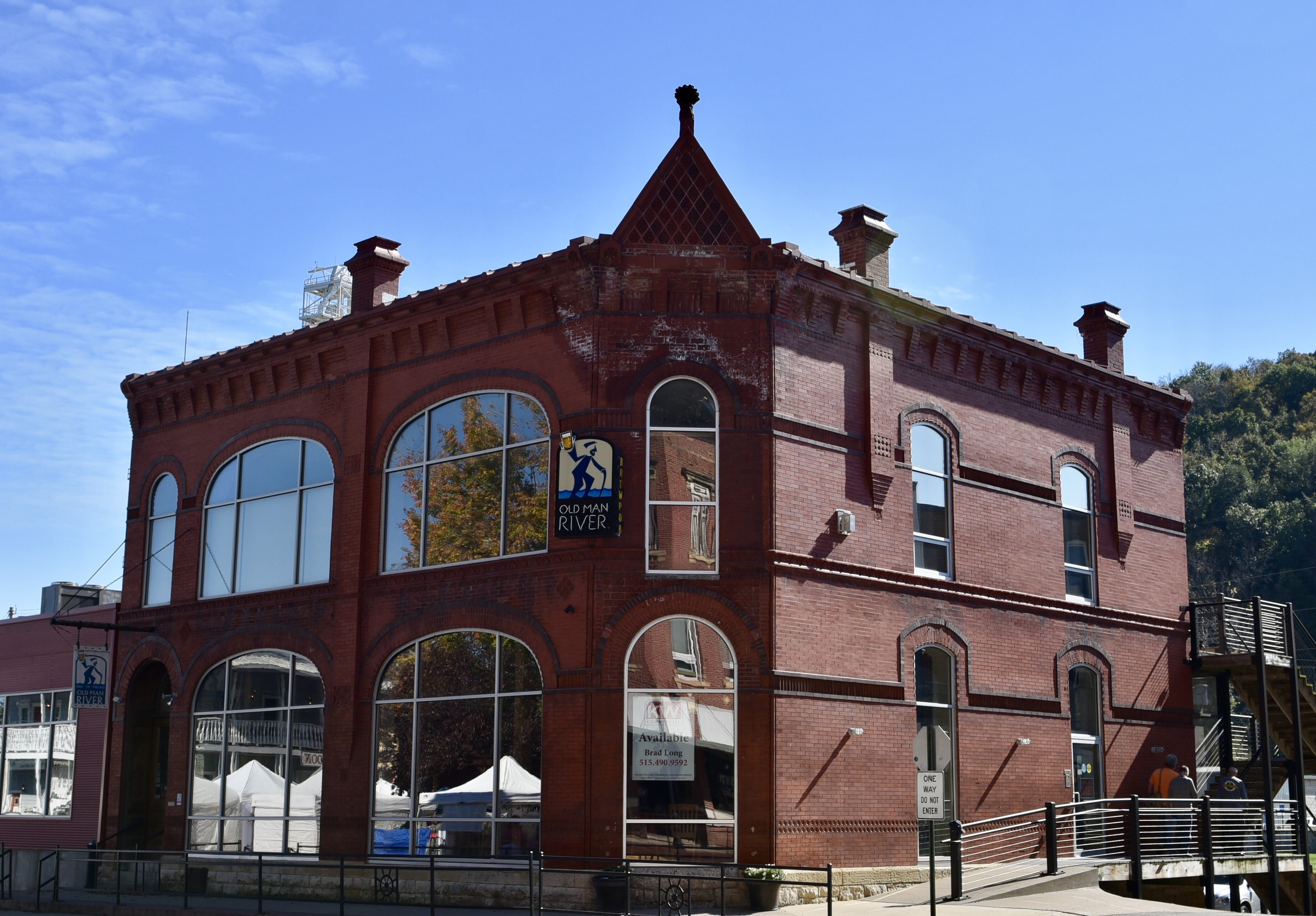

- Location within Iowa Location within the United States
- Location: A and Main Sts. McGregor, Iowa
- Coordinates: 43°01′28.5″N 91°10′30″W
- Area: less than one acre
- Built: 1885
- Architectural style: Romanesque Revival
- Part of: McGregor Commercial Historic District (ID02001033)
- NRHP reference No.: 82002614
- Added to NRHP: February 19, 1982

The Joseph "Diamond Jo" Reynolds Office Building and House is a historic building located in McGregor, Iowa, United States. Joseph "Diamond Joe" Reynolds was a New York native who started working in a gristmill in the 1840s. As the grain belt moved to the west, he moved with it, settling in Chicago in the 1850s and McGregor around 1860. Because of difficulties accessing steamboats to ship grain down the Mississippi River, he established the Diamond Jo line in 1866. It grew to become a major player in the transportation industry. He had its headquarters moved from Fulton, Illinois to Dubuque, Iowa in 1874. By the late 1870s railroads had taken over as the primary means of shipping grain, and Reynolds turned his attention to passenger boats. He had this combination office and residential building constructed in 1885. Reynolds died in 1891 and his widow sold the building before her death in 1895. It has subsequently housed grain trader offices, a billiard parlor, the post office, a winery, shops, and apartments.

The building is a two-story brick Romanesque Revival structure. It features round arch windows and doorways, a terra cotta and a triangular pediment above the main entrance. A second-story projecting bay window above the entrance was added about 1900, after the Reynolds' ownership. It has subsequently been removed. The building was listed on the National Register of Historic Places in 1982. In 2002 it was listed as a contributing property in the McGregor Commercial Historic District.

== See also ==
- Diamond Jo Boat Store and Office in Dubuque, Iowa.
