= Phelps City, Missouri =

Unincorporated community in Missouri, U.S.

- Unincorporated community
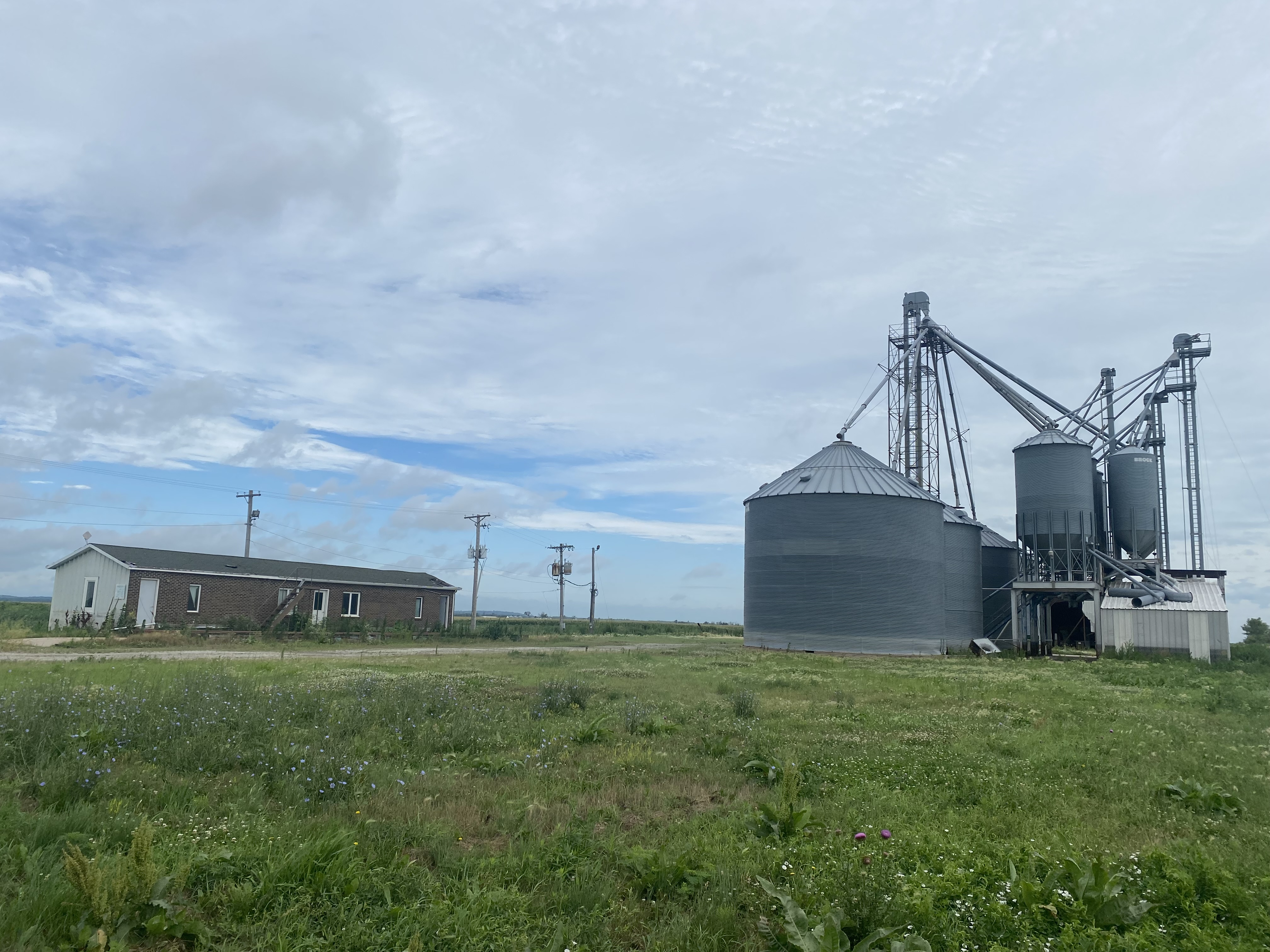
- View of Phelps City, Missouri, north of U.S. Highway 136

- Location within Missouri
- Coordinates: 40°24′02″N 95°35′42″W
- Country: United States
- State: Missouri
- County: Atchison
- Township: Templeton

Area
  - Total: 0.49 sq mi (1.28 km^{2})
  - Land: 0.49 sq mi (1.28 km^{2})
  - Water: 0 sq mi (0.00 km^{2})
- Elevation: 889 ft (271 m)

Population (2020)
  - Total: 0
  - Density: 0/sq mi (0/km^{2})
- Time zone: UTC-6 (Central (CST))
  - Summer (DST): UTC-5 (CDT)
- Area code: 660
- GNIS feature ID: 2587101

Phelps City is an unincorporated community in Atchison County, Missouri, United States. As of the 2020 census, its population was 0, down from 24 in 2010. The community is 5 miles (8.0 km) west of Rock Port. It is the closest Missouri community to Brownville Bridge, a Missouri River crossing that is listed on the National Register of Historic Places.

== History ==
Phelps City was platted in 1868. The community was named for Willis Phelps, one of the owners of the town site. A post office was established at Phelps City in 1868, and remained in operation until 1954. The settlement is located along the main line of the Chicago, Burlington, and Quincy Railroad, and there was a train station called Phelps Station. In 1904, there were a couple dozen homes and two churches in the town. The Missouri River floods of the 2010s, especially the 2019 flood, heavily affected this community and largely led to its diminution. The BNSF Railway still runs trains daily through Phelps on the Napier Subdivision.

== Demographics ==
Historical population
Census	Pop.	Note	%±
1900	167		—
1910	97		−41.9%
1920	100		3.1%
1930	94		−6.0%
1940	195		107.4%
1950	139		−28.7%
1960	81		−41.7%
1970	76		−6.2%
1980	39		−48.7%
1990	32		−17.9%
2010	24		—
2020	0		−100.0%
U.S. Decennial Census

Phelps City is no longer considered a census-designated place by the State of Missouri.

== Education ==
The school district is Rock Port R-II School District. Rock Port High School is the zoned comprehensive high school.
