= McGregor Commercial Historic District =

Historic district in Iowa, United States

- U.S. National Register of Historic Places
- U.S. Historic district
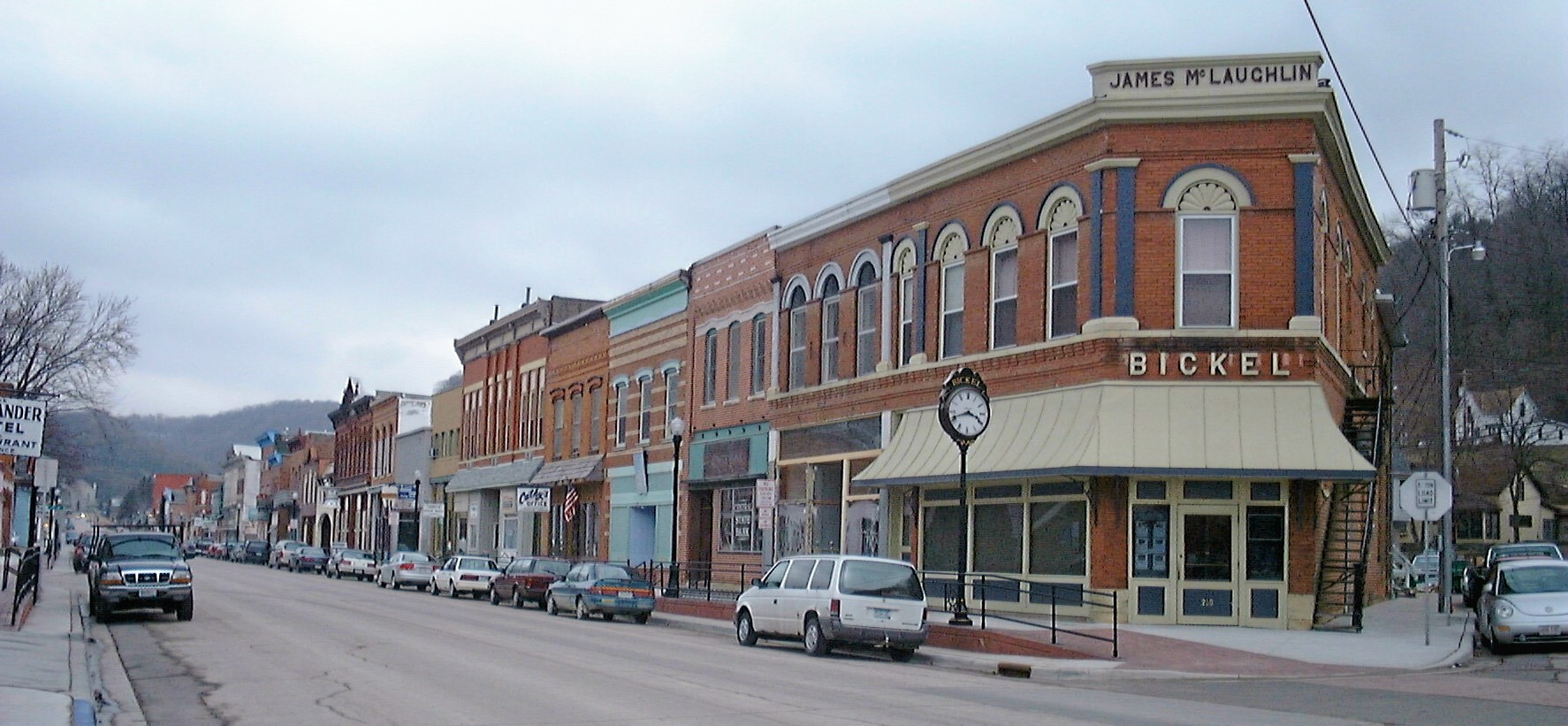

- Location within Iowa Location within the United States
- Location: 100-300 blocks of Main St. and the 100 and 200 blocks of A St., McGregor, Iowa
- Coordinates: 43°01′26″N 91°10′33″W
- Area: 15 acres (6.1 ha)
- Architect: E.C.W. Jacobs
- Architectural style: Italianate; Greek Revival
- MPS: Iowa's Main Street Commercial Architecture MPS
- NRHP reference No.: 02001033
- Added to NRHP: December 10, 2002

The McGregor Commercial Historic District is a nationally recognized historic district located in McGregor, Iowa, United States. It was listed on the National Register of Historic Places in 2002. At the time of its nomination the district consisted of 60 resources, including 51 contributing buildings, one contributing site, one contributing structure, and seven noncontributing buildings. Unlike most river towns in Iowa the central business district does not follow along the Mississippi River, but moves away from it. It is linear in shape, following Main Street, which runs from the southwest to the northeast in a narrow valley between two 400-foot (120 m) bluffs. The narrow valley ends at the river.

The buildings in the district were constructed between 1849 and 1952, with a significant number built between 1849 and 1860. They are between one and three stories in height, are generally constructed of brick, and follow the commercial Italianate and Greek Revival styles. There are also a few stone, frame and log structures. Local architect E.C.W. Jacobs designed a couple of buildings in the district, notably: First National Bank (1863), Town Hall and Jail (1874), and 128-134 Main Street (1880s). Three buildings are individually listed on the National Register: the American House (1854), the Joseph "Diamond Jo" Reynolds Office Building and House (1885), and the Goedert Meat Market (1890). Market Square, a park, is the contributing site, and the main line storm sewer is the contributing structure.
