= Hot Springs Railroad Roundhouse =

- U.S. National Register of Historic Places
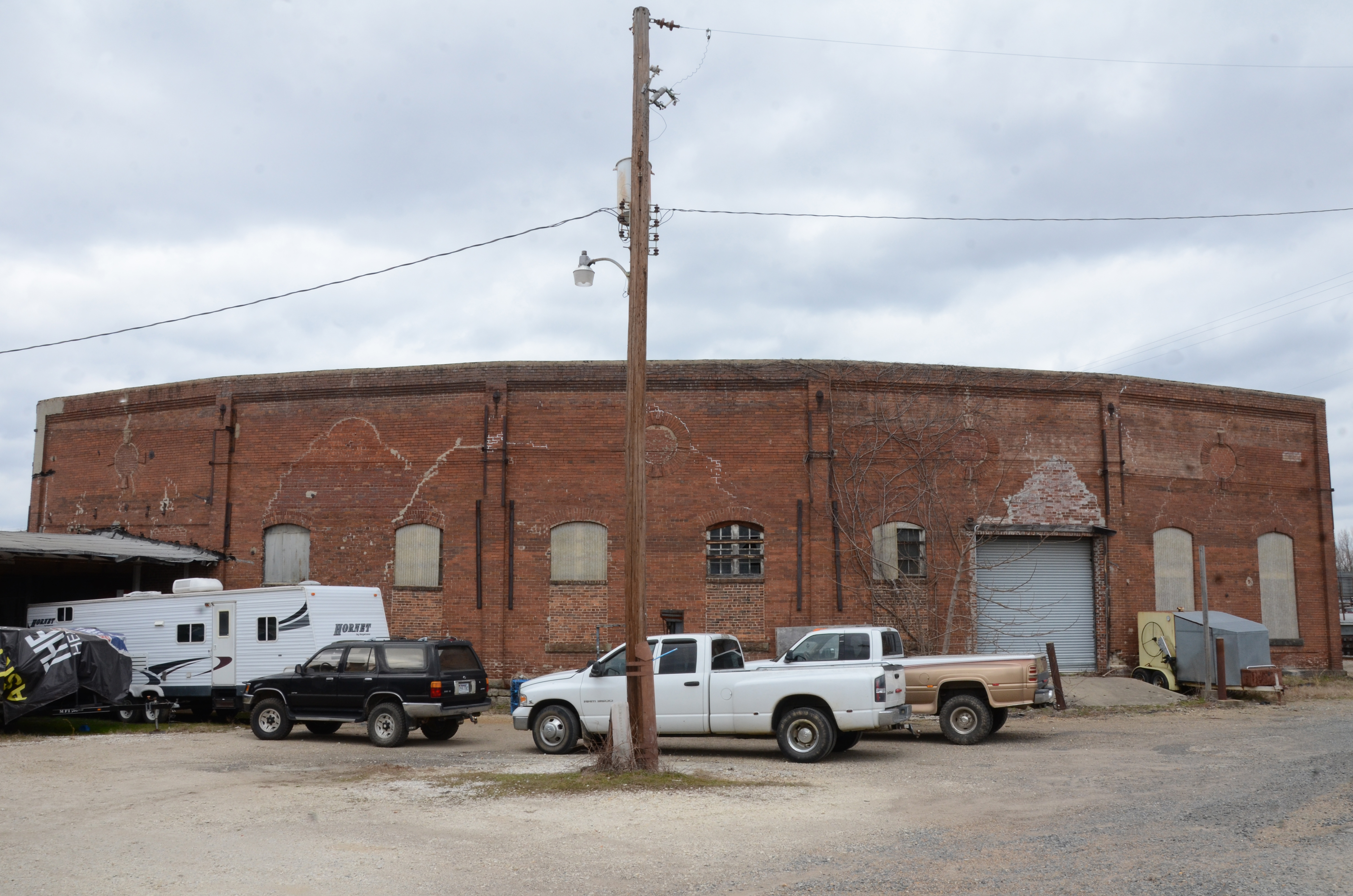

- Location within Arkansas Location within the United States
- Location: 132 Front St., Malvern, Arkansas
- Coordinates: 34°21′53″N 92°48′59″W
- Area: less than one acre
- Built: 1887
- Built by: Hot Springs Railroad
- Architectural style: Early Commercial
- NRHP reference No.: 03000462
- Added to NRHP: May 29, 2003

The Hot Springs Railroad Roundhouse is located at 132 Front Street in Malvern, Arkansas. Built in 1887, it is the last known surviving substantially intact roundhouse in the state. It has brick walls and a granite foundation, and houses five stalls. It was built by the Hot Springs Railroad as a service facility for its locomotives, and was used in that capacity until 1904. It has been repurposed for use as a warehouse and manufacturing facility.

The building was listed on the National Register of Historic Places in 2003.

== See also ==
- National Register of Historic Places listings in Hot Spring County, Arkansas
