= Waterloo Gasoline Engine Company =

Former farm tractor company

1917 Waterloo Boy logo.

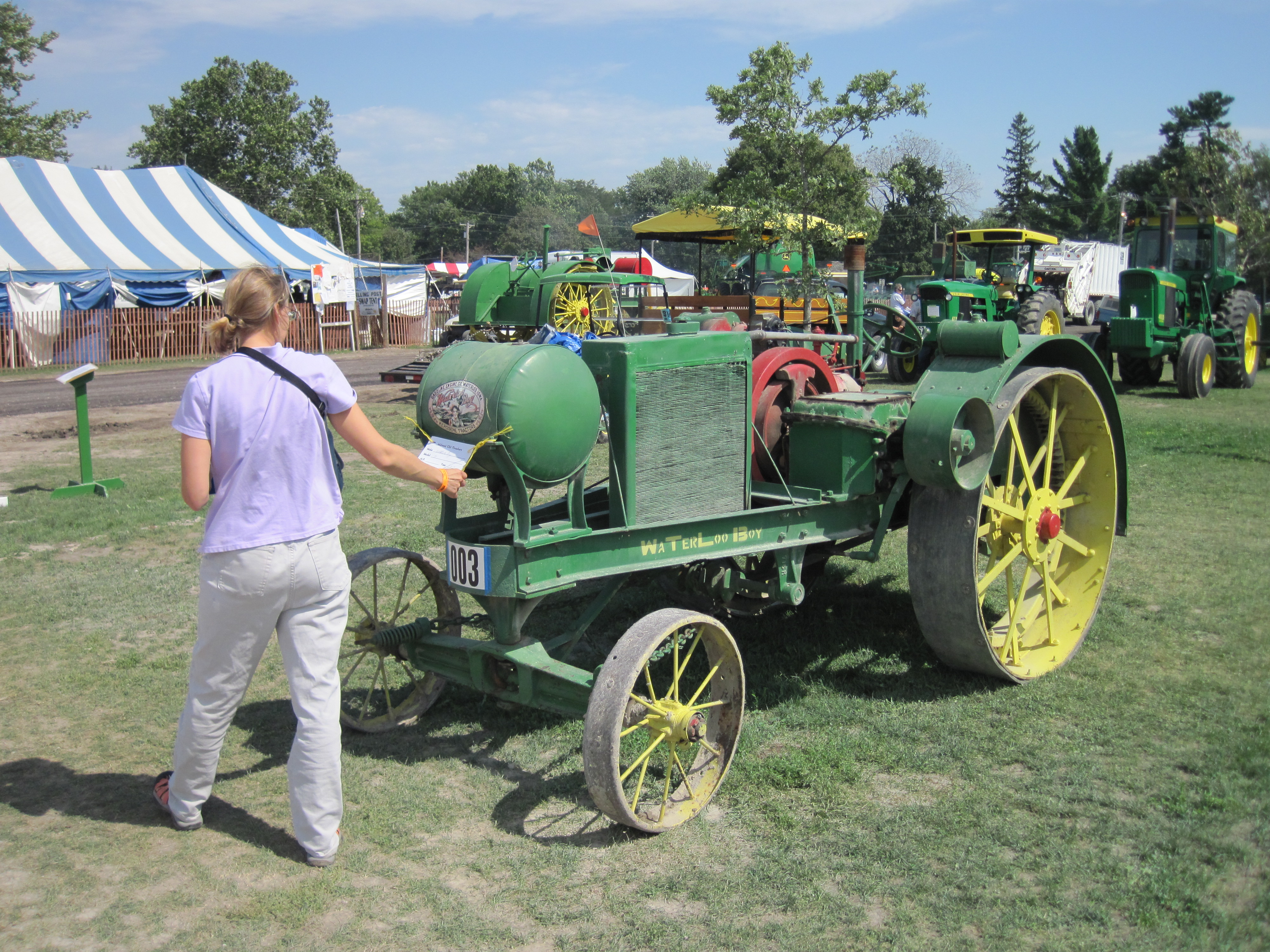
1917 "Waterloo Boy" kerosene-fueled tractor.

The Waterloo Gasoline Engine Company was the first company to manufacture and sell gasoline powered farm tractors. Based in Waterloo, Iowa, the company was created by John Froelich and a group of Iowa businessmen in 1893, and was originally named the Waterloo Gasoline Traction Engine Company. In 1892, Froelich built a functional gasoline-powered tractor, and the new company was given the opportunity to manufacture and sell the tractor Froelich designed. The tractor was not successful commercially, and of the four tractors built by the company only two were purchased, and these were later returned to the company by unsatisfied customers. In 1895, the company was sold to John W. Miller and renamed the Waterloo Gasoline Engine Company. Miller decided to stop producing tractors and instead focus on building plain gasoline engines.

== Background ==
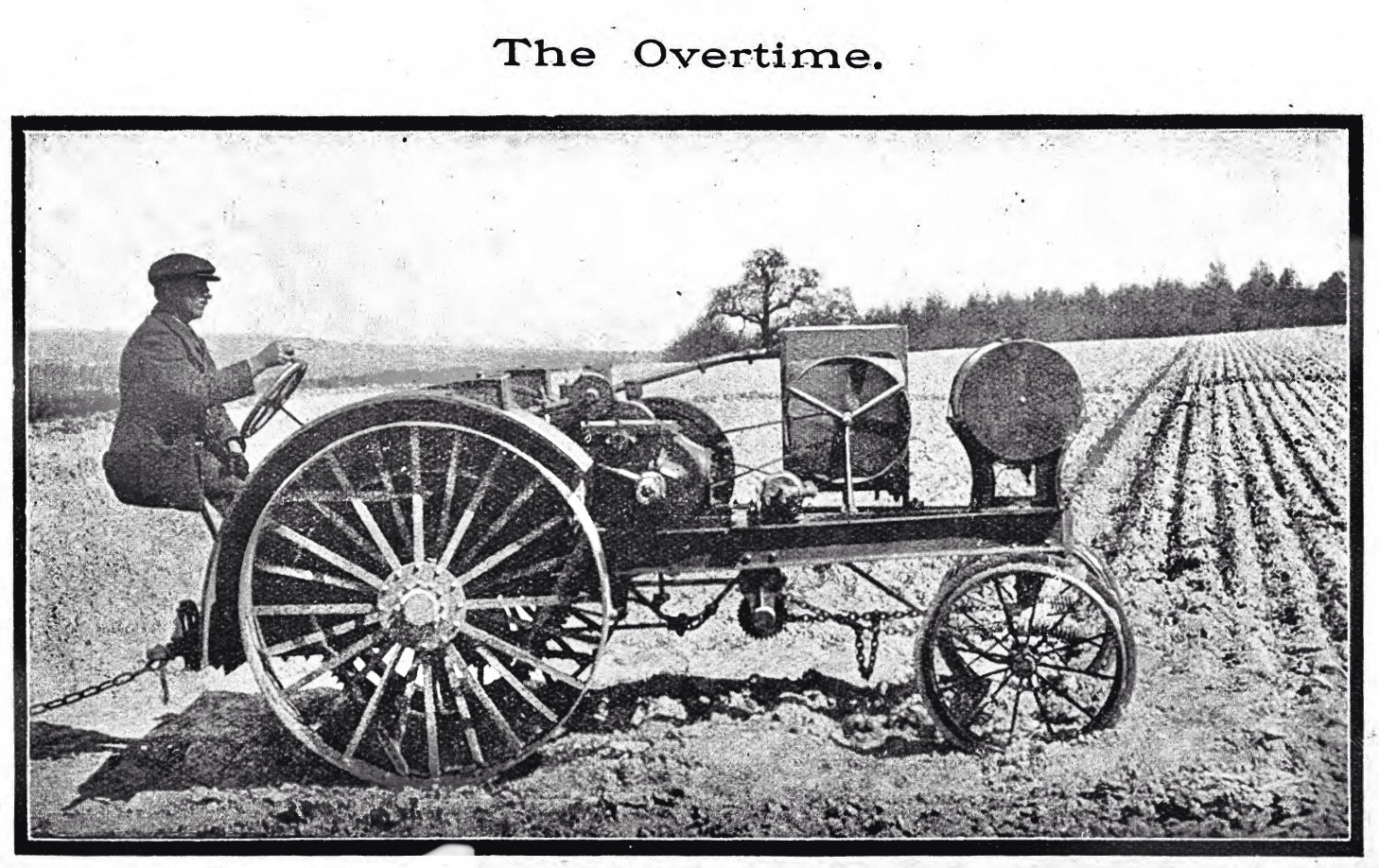
Overtime "Waterloo Boy" Model R (1916-1918)

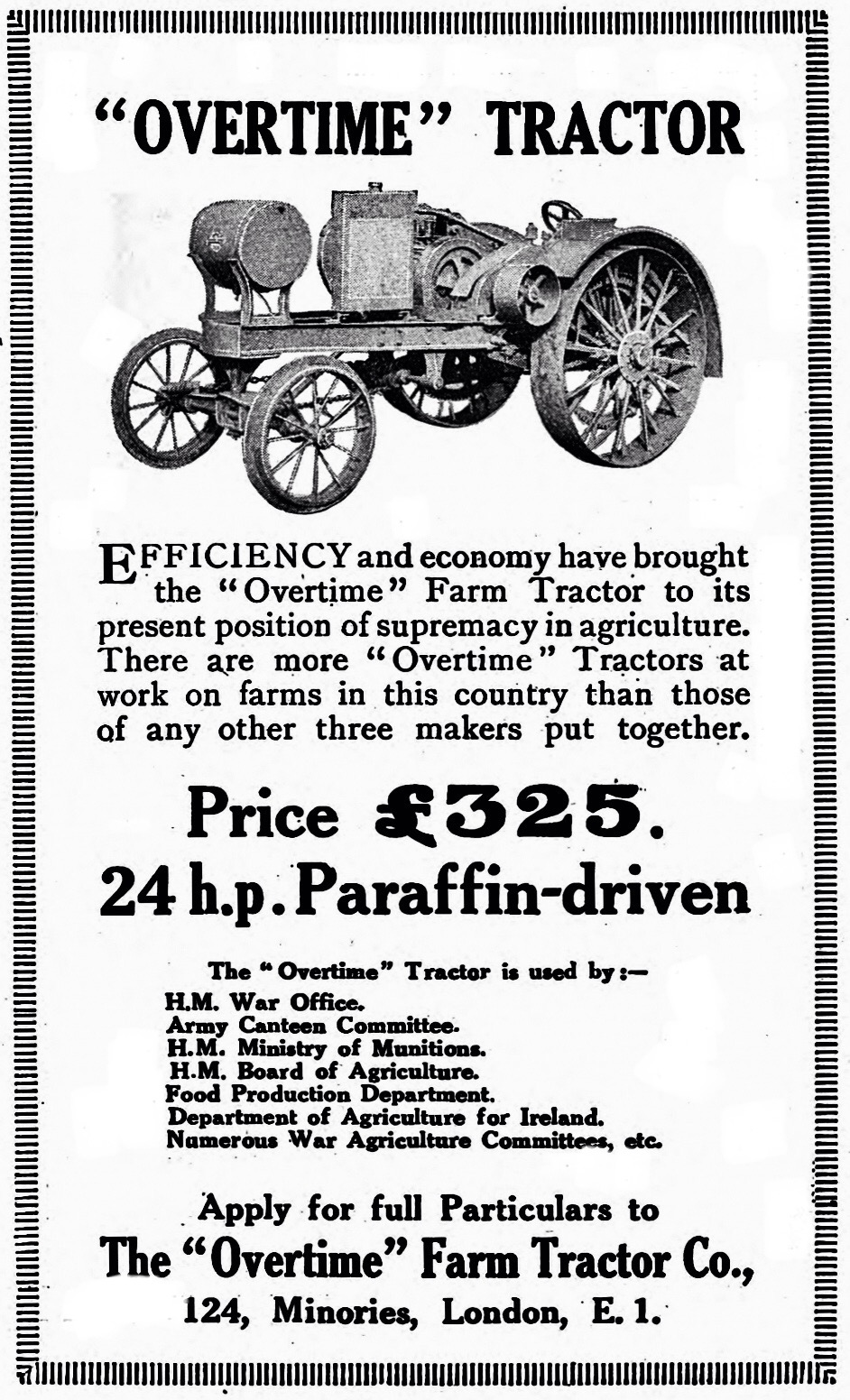
Overtime 24 hp

Following several years of research and development, the company once again began to manufacture tractors in 1911, but none would sell well until 1913, when twenty “Waterloo Boy” tractors were produced. In 1914 the company introduced the Model R Waterloo Boy. This tractor proved immensely popular, and over eight thousand were sold before the line was discontinued in 1923. The company also had great success with the Model N, which was introduced in late 1916. Despite the company's name, both the Model R and Model N burned kerosene for fuel. From 1915 the tractor was imported into the UK by Overtime Farm Tractor Co in a partially disassembled form. They then assembled the tractors with a different color and sold them under the Overtime name.

By this time, several other companies had begun to build and sell tractors, but the Waterloo Boy was easily one of the most popular. In 1918, Deere & Company, a farm equipment company based in Moline, Illinois purchased the Waterloo Gasoline Engine Company for $2,100,000. Deere & Company had been anxious to enter the growing tractor market, but its own initial designs had proved unsuccessful. Executives at Deere & Company decided to purchase the Waterloo Gasoline Engine Co. because field tests indicated that the Waterloo Boy tractor had the best performance. After the sale was completed, the company became known as the John Deere Tractor Company, but tractors produced by the company continued to be sold under the Waterloo Boy name until 1923, when the John Deere Model D was introduced.

== See also ==
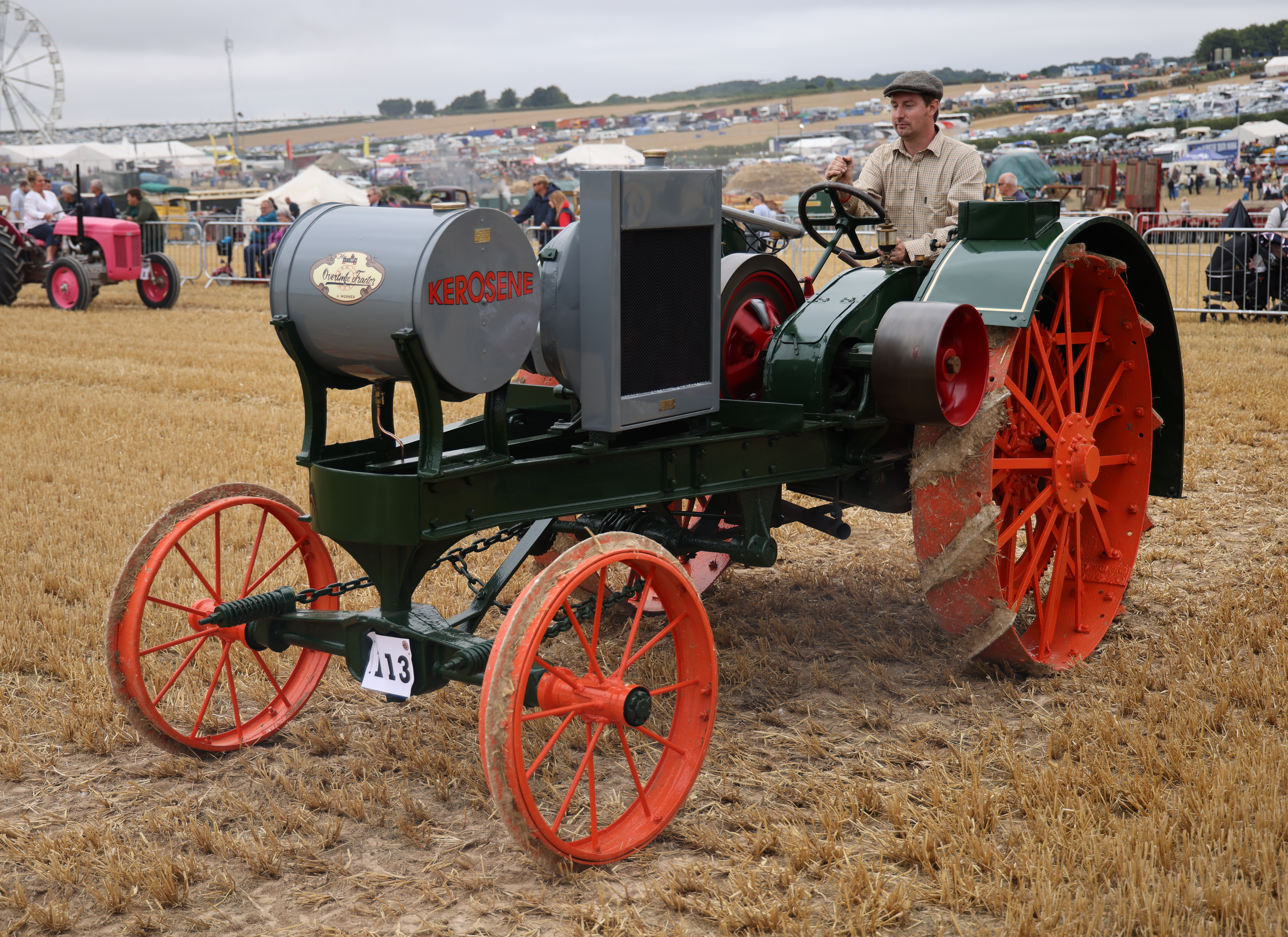
1915 Overtime tractor

- List of tractor manufacturers
