= Marian E. Hubbard =

American zoologist (1868–1956)

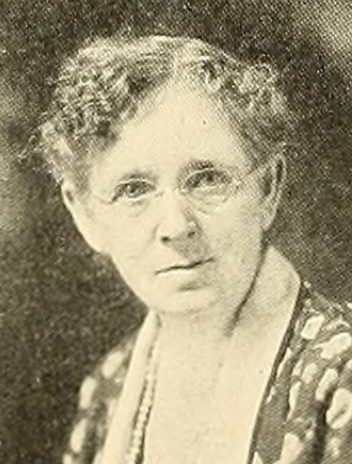
- Born: August 31, 1868; McGregor, Iowa
- Died: February 24, 1956 (aged 87)
- Education: Mount Holyoke College; University of Chicago (BS)
- Scientific career
- Fields: Zoology

Marian Elizabeth Hubbard (August 31, 1868 – February 24, 1956) was an American zoologist and associate professor of zoology at Wellesley College, where she taught for over 40 years.

== Early life ==
Marian Elizabeth Hubbard was born in McGregor, Iowa, to parents Rodolphus and Hanna Hubbard, In 1886 she graduated from McGregor school. She attended Mount Holyoke Female Seminary (now Mount Holyoke College) until 1889 and graduated from the University of Chicago with a B.S. in 1894.

== Professional career ==
Despite only earning a bachelor's degree, she taught at Wellesley College in Massachusetts for over 40 years, rising to the rank of professor, and retiring as professor emerita in 1937. Hubbard was known as "the flight of the zoology department" due to her feminist approach at Wellesley, and often wrote in the Wellesley Alumnae Quarterly on scientific matters across campus. She was once a member of the American Ornithologists' Union, the American Association of University Professors, and the American Association for the Advancement of Science. Hubbard was also a prominent advocate for women's suffrage and advocated among the Wellesley College campus writing articles to the school's president about women scientists and their struggles.

Hubbard's research included heredity in insects, embryology of birds, and behavior of salamanders. In 1904, Hubbard researched and co-authored an article on pecten and varying pecten ray length. After her research on pecten, Hubbard encountered an issue when a fire in 1914 at Wellesley College, where her 20 years of research on beetles was destroyed. In 1908, Hubbard published an article in The American Naturalist titled "Some Experiments on the Order of Succession of the Somites in the Chick" that was Mostly inspired by an 1889 article by Julia Platt on the formation of somites during development. To verify past claims, Hubbard surgically damaged somites (using “Miss Peebles’ method”) to determine whether that stopped formation of new somites. The results challenged Platt’s interpretation.

She retired from Wellesley College in 1937 and died February 24, 1956.

== Works ==
- Hubbard, Marian E. (1903-12-05). "Correlated Protective Devices In Some California Salamanders". University of California Publications in Zoology. 1:157–168.
- Davenport, C. B.; Hubbard, Marian E. (1904-12). "Studies in the evolution of Pecten IV. Ray variability in Pecten varius". Journal of Experimental Zoology. 1 (4): 607–616. doi:10.1002/jez.1400010407. ISSN 0022-104X.
- Hubbard, Marian E. (1908-07-01). "Some Experiments on the Order of Succession of the Somites of the Chick". The American Naturalist. 42 (499): 466–472. doi:10.1086/278956.
