= Leo Stanton Rowe =

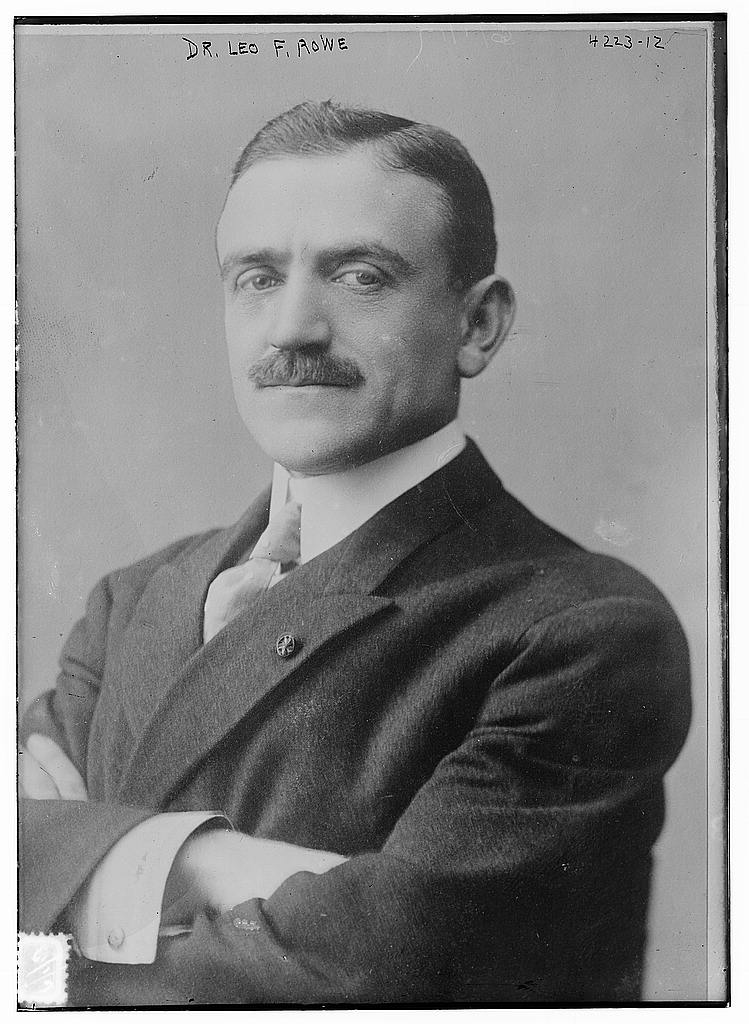
- Rowe in 1917

United States Assistant Secretary of the Treasury
- In office 1917–1919

Director General of the Pan-American Union
- In office 1920–1946

Personal details
- Born: September 17, 1871 McGregor, Iowa
- Died: December 5, 1946 (aged 75) Washington, DC

Leo Stanton Rowe (September 17, 1871 – December 5, 1946) was the director general of the Pan-American Union from 1920 to 1946.

== Life ==
He was born on September 17, 1871, in McGregor, Iowa, to Louis Rowe and Catherine Raff. His family moved to Philadelphia and he attended high school and graduated in 1887. He attended the University of Pennsylvania and graduated with a Bachelor of Philosophy degree in 1890. He received his Ph.D. from the University of Halle in 1893. He received his J.D. from the University of Pennsylvania Law School in 1895.

He was appointed professor at the University of Pennsylvania in 1894. He taught there until 1917.

Rowe was elected to the American Philosophical Society in 1911 and the American Academy of Arts and Sciences in 1932.

In 1900, Rowe was appointed by President McKinley to a commission that revised the laws of Puerto Rico.

He has been described as "progressive imperialist who believed in the superiority of U.S. institutions of government." In writings over the period 1900–1904, Rowe wrote that US military occupations always gave way to civil governments in the end, thus making US occupations different from those of other empires. By 1914, he had changed his views, arguing that the institutional stability and economic progress in some parts of Latin America called for a shift toward a policy of cultural and intellectual cooperation. He staunchly opposed President Woodrow Wilson’s policy of intervention in Mexico, seeing the defense of U.S. Americans in Mexico as a poor reason for intervention.

In 1913, he was on the land claims commission in Panama.

He was United States Assistant Secretary of the Treasury from 1917 to 1919. He was among the first Latin American experts hired by the State Department, 1919–1920. He was the director general of the Pan-American Union from 1920 to 1946. He shaped U.S. foreign policy towards Latin America, influencing its shift from Dollar Diplomacy to the Good Neighbor Policy.

He died on December 5, 1946, in Washington, D.C. when he was struck by a car when crossing a road.

A now-digitized transcript at the University of Pennsylvania shows that the suffragist, feminist, and women's rights activist, Alice Paul, was one of his students, in the class he offered on Municipal Government and Institutions in the United States and Latin America.

== Works ==
- The United States and Porto Rico: With Special Reference to the Problems Arising Out of Our Contact with the Spanish-American Civilization. Longmans, Green, and Company. 1904.
- Rowe, L. S. (1908). The Problems of City Government.
- Rowe, L. S. (1912). "The Mexican Revolution: Its Causes and Consequences". Political Science Quarterly. 27 (2): 281–297. doi:10.2307/2141244. ISSN 0032-3195.
- Rowe, L. S. (1921). The Federal System of the Argentine Republic.
