= John Froelich =

American inventor (1849-1933)

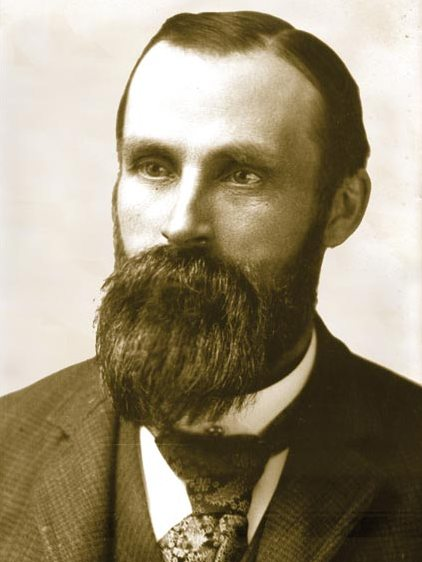
- Born: November 24, 1849; Froelich, Iowa, U.S.
- Died: May 24, 1933 (aged 83); Saint Paul, Minnesota, U.S.
- Occupation: Inventor
- Known for: Inventing the first gasoline-powered tractor with forward and reverse gears

John Froelich (November 24, 1849 – May 24, 1933) was an Iowan inventor and entrepreneur, who invented the first stable gasoline-powered tractor with forward and reverse gears. He received several patents relating to tractors and internal combustion engines.

== Life and career ==
Froelich was born in 1849 in Giard, Iowa to Henry and Kathryn (née Gutheil) Froelich. Henry, whose original name was Johannes Heinrich Froelich, from Kurhessen, today part of the German state of Hesse. John Froelich grew up in the small town of Froelich, Iowa, named for his father Henry Froelich. As a young man he oversaw the operation of a grain elevator.

Froelich operated a threshing business, and travelled Iowa and South Dakota laboring the Great Plains using steam-powered threshers. Failing to obtain coal for his steam-powered engine, in 1892 he and his blacksmith, Will Mann, invented one of the first gasoline-powered tractors by mounting a one-cylinder Van Duzen gasoline engine on a Robinson engine frame, propelled by Froelich's own gearing. This was the first mechanically successful gasoline-powered tractor with backward and forward propulsion. After completing the tractor, Froelich and Mann brought it to Langford, South Dakota, where they would connect it to a J.I. Case threshing machine, and thresh 72,000 bushels in 52 days.

In 1893, Froelich and a group of investors founded the Waterloo Gasoline Traction Engine Company, based in Waterloo, Iowa. The company only produced four tractors, and only sold two, both of which were returned as unsatisfactory. In 1895 the company abandoned tractor manufacturing and changed the name to Waterloo Gasoline Engine Company, producing stationary engines instead.

Froelich left the company the same year and relocated his wife and four kids to Dubuque, Iowa, where he worked for several engine manufacturing companies. Here, he developed a new type of clothes-washing machine he named the Froelich Neostyle Washer, which brought him considerable financial prosperity.

He later moved to Marshalltown, eventually settling in St. Paul, Minnesota in 1929.

== Death and legacy ==
Froelich died in St. Paul in 1933 in relative obscurity. The small town of Froelich commemorated the invention of the tractor in 1939, and a few decades later, opened the Froelich Tractor & 1890s Village Museum where John Froelich assembled his first gasoline tractor.

John Froelich's innovations helped pave the way for modern farming, and contributed to the establishment of Waterloo as a center for internal combustion engine production in the early years of the 20th century.
