= State Line Slough (Missouri) =

Slough in northwest Missouri, U.S.

Coordinates: 40°20′29″N 95°37′18″W

State Line Slough is a slough in western Atchison County, Missouri. The slough begins near the mouth of the Nishnabotna River and flows southerly parallel to the Missouri River to a point southwest of Langdon. The stream forms most of the eastern boundary of Evans Island. The stream is crossed by US 136 just west of Phelps City.

== See also ==
- Missouri River Valley
