= Froelich, Iowa =

- Unincorporated community
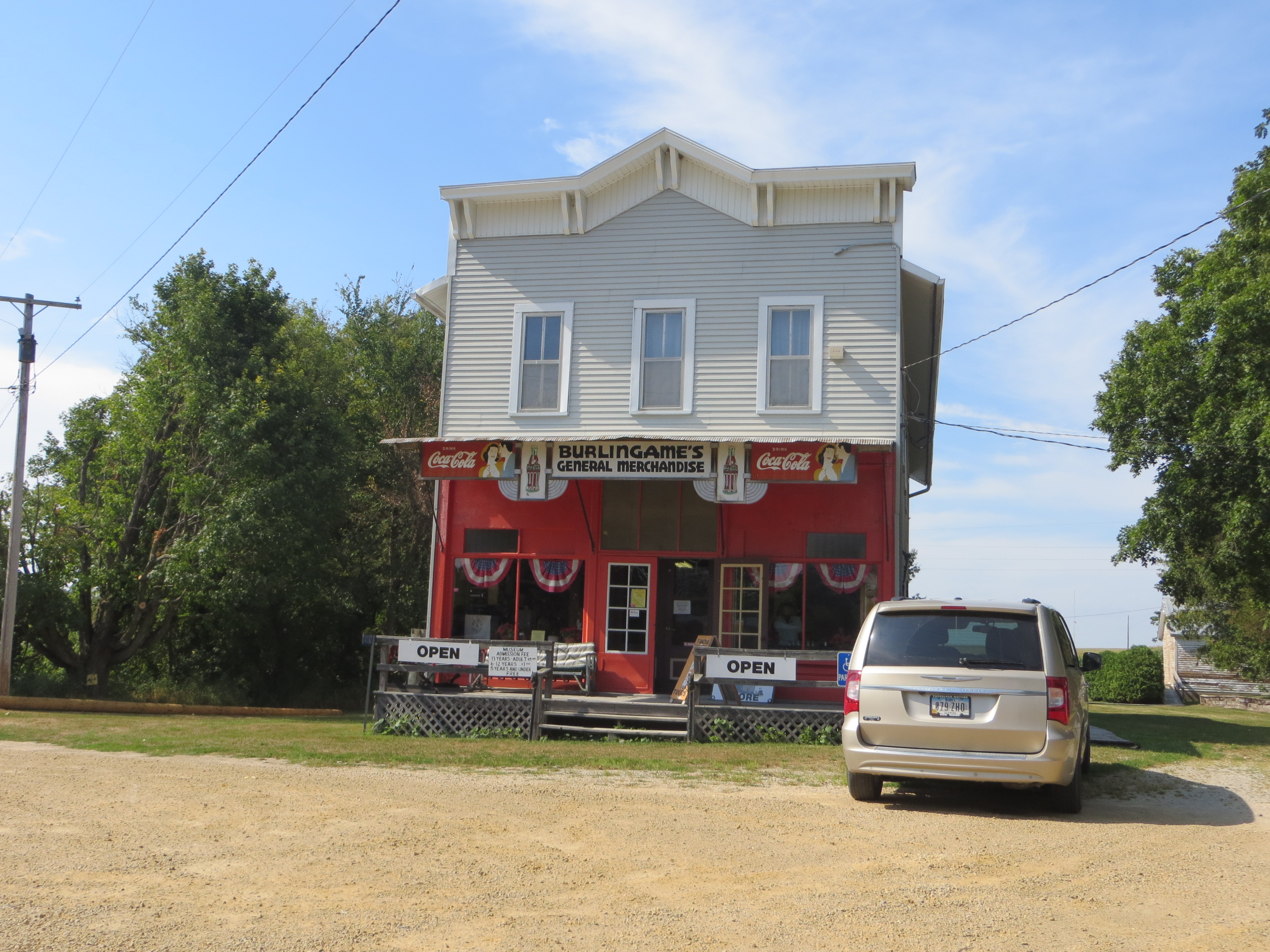
- The General Store and Post Office in Froelich was established in 1891

- Location within Iowa Location within the United States
- Coordinates: 43°00′24″N 91°19′18″W
- Country: United States
- State: Iowa
- County: Clayton
- Elevation: 1,017 ft (310 m)
- Time zone: UTC-6 (Central (CST))
  - Summer (DST): UTC-5 (CDT)
- GNIS feature ID: 456791

Froelich (/ˈfreɪlɪk/ FREY-lik) is an unincorporated community in Clayton County, Iowa, United States.

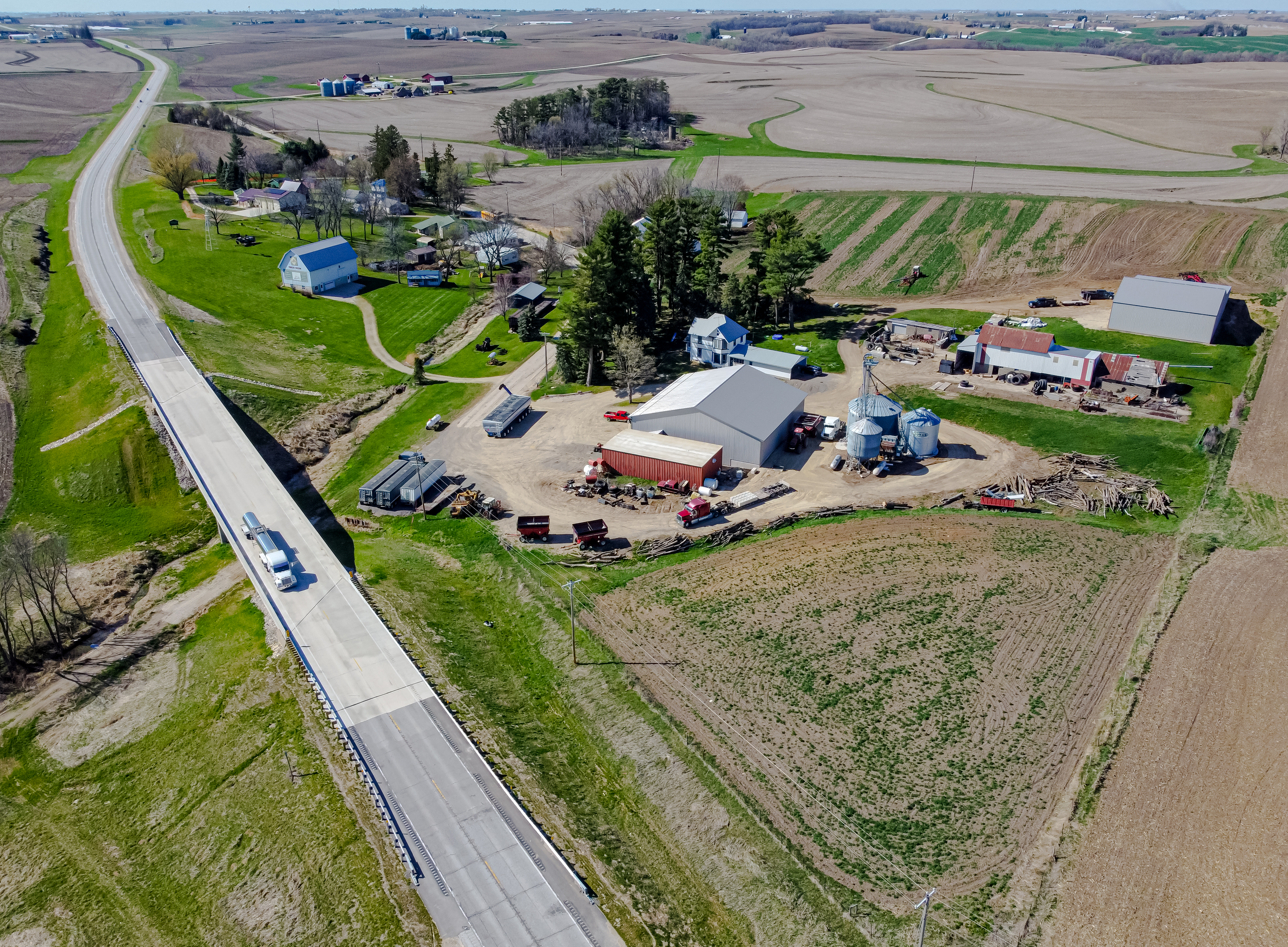
US-18 runs by town

== History ==
Froelich was once served by its own post office, which is now closed.

Froelich was named for the early landowner of the town site. The agricultural industrialist John Froelich, a son of the town's founder, grew up in Froelich. Froelich's population was 60 in 1902, and 43 in 1925. The population was 40 in 1940.
