= Dorchester, Iowa =

- Unincorporated community
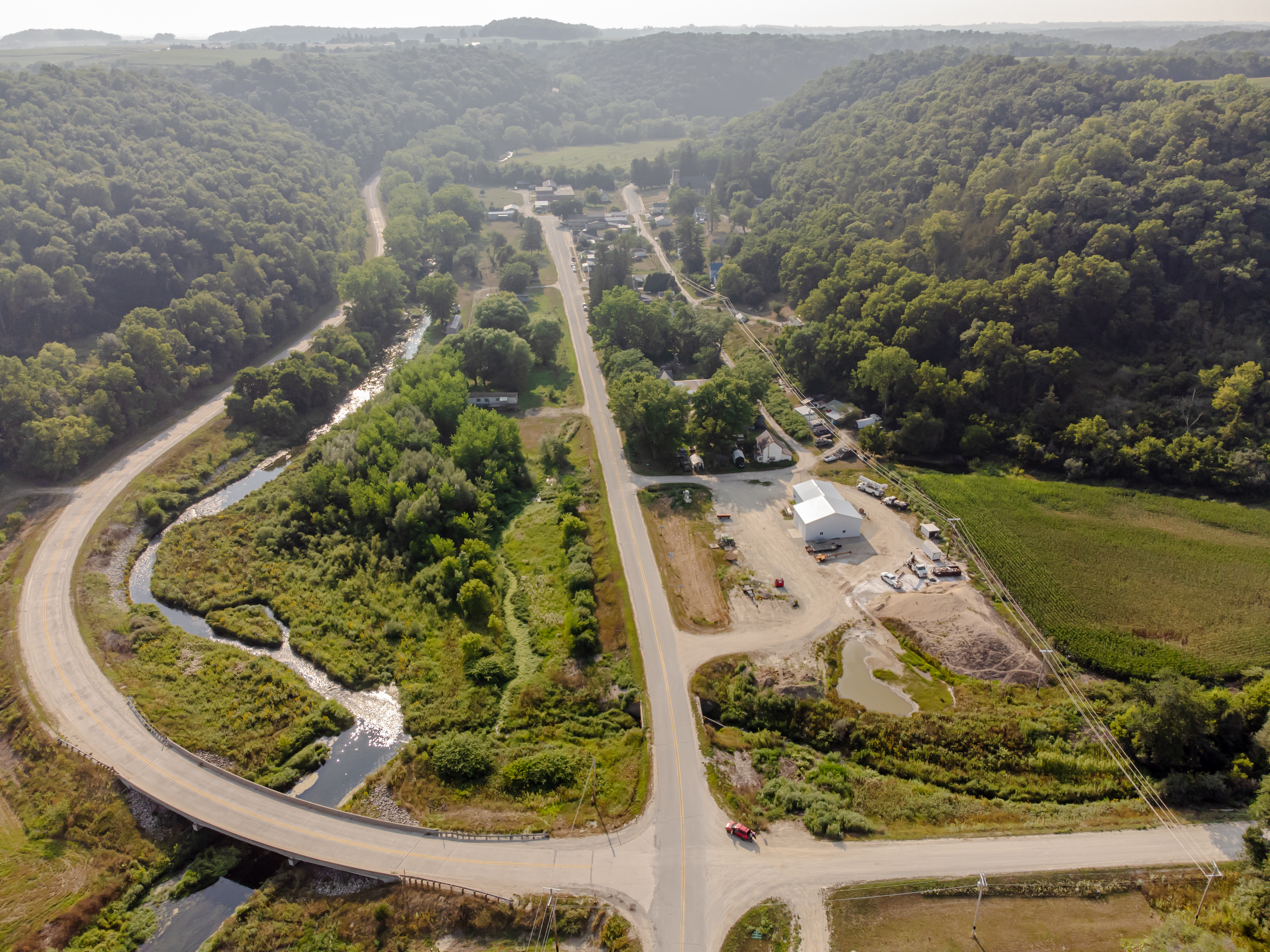
- Aerial View of Dorchester

- Location within the state of Iowa Dorchester, Iowa (the United States)
- Coordinates: 43°28′11″N 91°30′40″W
- Country: United States
- State: Iowa
- County: Allamakee

Government
- Elevation: 738 ft (225 m)
- Time zone: UTC-6 (Central (CST))
  - Summer (DST): UTC-5 (CDT)
- ZIP codes: 52140
- Area code: 563
- GNIS feature ID: 455958

Dorchester is an unincorporated community in northwestern Allamakee County, Iowa, United States. It lies along local roads just off Iowa Highway 76, north of the city of Waukon, the county seat of Allamakee County. Its elevation is 738 feet (225 m). The town was originally settled by Harvey Bell and Edmund Bell, and was named after Dorchester, England. Although Dorchester is unincorporated, it has a post office, with the ZIP code of 52140, which opened on 21 May 1857. Dorchester is located in Waterloo Township.

== History ==
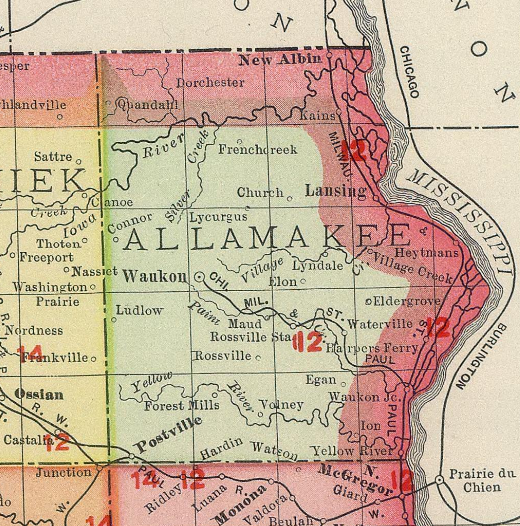
Dorchester in Allamakee County, Iowa, in 1903

Dorchester was platted in 1873. Dorchester's population was 56 in 1902, and 90 in 1925. The population was 102 in 1940.

Dorchester's location in the flood plain of the Upper Iowa River makes it vulnerable to flooding; the community was damaged by high waters in August 2007. It was worse hit on 8 June 2008 and succeeding days: over seven inches (over 18 cm) of rain fell on the eighth, and resulting record high floods of 22½ feet (20½ m) almost destroyed a trailer park that was a significant part of the tiny community. An LP gas tank from Dorchester was discovered just eight hours later in Lansing, on the opposite side of the county.

== Education ==
All students in the area are enrolled in the Allamakee Community School District in Waukon, even though Dorchester is closer to Spring Grove, Minnesota.
