= Pikes Peak State Park =

State park in Iowa, United States

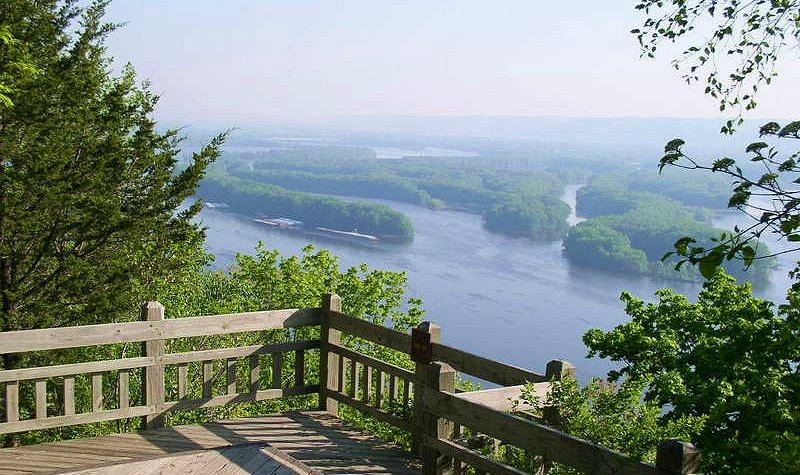
- Observation platform overlooking the Mississippi River

- Location within Iowa Location within the United States
- Location: Clayton County, Iowa, United States
- Nearest city: McGregor, Iowa
- Coordinates: 43°01′16″N 91°10′17″W
- Area: 960 acres (390 ha)
- Elevation: 630 ft (190 m)
- Established: 1935
- Administrator: Iowa Department of Natural Resources
- Named for: Zebulon Pike
- Website: Official website

Pikes Peak State Park is a state park in Clayton County, Iowa, United States, featuring a 500-foot (150 m) bluff overlooking the Upper Mississippi River opposite the confluence of the Wisconsin River. The park is operated by the Iowa Department of Natural Resources. It is nearly a thousand acres (4 km^{2}) in extent. The nearest city is McGregor, Iowa. Iowa Highway 76 approximately defines its northern boundary.

It gets its name from the Iowa incarnation of Pikes Peak, a particularly high point overlooking the gorge of the Upper Mississippi, and like Pikes Peak in Colorado, is named for Zebulon Pike. Pike visited the area in 1805 during his first expedition, camping just downstream near Clayton on September 6 and across the river near Prairie du Chien, Wisconsin the next 3 nights. Pike climbed the bluff on September 5, looking for a suitable location for a fort and marked what would become known as Pike's Peak because it was "level on the top, having a spring in the rear, and commanding a view of the country around."

There are hiking trails, campgrounds, and RV facilities. Mountain bikes are permitted in certain portions of the park. Aside from recreational development, the land in the park was never cleared and to a large extent remains as it was before the settlers.

It is part of a larger complex of parks, reserves, and refuges which include Effigy Mounds National Monument, the various components of the Yellow River State Forest, the enormous Upper Mississippi River National Wildlife and Fish Refuge and much smaller, much less well known Driftless Area National Wildlife Refuge. The Northeast Iowa Legacy Trail System is undergoing development and will connect elements of these sites.

It is nearby State Line Slough (Iowa).

== See also ==
- Pikes Peak
