= Mendon Township, Clayton County, Iowa =

Township in Iowa, US

Mendon Township
- Township
- Location in Clayton County
- Coordinates: 43°01′09″N 091°12′13″W
- Country: United States
- State: Iowa
- County: Clayton

Area
  - Total: 33.70 sq mi (87.29 km^{2})
  - Land: 32.88 sq mi (85.15 km^{2})
  - Water: 0.83 sq mi (2.14 km^{2}) 2.45%
- Elevation: 830 ft (253 m)

Population (2000)
  - Total: 1,890
  - Density: 57/sq mi (22.2/km^{2})
- GNIS feature ID: 0468374

Mendon Township is a township in Clayton County, Iowa, United States. As of the 2000 census, its population was 1,890.

== Geography ==
Mendon Township covers an area of 33.7 square miles (87 km^{2}) and contains two incorporated settlements: Marquette and McGregor. According to the USGS, it contains ten cemeteries: Baylis, Buell Park, Eastman, First Evangelical Lutheran, Knapp, Moody, Pleasant Grove, Point Ann, Saint Marys Catholic and Walton.

The streams of Bloody Run and North Cedar Creek run through this township.
