= Templeton Township, Atchison County, Missouri =

Township in Atchison County, Missouri, U.S.

Templeton Township
- Township
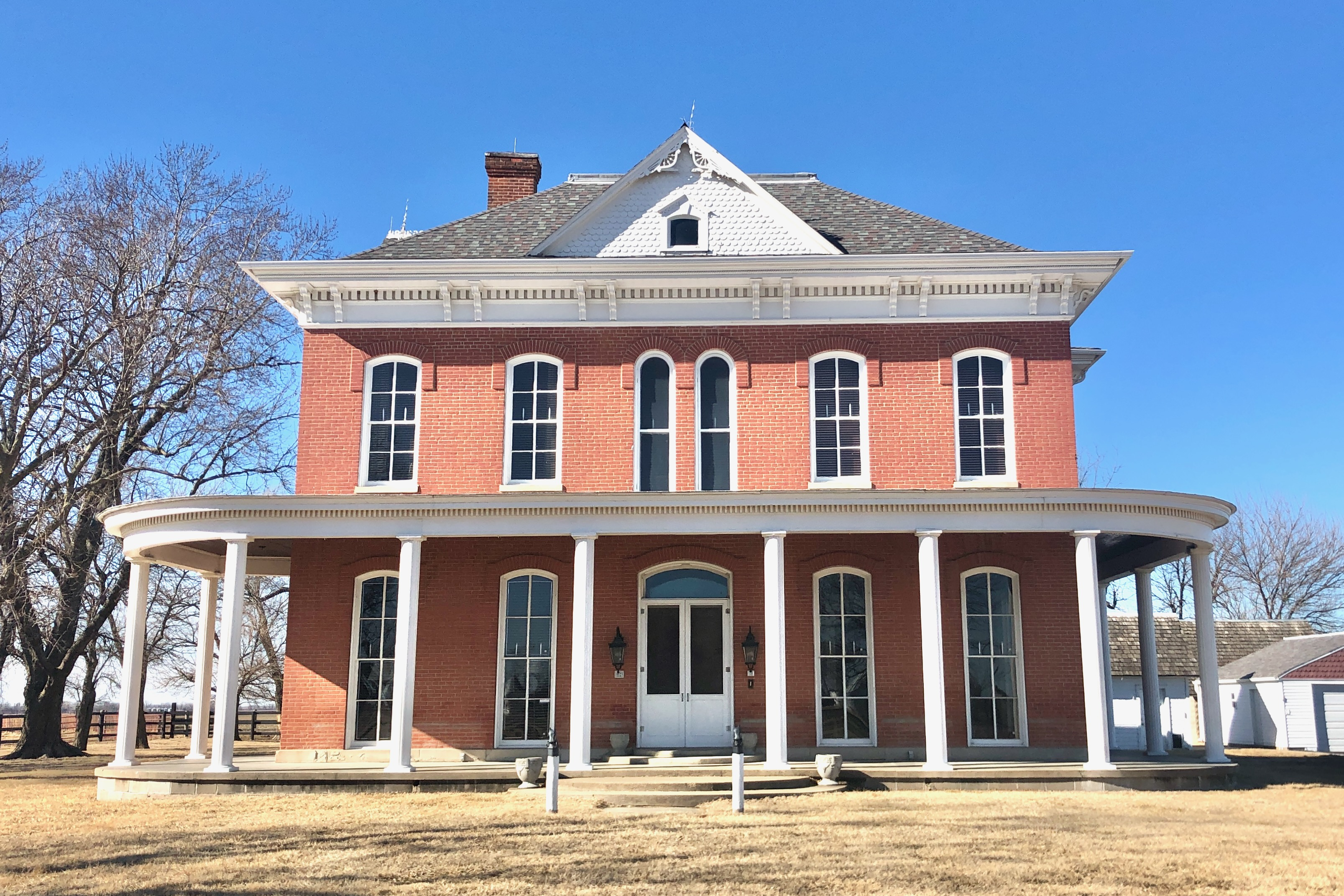
- Thompson-Campell Farmstead at Langdon

- Coordinates: 40°24′02″N 95°36′29″W
- Country: United States
- State: Missouri
- County: Atchison

Area
  - Total: 25.35 sq mi (65.7 km^{2})
  - Land: 24.84 sq mi (64.3 km^{2})
  - Water: 0.51 sq mi (1.3 km^{2}) 2.01%
- Elevation: 892 ft (272 m)

Population (2020)
  - Total: 32
  - Density: 1.3/sq mi (0.50/km^{2})
- FIPS code: 29-00572646
- GNIS feature ID: 766240

Templeton Township is a township in Atchison County, Missouri, United States. At the 2020 census, its population was 32.

Templeton Township was established on February 22, 1870, and named after John W. Templeton, a county official.

== Geography ==
Templeton Township covers an area of 25.35 square miles (65.7 km^{2}) and contains no incorporated settlements. There is an unincorporated community called Langdon in its southeast corner.

Evans Island is a land feature along the Missouri River, in the western portion of the township, which begins south of the mouth of the Nishnabotna River and continues to a point north of Brownville, Nebraska. It is bounded on its east by the State Line Slough and comprises much of the Nishnabotna Conservation Area.

== Transportation ==
Templeton Township contains one airport, Rock Port Municipal Airport.

The following highways travel through the township:

- Interstate 29
- U.S. Route 136
- Route D
- Route E
- Route U
