= Waterloo Township, Iowa =

Township in Iowa, US

Waterloo Township, Allamakee County
- Township
- Coordinates: 43°28′05″N 091°32′42″W
- Country: United States
- State: Iowa
- County: Allamakee

Area
  - Total: 30.07 sq mi (77.87 km^{2})
  - Land: 30.07 sq mi (77.87 km^{2})
  - Water: 0 sq mi (0 km^{2})
- Elevation: 1,079 ft (329 m)

Population (2010)
  - Total: 266
  - Density: 8.8/sq mi (3.4/km^{2})
- Time zone: UTC-6 (CST)
  - Summer (DST): UTC-5 (CDT)
- FIPS code: 19-94596
- GNIS feature ID: 0468950

Waterloo Township is one of eighteen townships in Allamakee County, Iowa, USA. At the 2010 census, its population was 266.

== History ==
Waterloo Township was organized in 1856.

== Geography ==
Waterloo Township covers an area of 30.07 square miles (77.9 km^{2}) and contains no incorporated settlements. It contains the unincorporated community of Dorchester. According to the USGS, it contains four cemeteries: Saint Johns, Saint Marys, Waterloo Ridge and West Waterloo Ridge.
