= McGregor, Iowa =

- City
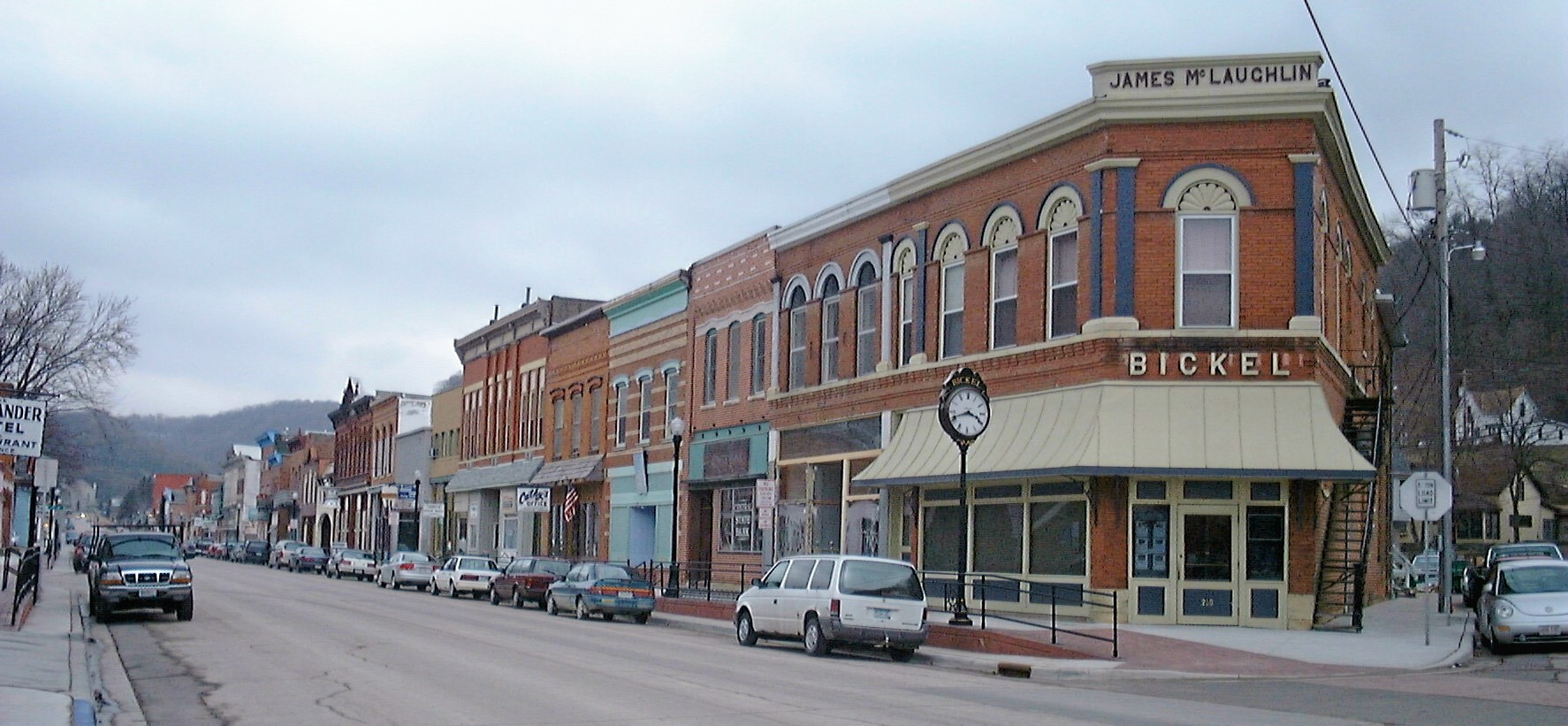
- Downtown McGregor

- Location of McGregor, Iowa
- Coordinates: 43°01′28″N 91°10′55″W
- Country: United States
- State: Iowa
- County: Clayton

Area
  - Total: 1.30 sq mi (3.36 km^{2})
  - Land: 1.29 sq mi (3.35 km^{2})
  - Water: 0 sq mi (0.00 km^{2})
- Elevation: 810 ft (250 m)

Population (2020)
  - Total: 742
  - Density: 573.4/sq mi (221.41/km^{2})
- Time zone: UTC-6 (Central (CST))
  - Summer (DST): UTC-5 (CDT)
- ZIP code: 52157
- Area code: 563
- FIPS code: 19-48000
- GNIS feature ID: 2395069
- Website: www.cityofmcgregoriowa.com

McGregor is a city in Clayton County, Iowa, United States. The population was 742 at the time of the 2020 census. McGregor is located on the Mississippi River across from Prairie du Chien, Wisconsin. Pike's Peak State Park is located just south of the city. Just to the north of McGregor is the city of Marquette. The community of McGregor Heights lies in the southern parts of the city limits.

== History ==
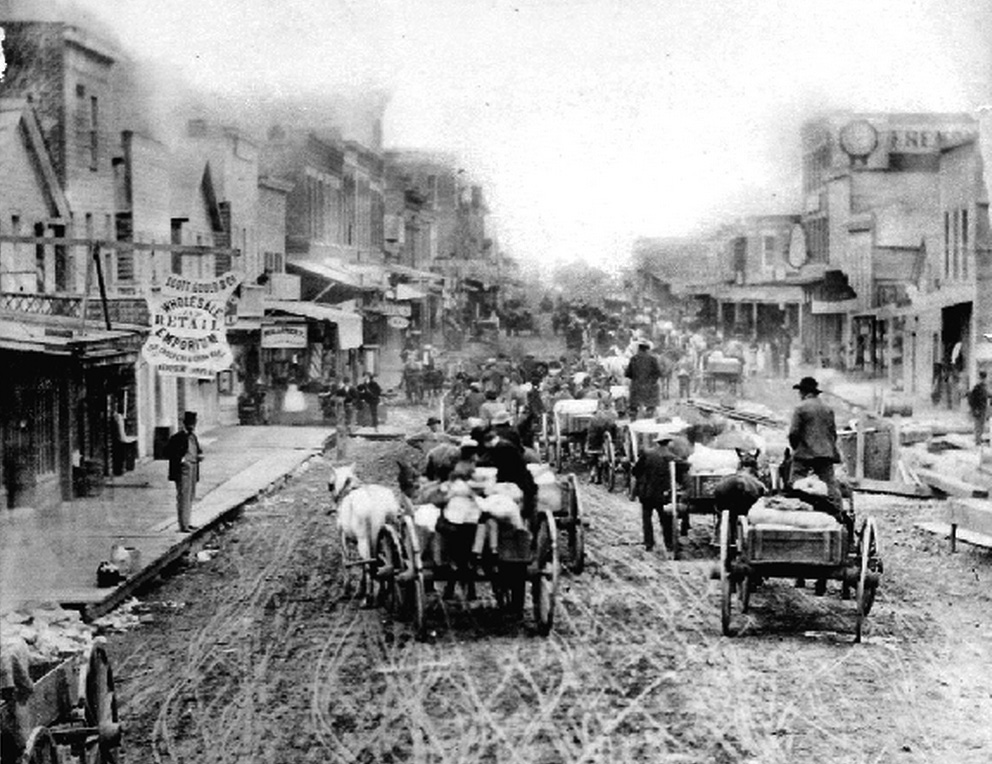
McGregor in 1870

McGregor was founded as MacGregor's Landing in 1847 by Alexandar MacGregor of Clan Gregor, a descendant of Rob Roy MacGregor, and the area around MacGregor's Landing was settled by the extended family. In 1849 it was reported that the original MacGregor seal and signet were owned by Alex MacGregor. The Scots Gaelic clan seal was inscribed, "S' Riogal Mo Dhream/ Een dhn bait spair nocht", which was interpreted as "Royalty is my race / End do and spare not". The signet was a bloodstone from Loch Lomond, and was sketched by William Williams.

Since 1837, MacGregor had been operating a ferry across the Mississippi River between Prairie du Chien, Wisconsin and the present site of McGregor, Iowa. MacGregor planned the new city as a six block development, and it was quickly populated, being incorporated as McGregor in 1857. In that same year, the Milwaukee & Mississippi Railroad finished building a railroad track from Milwaukee, Wisconsin to Prairie du Chien, Wisconsin, thus connecting Lake Michigan with the Mississippi River by rail. McGregor quickly became a major commercial center, and served as a hub where grain from Iowa and Minnesota could be transported across the Mississippi and sent on to Milwaukee via railroad. For example, around 1860, Joseph "Diamond Jo" Reynolds moved to McGregor in order to establish a grain trading business, and later ran his own steam packets. The Diamond Jo office building still stands in the city. More railroads were built to connect McGregor with cities further west, and the city of North McGregor (now Marquette, Iowa) was established just north of the city to serve as the city's railroad terminus. After reaching McGregor from the west, trains were disassembled and railroad cars were ferried across the Mississippi to continue on towards Lake Michigan.

The towns early residents made use of the bedrock to carve cellars into the soft sandstone, used for cold storage and ageing beer; as of 1997 most of the entryways are visible but inaccessible.

In 1874, the system of ferrying railroad cars across the river between North McGregor and Prairie du Chien, Wisconsin, was brought to an end when Prairie du Chien businessman John Lawler commissioned the construction of a permanent pontoon bridge to connect the two cities' rail lines. As the need for men to disassemble and ship trains across the river disappeared, the city's population began to decline.

The city's history is preserved in the McGregor Commercial Historic District, which contains many buildings constructed during the city's boom years. Because of its colorful history and location beside the Mississippi River, the city has become a popular summer tourist destination, and it is known for its many antique stores.

The city was heavily damaged during a storm on July 19, 2017, with the downtown area being particularly hard hit.

== Geography ==
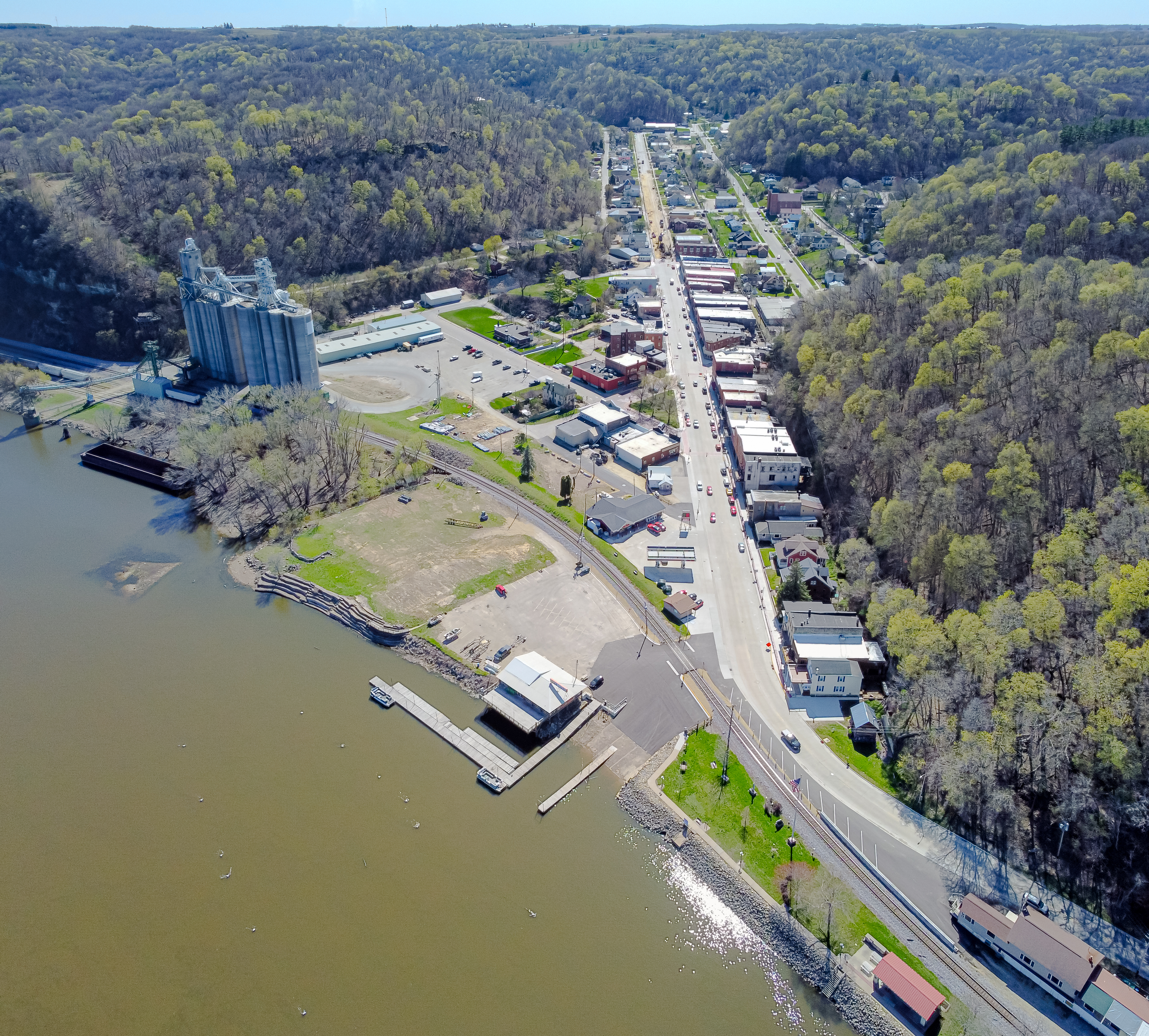
US-18 / Iowa-76 run through town

Mc Gregor lies at the valley floor of nearly vertical sandstone bluffs; the St. Peter Sandstone and Jordan Formation. According to the United States Census Bureau, the city has a total area of 1.30 square miles (3.37 km^{2}), all land.

== Demographics ==
Historical populations
Year	Pop.	±%
1860	1,989	—
1870	2,074	+4.3%
1880	1,602	−22.8%
1890	1,160	−27.6%
1900	1,498	+29.1%
1910	1,259	−16.0%
1920	1,289	+2.4%
1930	1,299	+0.8%
1940	1,309	+0.8%
1950	1,138	−13.1%
1960	1,040	−8.6%
1970	990	−4.8%
1980	945	−4.5%
1990	797	−15.7%
2000	871	+9.3%
2010	871	+0.0%
2020	742	−14.8%
Source:"U.S. Census website". United States Census Bureau. and Iowa Data Center; Source: U.S. Decennial Census

=== 2020 census ===
As of the census of 2020, there were 742 people, 366 households, and 171 families residing in the city. The population density was 573.4 inhabitants per square mile (221.4/km^{2}). There were 488 housing units at an average density of 377.1 per square mile (145.6/km^{2}). The racial makeup of the city was 95.3% White, 0.4% Black or African American, 0.7% Native American, 0.5% Asian, 0.0% Pacific Islander, 0.3% from other races and 2.8% from two or more races. Hispanic or Latino persons of any race comprised 1.5% of the population.

Of the 366 households, 15.6% of which had children under the age of 18 living with them, 37.2% were married couples living together, 7.9% were cohabitating couples, 28.4% had a female householder with no spouse or partner present and 26.5% had a male householder with no spouse or partner present. 53.3% of all households were non-families. 45.4% of all households were made up of individuals, 17.8% had someone living alone who was 65 years old or older.

The median age in the city was 53.2 years. 15.5% of the residents were under the age of 20; 4.0% were between the ages of 20 and 24; 19.5% were from 25 and 44; 29.0% were from 45 and 64; and 31.9% were 65 years of age or older. The gender makeup of the city was 49.9% male and 50.1% female.

=== 2010 census ===
As of the census of 2010, there were 871 people, 410 households, and 225 families living in the city. The population density was 670.0 inhabitants per square mile (258.7/km^{2}). There were 509 housing units at an average density of 391.5 per square mile (151.2/km^{2}). The racial makeup of the city was 96.9% White, 0.1% African American, 0.3% Native American, 0.5% Asian, 0.2% Pacific Islander, and 2.0% from two or more races. Hispanic or Latino of any race were 1.7% of the population.

There were 410 households, of which 20.0% had children under the age of 18 living with them, 39.8% were married couples living together, 11.7% had a female householder with no husband present, 3.4% had a male householder with no wife present, and 45.1% were non-families. 39.0% of all households were made up of individuals, and 16.4% had someone living alone who was 65 years of age or older. The average household size was 2.02 and the average family size was 2.66.

The median age in the city was 48.3 years. 17.8% of residents were under the age of 18; 8.2% were between the ages of 18 and 24; 20% were from 25 to 44; 30.3% were from 45 to 64; and 23.8% were 65 years of age or older. The gender makeup of the city was 48.0% male and 52.0% female.

== Education ==
It is within the MFL MarMac Community School District. The district formed on July 1, 1994 with the merger of the Mar-Mac and M-F-L districts.

== Notable people ==
- Andrew Clemens, sand artist
- Marian E. Hubbard, zoologist, Wellesley professor
- Dorothy M. Johnson, author
- Samuel Merrill, Governor of Iowa from 1868 to 1872
- Joseph "Diamond Joe" Reynolds, steamboat entrepreneur, grain dealer, railroad builder
- Ringling brothers, circus
- Leo Stanton Rowe, director general of the Pan-American Union from 1920 to 1946
- Lucy Maynard Salmon, American historian, Vassar professor
- John Ward Studebaker, U.S. Commissioner of Education from 1934 to 1948
- Lucy Hobbs Taylor, first woman in the world to earn a degree as Doctor of Dental Surgery
- Thomas Updegraff, United States House of Representatives from Iowa
- Frank Lloyd Wright, American architect lived there as an infant from 1867-1869

== See also ==
- 16 to Life
- Effigy Mounds National Monument
