= Perry Creek =

Perry Creek may refer to:

- Perry Creek (British Columbia), a stream in Canada
- Perry Creek (Conasauga River tributary), a stream in Georgia
- Perry Creek (Missouri River), a stream in Iowa

== See also ==
- Perry Run, a stream in Ohio
