= Pine Creek (Canoe Creek tributary) =

Location
- Country: US
- State: Iowa
- District: Winneshiek County, Iowa, Fillmore County, Minnesota

Physical characteristics
- Mouth: Canoe Creek (Upper Iowa River)
  - coordinates: 43.3603°N 91.6489°W

Pine Creek is a tributary to Canoe Creek in the Upper Iowa River watershed in northeast Iowa; see Pine Creek (Upper Iowa River tributary) for the larger nearby stream of the same name.

It runs through Pleasant Township in Winneshiek County. It drains an entirely rural area, with some cleared farmland, but is also forested. The watershed covers 7,205 acres (29.16 km^{2}).

Much of it is contained in the South Pine Creek Wildlife Management Area, maintained by the Iowa Department of Natural Resources. South Pine Creek is one of its tributaries and is noted for its natively-reproducing trout.

The Wildlife Management Area is accessed from County Road W60 (Balsam Road), which has a bridge across the creek. There is a privately owned and operated campground and set of cabins nearby.

== See also ==
- List of rivers of Iowa

== Sources ==
- Statistics on Upper Iowa River (*.pdf)
