= Spruce Creek =

Spruce Creek may refer to:

== Canada ==
- Spruce Creek (British Columbia), a stream in the Atlin Country

== United States ==
Colorado

- Spruce Creek (Larimer County, Colorado), a tributary of the Big Thompson River

Florida

- Spruce Creek Airport, in Port Orange
- Spruce Creek High School, in Port Orange
- Spruce Creek (Florida), a tributary of the Halifax River

Iowa

- Spruce Creek (Iowa) a tributary of the Upper Mississippi River

Maine

- Spruce Creek (Maine), a creek in York County, Maine

New York

- Spruce Creek (New York), crossed by the Salisbury Center Bridge in Herkimer County

Pennsylvania

- Spruce Creek (Pennsylvania), a tributary of the Little Juniata River
- Spruce Creek, Pennsylvania, an unincorporated community
- Spruce Creek Township, Pennsylvania

West Virginia

- Spruce Creek (West Virginia), a stream in Ritchie County
