= Hoosier Creek =

Hoosier Creek may refer to:

- Hoosier Creek, a stream in Franklin County in the U.S. state of Missouri
- Hoosier Creek, a stream in Linn and Johnson counties, Iowa
