= Pine Creek (Upper Iowa River tributary) =

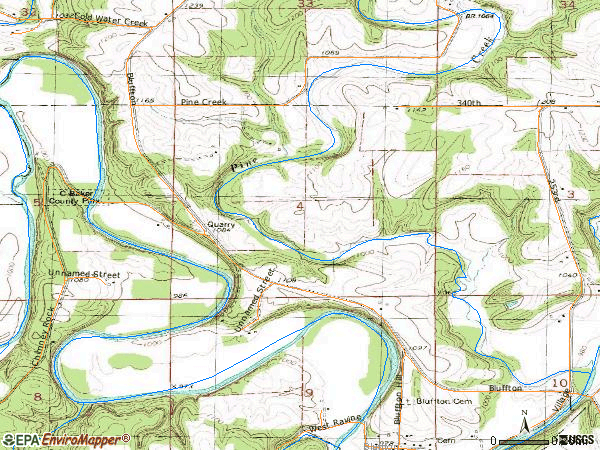
- Pine Creek at its confluence with the Upper Iowa River (United States Environmental Protection Agency)

Location
- Country: US
- State: Iowa, Minnesota
- District: Fillmore County, Minnesota, Winneshiek County, Iowa

Physical characteristics
- Source
  - coordinates: 43.5530°N 91.9657°W
- Mouth: Upper Iowa River
  - coordinates: 43.40886°N 91.8977°W

Pine Creek is a 21.0-mile-long (33.8 km) tributary to the Upper Iowa River in northeastern Iowa; see Pine Creek (Canoe Creek tributary) for the smaller nearby stream of the same name. It rises in southern Fillmore County, Minnesota, between Harmony and Canton, crossing into Winneshiek County, Iowa, in Burr Oak Township in a southwest to southeast direction. It joins the Upper Iowa near Bluffton in Bluffton Township. Its course is essentially rural, with some cleared farmland, but also forested.

== See also ==
- List of rivers of Iowa
