= Norfolk Creek =

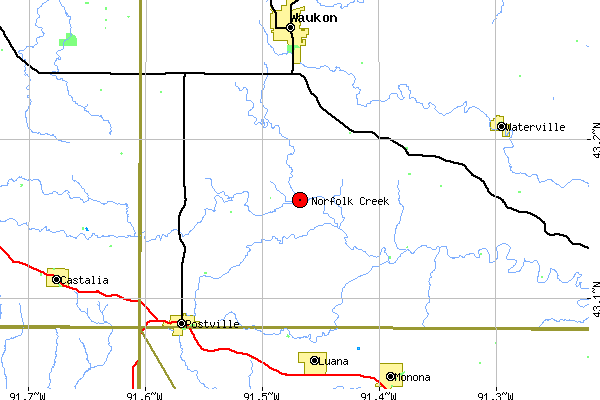
- Norfolk Creek (the red dot highlights its confluence with the Yellow River) (USGS)

Location
- Country: US
- State: Iowa
- District: Allamakee County, Iowa

Physical characteristics
- Source
  - coordinates: 43°15′12″N 91°29′57″W
- Mouth: Yellow River
  - coordinates: 43°09′41″N 91°28′05″W
  - elevation: 827 ft (252 m)

Norfolk Creek is a tributary of the Yellow River in Iowa. 8.9 miles (14.3 km) in length, it rises just to the west of the city of Waukon in Union Prairie and Ludlow townships. It joins the Yellow River in Jefferson Township, Allamakee County. It courses through entirely rural countryside, much of it forested. The original name of this creek was North Fork of the Yellow River. North Fork was later corrupted in usage to Norfolk.

== See also ==
- List of rivers of Iowa
