= Florenceville =

Florenceville may refer to:

- Florenceville, New Brunswick, Canada
  - Florenceville Airport
  - Florenceville Bridge
- Florenceville, Iowa, United States
