= Trout River (Iowa) =

Coordinates: 43.31858°N 91.67126°W

Location
- Country: US
- State: Iowa
- District: Winneshiek County, Iowa

Physical characteristics
- Mouth: Upper Iowa River

The Trout River is a 13.5-mile-long (21.7 km) tributary of the Upper Iowa River in northeastern Iowa. It rises in Frankville Township in Winneshiek County, south of Iowa Highway 9, and flows north to join the Upper Iowa River in Glenwood Township, east of Decorah. It is joined from the west by a major tributary, Trout Creek. The river and creek should not be confused with another Trout Creek (and Trout Run) which flow into the Upper Iowa River 5 miles (8 km) to the west at Decorah.

The river is noted for its excellent trout fishing. Access to the watershed is limited as most of the land is privately owned, but there are points where there is public access.

== See also ==
- List of rivers of Iowa
