= Bear Creek (Yellow River tributary) =

River in Iowa, United States

Coordinates: 43.129°N 91.376°W

Bear Creek, also known as Bear Hollow Creek, is a 6.3-mile-long (10.1 km) tributary of the Yellow River of Iowa, originating in Jefferson Township, near Rossville in Allamakee County. It parallels Allamakee County Road X26 (Rossville/Monona Road). It enters the Yellow River near Volney, approximately where the state of Iowa maintains the Yellow River Valley Canoe and Heritage Trail in Allamakee County.

== See also ==
- List of rivers of Iowa
