= McElroy Creek (High Creek tributary) =

Stream in Iowa and Missouri, U.S.

Coordinates: 40°30′45″N 95°35′08″W

McElroy Creek is a stream in the U.S. states of Iowa and Missouri. It is a tributary of High Creek.

McElroy Creek has the name of A. McElroy, a pioneer judge of Atchison County, Missouri.

== See also ==
- List of rivers of Iowa
- List of rivers of Missouri
