= West Fork of the Little Sioux River =

River in Iowa, United States

The West Fork of the Little Sioux River is a river in the northwestern Iowa, United States. It is a tributary to the Little Sioux River through the Garretson Outlet Ditch within the Missouri River floodplain which it enters at 42°09′44″N 96°05′50″W.

Approximately 95 miles (153 km) long, it courses through northwest Iowa. The headwaters arise north of Marcus in Cherokee County (42°51′55″N 95°47′51″W) and flows generally southwest through farmland in Plymouth and Woodbury counties until the meandered (old) streambed finally meets the Little Sioux River near Turin in Monona County.

However, the lower portion of the river, where the stream leaves the Loess Hills and enters the Missouri River floodplain near Holly Springs, Iowa, has been extensively channelized. Across this floodplain, most of the flow is actually carried by the Garretson and West Fork drainage ditches, which join to become the Monona-Harrison Ditch, which in turn enters the Missouri just upstream from the mouth of the Little Sioux in Harrison County.

== See also ==
- List of Iowa rivers
