= French Creek (Upper Iowa River tributary) =

Stream in Iowa, U.S.

French Creek is a 9.6-mile-long (15.4 km) northward-flowing tributary of the Upper Iowa River, near the latter's confluence with the Mississippi River. It is located in French Creek Township, Allamakee County, Iowa.

Confluence with Upper Iowa River:

== See also ==
- List of rivers of Iowa
