= Camp Hantesa =

Boy Scout camp in Iowa, United States

Coordinates: 42.001824°N 93.899889°W

- Age range: K-12
- Location: Boone, Iowa
- Country: United States
- Founded: 1919
- Founders: Mr. and Mrs. Nelson
- Director: Owen Ballard
- Website www.campfireiowa.org hantesa.wordpress.com

Camp Hantesa is a camp under the Camp Fire Organization that began in 1919 and held one camp session per summer at the Boy Scout Camp near Boone, Iowa. Hantesa welcomes children ages 6–18 to participate in camp crafts and activities in their respective age groups. It was the first camp in America to have a C.I.T. (Counselor In Training) program consisting of L.C.'s (Junior Apprentices) and Apprentices ages 15–18. Hantesa's programs emphasize camping and other outdoor activities for youth.

== History ==
Hantesa was founded in the summer of 1919 by Mr. and Mrs. Nelson. Its first session was held at Ledges State Park and cost $6. There were 36 girls in attendance August 23-September 6. The first camp director was Mrs. Nelson and she was camp director until Mrs. Gen stepped in after Mrs. Nelson's passing. During The Great Flood of 1993 Camp Hantesa was hit hard by The Des Moines River which only lies 300 yards away. The flooding was so bad that campers could fish off the deck of Clayton Lodge, yet even though camp was nearly all underwater, sessions continued. Camp was then given a donation of approximately $64,000 from Billy Ray Cyrus. Billy Ray Cyrus also helped build many buildings and cabins on camp.

== Buildings on Camp ==
- The Library: First cabin on camp and was turned into a health lodge in 1928.
- Drama Center: Used to be an art center and then was changed to the fly up lodge in 1948.
- Miles: Second building on camp and was used as a mess hall until the late 1970s and then became the art center.
- Nature Nook: Little building next to Miles and was the original trading post when camp first opened and was the mail room until 1998.
- Clayton: The main lodge and the most recognizable building on camp. It is used as the dining hall most of the time, but will sometimes be used for parties and other recreational activities. Seats 1000 on the floor and 600 in tables. Four entrances are set to the North, South, East and West on the compass.
- Gens Place: Built in 1953 for camp director Miss Gen and was remodeled and winterized in 1977.
- Cooks Cabin: Built behind Miles in 1950 for permanent cooks.
- Brown House: Built in 1978 for the maintenance crew.
- Showers: Built in 1961 and the closed rooms were the staff showers until 1998.
- Health Lodge: Built in 1968 as a gift from the Junior Des Moines Chamber of Commerce.
- Pool Complex: Was rebuilt in 1998 and has been re-modeled 4 different times.
- Contipo: Ape directors lodge and is hidden in the forest and was built in 1933 for Mr.Nelson.
- V.C.: Variety Center was built in 1989 as a conference and recreation center for outside groups and used as a cabin for the BK’s (Big Kids, adults returning to camp as campers).
- Cyrus: Completed in 1991 and remodeling due to flood damage was donated by Billy Ray Cyrus
- Sun, Sky, and Garden Rooms: Restrooms on the main side of camp.
- Magic Hill: This was a spot chosen by campers in 1924 and every Sunday that Hantesa is in session, there is a service held there.
- Hermans Ranch: Used to be home to a herd of 14 horses which consist of Max, Red, Winnie, Kipper, Goblin, Shadow, Star, Honey, Sand, Corky, Pecos (Burrito), Socks, Jackie, and Rascal. Riding Day Camp and Hermans Resident Camp, go up to Hermans Ranch everyday and ride. Residents and Day Campers are offered one horse ride for an additional fee.
