= Broken Kettle Creek =

Coordinates: 42°37′55″N 96°30′46″W

Broken Kettle Creek is a 25-mile-long (40 km) stream in Plymouth County, Iowa. It is a tributary of the Big Sioux River. The creek rises in Preston Township, flows generally south by southwest, and meets the Big Sioux River in Hancock Township, approximately three miles northeast of Jefferson, South Dakota.

== See also ==
- List of rivers of Iowa
