= Little Sioux River =

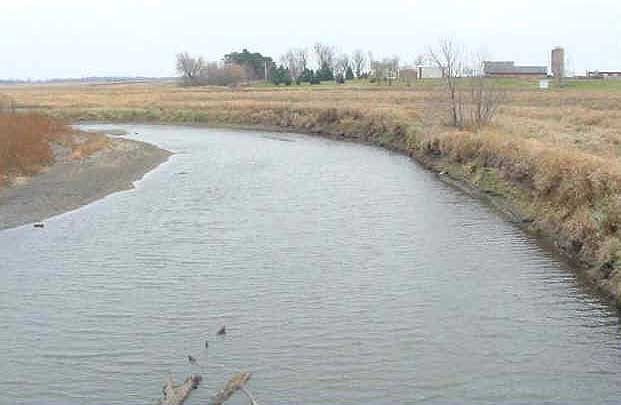
- The Little Sioux River upstream of Spencer, Iowa

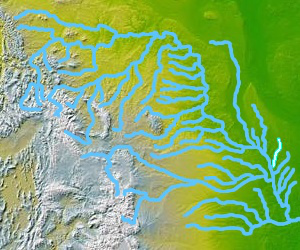
- The Little Sioux River, highlighted on a map of the watershed of the Missouri River

- Location within Iowa
- Native name: Eaneah-waudepon (Lakota)

Location
- Country: United States
- State: Iowa and Minnesota
- Counties: Jackson County, Minnesota; Iowa: Harrison, Monona, Woodbury, Ida, Cherokee, Obrien, Clay, Buena Vista, Dickinson, Jackson

Physical characteristics
- Source
  - location: Okabena
  - coordinates: 43°39′52″N 95°18′53″W
- Mouth
  - location: Little Sioux
  - coordinates: 41°48′11″N 96°03′58″W
- Length: 258 mi-long (415 km)

Basin features
- River system: Missouri River

The Little Sioux River is a river in the United States. It rises in southwestern Minnesota near the Iowa border, and continues to flow southwest for 258 miles (415 km) across northwest Iowa into the Missouri River at Little Sioux. The Little Sioux River was known as Íƞyaƞ Yaƞká Wakpá or "Stone River" to the Dakota people. Its tributaries include the Ocheyedan River, Maple River and the West Fork of the Little Sioux River. The Little Sioux River is integral to the Nepper Watershed Project, a major Iowa flood control and soil conservation program that was introduced in 1947.

At Turin, Iowa, the Little Sioux River has a mean annual discharge of 1,761 cubic feet per second.

== History ==
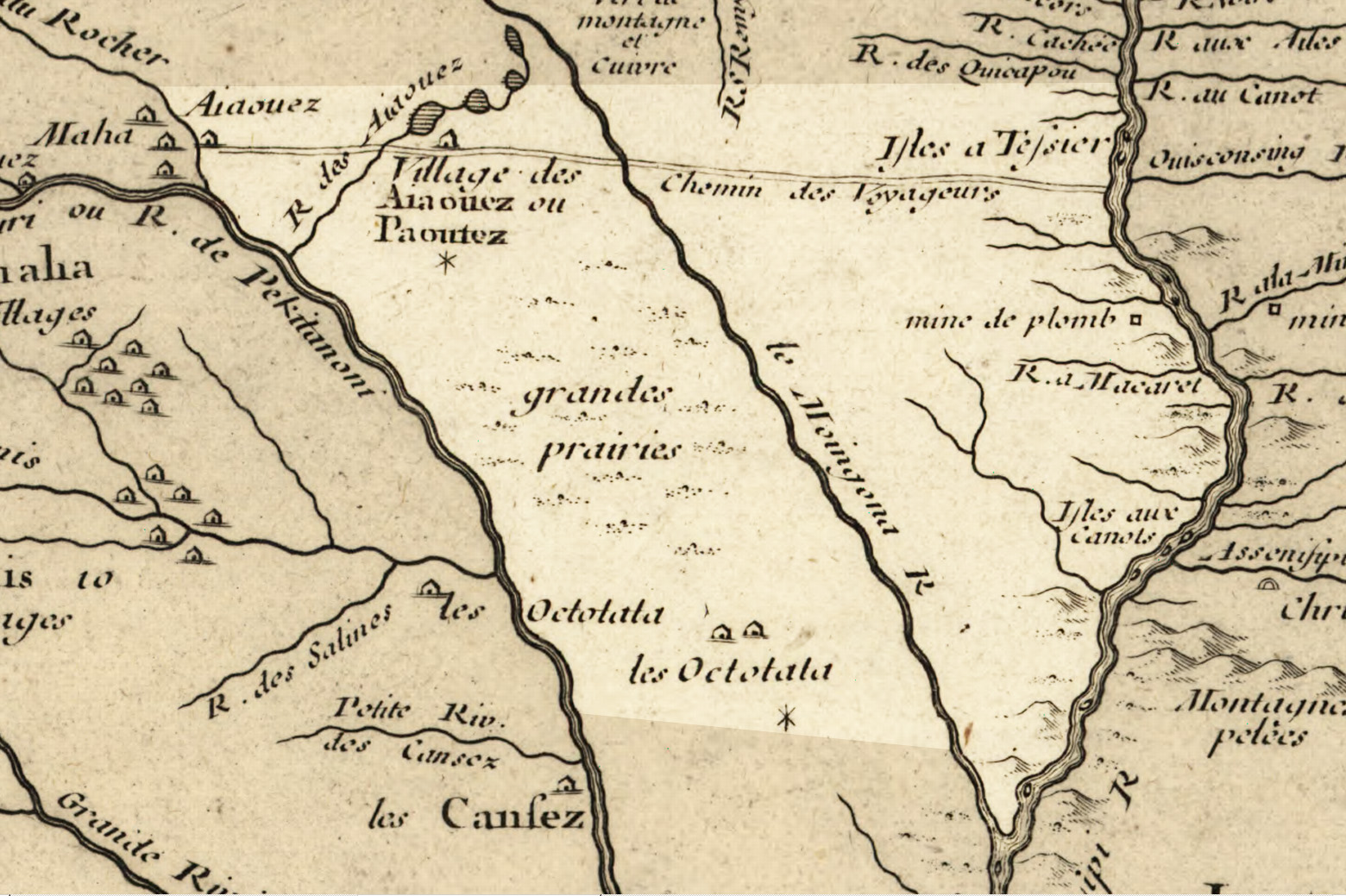
Rivière des Aiaouez meaning "River of the Ioways" labeled on this 1718 French map (the river today known as the Iowa River is shown but not labeled).

Prior to the sale of French Louisiana to the United States, the river was known as the Rivière des Aiaouez meaning "River of the Ioways".

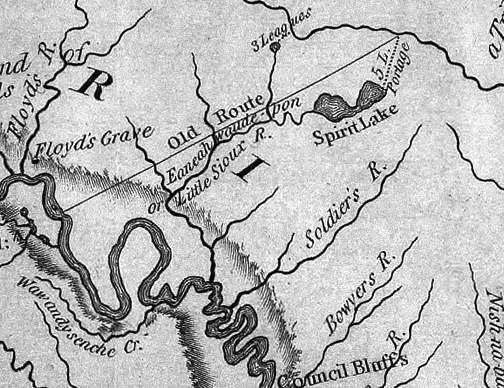
This excerpt from the Lewis and Clark map of 1814 shows the rivers of western Iowa. The Little Sioux is seen at the left center of the map.

The Little Sioux Valley was important in the Spirit Lake Massacre of 1857, when the Santee Sioux chief Inkpaduta made forays as far downstream as Smithland. The river valley also figures prominently in folklore about the nineteenth century outlaw, Jesse James, who reportedly used the secluded valley, with its wooded ravines, as a hideout and a route north to Minnesota during the 1870s.

== Geology ==
Geologically, the Little Sioux rises in a region of glacial potholes near the "Iowa Great Lakes" (Spirit Lake, and East and West Okoboji). It then traverses a rich agricultural region on its way to the Loess Hills, from which it then flows out onto the floodplain of the Missouri River. Through much of its middle course (i.e., from Linn Grove to Smithland) the Little Sioux is a relatively wild meandered stream, with excellent canoeing, camping, and fishing opportunities. However, from Smithland downstream to its mouth, the river has been channelized and environmentally degraded.

== Flooding ==
Flooding of the river is common in early to late spring, as the often-heavy winter snow melts. This has resulted in riparian woodlands of cottonwood trees adjacent to fertile farm ground on the bottomlands. Correspondingly, hunters are rewarded with a bounty of white-tailed deer, rabbits and pheasants during the fall hunting season.

== Fishing ==
Fishing opportunities are best in late spring after flood waters have dissipated. Edible gamefish such as bullhead and channel catfish are frequently caught with nothing more than a hook and worm, with northern pike, walleye, and shovelnose sturgeon also available.

== See also ==
- List of rivers of Iowa
- List of rivers of Minnesota
- Tributaries of the Missouri River
