= List of rivers of Iowa =

The following is a list of rivers and streams in Iowa. The rivers are listed by multiple arrangements:

- those that form part of the boundaries of the U.S. state of Iowa;
- ordered by drainage basin, with tributaries indented under each larger river's name;
- ordered alphabetically.

== Rivers on the boundary ==
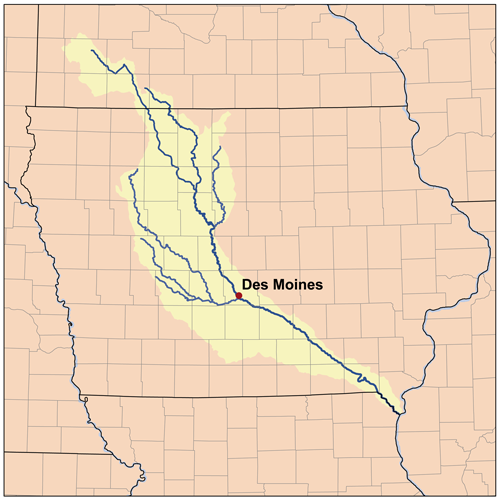
Des Moine River

- Mississippi River (Illinois, Wisconsin)
- Missouri River (Nebraska)
- Big Sioux River (South Dakota)
- Des Moines River (20 mi or 32 km of the boundary with Missouri)

== By drainage basin ==
This list is arranged by drainage basin, with respective tributaries indented under each larger stream's name. All Iowa rivers are part of the Mississippi River Watershed, which in Iowa consists of the Upper Mississippi River Drainage Basin and the Missouri River Drainage Basin.

=== Upper Mississippi River drainage basin ===
- Mississippi River
  - Fabius River (MO)
    - North Fabius River
  - Wyaconda River
  - Fox River
    - Little Fox River
  - Des Moines River
    - Competine Creek
    - White Breast Creek
    - South River
    - Middle River
    - North River
    - Raccoon River
      - North Raccoon River
      - South Raccoon River
        - Middle Raccoon River
    - Beaver Creek
    - Pea's Creek
      - Davis Creek
    - Boone River
      - White Fox Creek
    - Lizard Creek
    - East Fork Des Moines River
  - Skunk River
    - Cedar Creek
    - North Skunk River
    - South Skunk River
      - Thunder Creek
      - Ioway Creek
  - Flint River
  - Iowa River
    - Cedar River
      - Wolf Creek
      - Black Hawk Creek
      - Beaver Creek
      - West Fork Cedar River
        - Shell Rock River
          - Winnebago River
            - Lime Creek
      - Little Cedar River
    - English River
      - North English River
        - Middle English River
        - Deep River
      - South English River
    - South Fork Iowa River
    - East Branch Iowa River
    - West Branch Iowa River
  - Duck Creek
  - Wapsipinicon River
    - Buffalo Creek
    - Little Wapsipinicon River (south)
    - Little Wapsipinicon River (north)
  - Elk River
  - Maquoketa River
    - North Fork Maquoketa River
      - Farmers Creek
  - Mill Creek
  - Spruce Creek
  - Tete Des Morts Creek
  - Catfish Creek
  - Bee Branch Creek
  - Little Maquoketa River
    - Cloie Branch
  - Turkey River
    - Little Turkey River (Clayton County, Iowa)
    - Volga River
    - Little Turkey River (Fayette County, Iowa)
  - Yellow River
    - Bear Creek
    - Norfolk Creek
  - Upper Iowa River
    - French Creek
    - Bear Creek
      - Waterloo Creek
    - Canoe Creek
      - Pine Creek (Canoe Creek)
    - Trout River
    - Pine Creek (Upper Iowa River tributary)
  - Minnesota River (MN)
    - Blue Earth River
      - Middle Branch Blue Earth River
      - West Branch Blue Earth River

=== Missouri River drainage basin ===
- Missouri River
  - Chariton River
    - South Fork Chariton River
  - Grand River
    - Thompson River
      - Weldon River
        - Little River
  - Platte River
    - One Hundred and Two River
      - West Fork One Hundred and Two River
      - Middle Fork One Hundred and Two River
      - East Fork One Hundred and Two River
  - Nodaway River
    - East Nodaway River
      - East Fork East Nodaway River
    - West Nodaway River
      - Middle Nodaway River
      - West Fork Middle Nodaway River
        - Rutt Branch
  - Tarkio River
  - Nishnabotna River
    - East Nishnabotna River
    - West Nishnabotna River
      - Walnut Creek
      - Silver Creek
      - East Branch West Nishnabotna River
      - West Fork West Nishnabotna River
  - Keg Creek
  - Mosquito Creek
  - Boyer River
    - Willow River
    - East Boyer River
  - Soldier River
    - East Soldier River
      - Middle Soldier River
  - Little Sioux River
    - Maple River
    - Ocheyedan River
      - Little Ocheyedan River
    - West Fork Little Sioux River
  - Floyd River
    - West Branch Floyd River
      - Little Floyd River
  - Perry Creek
  - Big Sioux River
    - Broken Kettle Creek
    - Rock River
      - Little Rock River

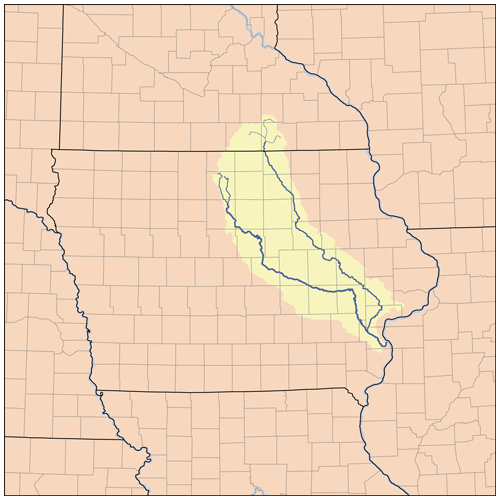
Iowa river

== Alphabetically ==
- Bear Creek (Upper Iowa River tributary)
- Bear Creek (Yellow River tributary)
- Beaver Creek (Cedar River tributary)
- Beaver Creek (Des Moines River tributary)
- Bee Branch Creek
- Big Sioux River
- Black Hawk Creek
- Blue Earth River
- Boone River
- Boyer River
- Broken Kettle Creek
- Buck Creek (Mississippi River tributary)
- Buffalo Creek (Wapsipinicon River tributary)
- Canoe Creek
- Catfish Creek
- Cedar River
- Chariton River
- Cloie Branch
- Competine Creek
- Davis Creek
- Deep River
- Des Moines River
- East Fork One Hundred and Two River
- East Nodaway River
- Elk River
- English River
- Farmers Creek
- Flint River
- Floyd River
- Fox River
- French Creek
- Grand River
- Iowa River
- Ioway Creek
- Lime Creek
- Little Cedar River
- Little Fox River
- Little Maquoketa River
- Little Ocheyedan River
- Little River
- Little Rock River
- Little Sioux River
- Little Turkey River (Clayton County, Iowa)
- Little Turkey River (Fayette County, Iowa)
- Little Wapsipinicon River (north)
- Little Wapsipinicon River (south)
- Maple River
- Maquoketa River
- Middle Fork One Hundred and Two River
- Middle Nodaway River
- Middle River
- Mill Creek
- Mississippi River
- Missouri River
- Mosquito Creek
- Nishnabotna River
- Nodaway River
- Norfolk Creek
- North Fabius River
- North River
- Ocheyedan River
- Pea's Creek
- Perry Creek
- Pine Creek (Canoe Creek)
- Pine Creek (Upper Missouri River tributary)
- Platte River
- Raccoon River
- Rock Creek (Missouri River tributary)
- Rock Creek (Wapsipinicon River tributary)
- Rock River
- Rutt Branch
- Shell Rock River
- Skunk River
- Soldier River
- South River
- Spruce Creek
- Tarkio River
- Tete Des Morts Creek
- Thompson River
- Thunder Creek
- Trout River
- Turkey River
- Upper Iowa River
- Volga River
- Wapsipinicon River
- Waterloo Creek
- Weldon River
- West Fork of the Little Sioux River
- West Fork One Hundred and Two River
- West Nodaway River
- White Breast Creek
- White Fox Creek
- Winnebago River
- Wyaconda River
- Yellow River

== See also ==
- List of rivers in the United States
- State Line Slough (Iowa)
