= Little Maquoketa River Mounds State Preserve =

Protected area in Minnesota, United States

Coordinates: 42.56077°N 90.7152°W

The Little Maquoketa River Mounds State Preserve is a state-owned archaeological site and natural area located within the city of Sageville, Iowa, just north of Dubuque, on U.S. Highway 52.

It is high up on a limestone ridge above the Little Maquoketa River, not too far from the river's mouth with the Upper Mississippi River. Covering about 42 acres (170,000 m^{2}), it contains a fenced-in 3-acre (12,000 m^{2}) burial area with 32 mounds. The graves have been related to the Late Woodland culture, about AD 700-1200. Significant consultation went on with Native American tribes regarding the establishment of the preserve.

The land was purchased by the Iowa Department of Transportation in 1977, and in 1981, it became a state archaeological and geological preserve. By agreement with the state, the Dubuque County Conservation Board maintains and administers the area.

The remainder of the preserve functions as a park with a hiking trail, featuring mature forest and a segment of native blufftop prairie. As a part of the Driftless Area of Iowa, it has some geologically interesting areas, particularly the high limestone bluffs.

There is a parking lot. Access is year-round.

== See also ==
- Archaeology of Iowa
- Mound
- Mound builder (people)
- Earthwork (archaeology)

== Sources ==
- Little Maquoketa River Mounds State Preserve, Iowa Department of Natural Resources, Archived from the original on August 4, 2025, Retrieved November 8, 2025
- Iowa State Preserves, Iowa Department of Natural Resources, Archived from the original on September 29, 2025, Retrieved November 8, 2025
- Dubuque County Conservation Board, Archived from the original on October 6, 2025, Retrieved November 8, 2025
- "Little Maquoketa Mounds". protectedplanet.net. Archived from the original on August 14, 2016.
