= Lime Springs, Iowa =

- City
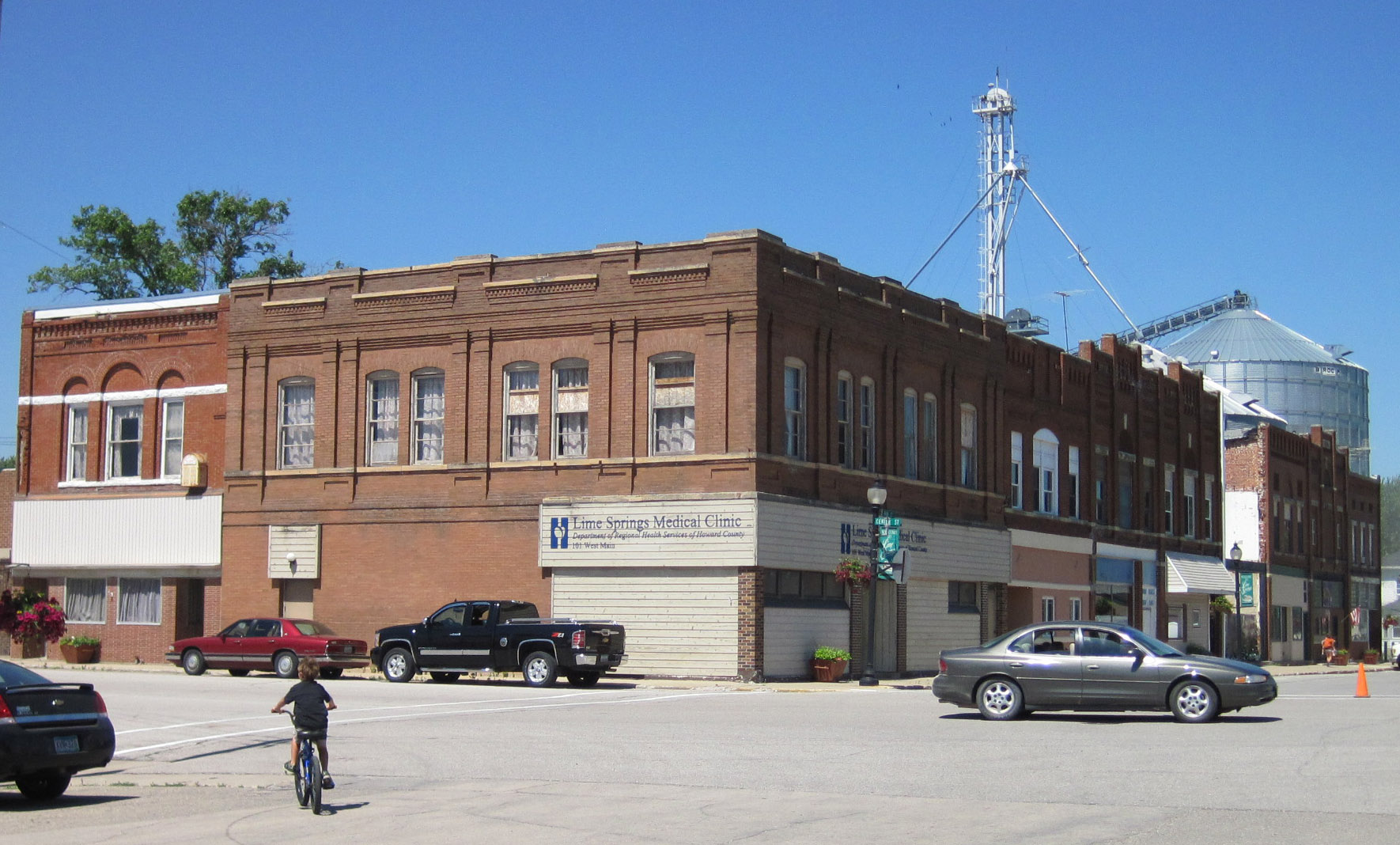
- Downtown Lime Springs

- Location of Lime Springs, Iowa
- Coordinates: 43°27′00″N 92°17′03″W
- Country: United States
- State: Iowa
- County: Howard
- Incorporated: April 17, 1876

Area
  - Total: 1.02 sq mi (2.63 km^{2})
  - Land: 1.02 sq mi (2.63 km^{2})
  - Water: 0 sq mi (0.00 km^{2})
- Elevation: 1,247 ft (380 m)

Population (2020)
  - Total: 473
  - Density: 466.0/sq mi (179.92/km^{2})
- Time zone: UTC-6 (Central (CST))
  - Summer (DST): UTC-5 (CDT)
- ZIP code: 52155
- Area code: 563
- FIPS code: 19-45165
- GNIS feature ID: 2395709
- Website: www.limesprings.com/wp/

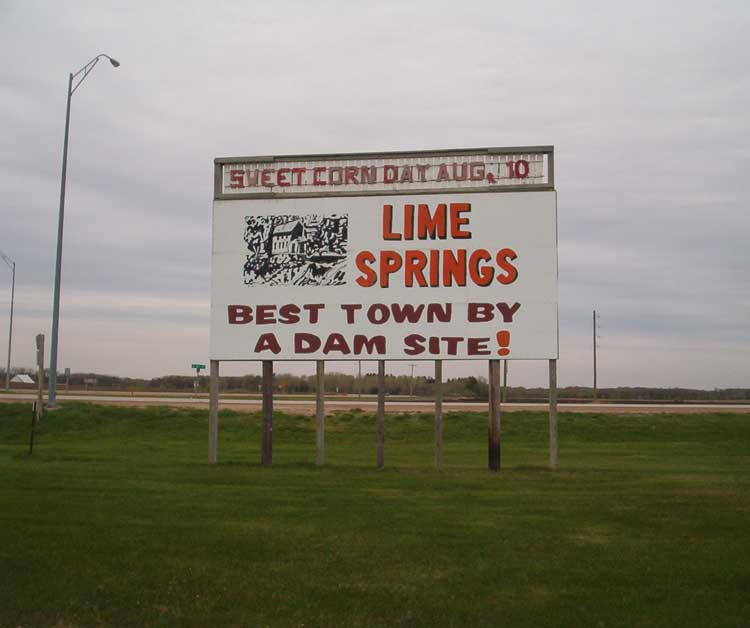

Lime Springs is a city in Howard County, Iowa, United States. The population was 473 at the time of the 2020 census.

== History ==
The Old Town of Lime Springs was platted in 1857. After the railroad was built into the area, the town relocated nearby to its tracks. The town, then called Lime Springs Station, was platted again in 1867.

== Geography ==
The town center originally existed a little farther to the north around the Lidtke Mill on the Upper Iowa River, but moved south when the railroad came to town.

According to the United States Census Bureau, the city has a total area of 1.02 square miles (2.64 km^{2}), all of it land.

=== Climate ===
Climate data for Lime Springs, Iowa
Month	Jan	Feb	Mar	Apr	May	Jun	Jul	Aug	Sep	Oct	Nov	Dec	Year
Record high °F (°C)	59 (15)	63 (17)	83 (28)	91 (33)	93 (34)	100 (38)	102 (39)	101 (38)	98 (37)	92 (33)	75 (24)	62 (17)	102 (39)
Mean daily maximum °F (°C)	23 (−5)	28 (−2)	41 (5)	57 (14)	69 (21)	78 (26)	82 (28)	80 (27)	72 (22)	59 (15)	42 (6)	27 (−3)	55 (13)
Daily mean °F (°C)	14 (−10)	19 (−7)	31 (−1)	45 (7)	57 (14)	67 (19)	71 (22)	69 (21)	60 (16)	47 (8)	33 (1)	19 (−7)	44 (7)
Mean daily minimum °F (°C)	5 (−15)	9 (−13)	21 (−6)	33 (1)	44 (7)	55 (13)	59 (15)	57 (14)	47 (8)	35 (2)	23 (−5)	10 (−12)	33 (1)
Record low °F (°C)	−35 (−37)	−36 (−38)	−29 (−34)	−1 (−18)	21 (−6)	34 (1)	40 (4)	34 (1)	24 (−4)	10 (−12)	−16 (−27)	−30 (−34)	−36 (−38)
Average precipitation inches (mm)	1.0 (25)	1.0 (25)	1.9 (48)	3.5 (89)	4.1 (100)	5.2 (130)	4.5 (110)	5.3 (130)	3.8 (97)	2.5 (64)	2.1 (53)	1.4 (36)	36.3 (907)
Source: weather.com

== Demographics ==
Historical populations
Year	Pop.	±%
1880	470	—
1890	550	+17.0%
1900	605	+10.0%
1910	498	−17.7%
1920	595	+19.5%
1930	539	−9.4%
1940	567	+5.2%
1950	551	−2.8%
1960	581	+5.4%
1970	497	−14.5%
1980	476	−4.2%
1990	438	−8.0%
2000	496	+13.2%
2010	505	+1.8%
2020	473	−6.3%
Source:"U.S. Census website". United States Census Bureau. and Iowa Data Center; Source: U.S. Decennial Census

=== 2020 census ===
As of the census of 2020, there were 473 people, 220 households, and 129 families residing in the city. The population density was 466.0 inhabitants per square mile (179.9/km^{2}). There were 246 housing units at an average density of 242.3 per square mile (93.6/km^{2}). The racial makeup of the city was 88.2% White, 0.0% Black or African American, 1.5% Native American, 0.8% Asian, 0.0% Pacific Islander, 0.4% from other races and 9.1% from two or more races. Hispanic or Latino persons of any race comprised 7.6% of the population.

Of the 220 households, 27.3% of which had children under the age of 18 living with them, 45.9% were married couples living together, 6.4% were cohabitating couples, 24.5% had a female householder with no spouse or partner present and 23.2% had a male householder with no spouse or partner present. 41.4% of all households were non-families. 34.5% of all households were made up of individuals, 15.9% had someone living alone who was 65 years old or older.

The median age in the city was 41.9 years. 23.3% of the residents were under the age of 20; 5.5% were between the ages of 20 and 24; 25.2% were from 25 and 44; 27.7% were from 45 and 64; and 18.4% were 65 years of age or older. The gender makeup of the city was 49.3% male and 50.7% female.

=== 2010 census ===
As of the census of 2010, there were 505 people, 238 households, and 143 families residing in the city. The population density was 495.1 inhabitants per square mile (191.2/km^{2}). There were 253 housing units at an average density of 248.0 per square mile (95.8/km^{2}). The racial makeup of the city was 99.4% White, 0.2% Native American, and 0.4% Asian. Hispanic or Latino of any race were 0.4% of the population.

There were 238 households, of which 26.5% had children under the age of 18 living with them, 47.5% were married couples living together, 9.2% had a female householder with no husband present, 3.4% had a male householder with no wife present, and 39.9% were non-families. 35.3% of all households were made up of individuals, and 18.1% had someone living alone who was 65 years of age or older. The average household size was 2.12 and the average family size was 2.77.

The median age in the city was 45.4 years. 23.4% of residents were under the age of 18; 4.8% were between the ages of 18 and 24; 21.2% were from 25 to 44; 27.9% were from 45 to 64; and 22.6% were 65 years of age or older. The gender makeup of the city was 49.5% male and 50.5% female.

=== 2000 census ===
As of the census of 2000, there were 496 people, 220 households, and 144 families residing in the city. The population density was 487.8 inhabitants per square mile (188.3/km^{2}). There were 243 housing units at an average density of 239.0 per square mile (92.3/km^{2}). The racial makeup of the city was 98.39% White, 0.40% Native American, 0.60% Asian, and 0.60% from two or more races. Hispanic or Latino of any race were 1.01% of the population.

There were 220 households, out of which 29.1% had children under the age of 18 living with them, 53.6% were married couples living together, 10.9% had a female householder with no husband present, and 34.1% were non-families. 31.4% of all households were made up of individuals, and 16.4% had someone living alone who was 65 years of age or older. The average household size was 2.25 and the average family size was 2.81.

In the city, the population was spread out, with 25.2% under the age of 18, 5.6% from 18 to 24, 26.4% from 25 to 44, 17.3% from 45 to 64, and 25.4% who were 65 years of age or older. The median age was 41 years. For every 100 females, there were 87.2 males. For every 100 females age 18 and over, there were 91.2 males.

The median income for a household in the city was $33,750, and the median income for a family was $39,063. Males had a median income of $30,000 versus $21,776 for females. The per capita income for the city was $15,706. About 5.2% of families and 5.9% of the population were below the poverty line, including 5.5% of those under age 18 and 6.8% of those age 65 or over.

== Arts and culture ==
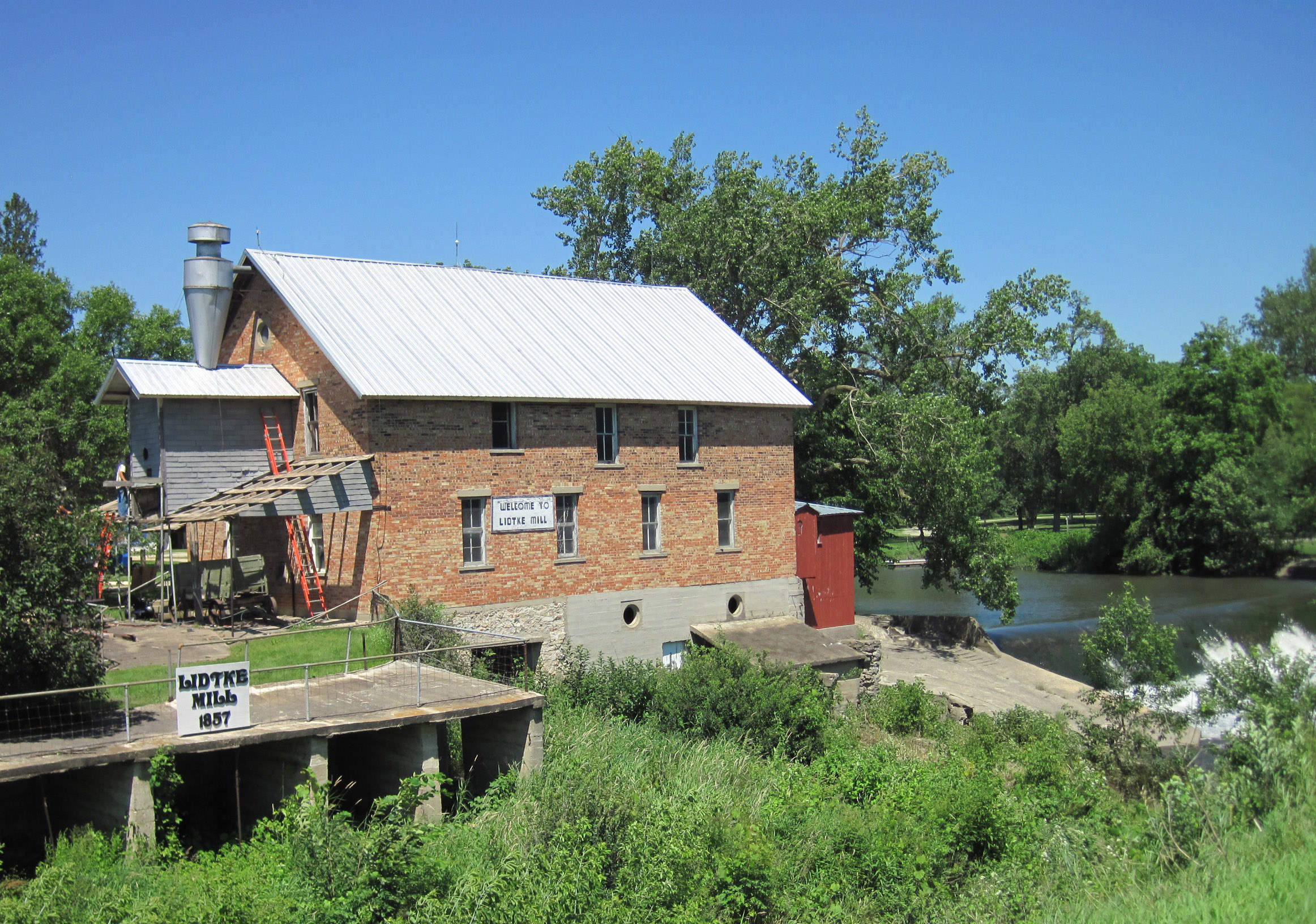
Lidtke Mill.

Sweet Corn Days is the festival of the year in Lime Springs, held on the second Sunday in August. Festivities start Thursday and go thru Sunday. Friday and Saturday are filled with tractor pulls, softball games, and activities for the whole family. And there is much for kids to do at Brown Park. Friday has music and Saturday night features live music and a street dance. Beer tent open Thursday night thru Saturday night. Sunday features free sweet corn and a parade. Most windows around town are decorated with "Rocky the Raccoon" the Sweet Corn Days mascot.

The historic Lidtke Mill converted into a museum is a popular attraction.

== Education ==
Howard–Winneshiek Community School District operates public schools. The district was formed from the merger of the Cresco, Lime Springs/Chester, Elma, and Ridgeway school districts, opening on July 1, 1960.

In 2015 the district board voted to close the Lime Springs-Chester Elementary School on a 4–1 basis.

== Notable people ==
- Gertrude Stanton (1863-1931), American optometrist
