= White Breast Creek =

River in Iowa, US

- Mouth of White Breast Creek (United States Environmental Protection Agency)

Location
- Country: US
- State: Iowa
- District: Marion County, Iowa, Clarke County, Iowa, Lucas County, Iowa, Warren County, Iowa

Physical characteristics
- Source
  - coordinates: 41°01′45″N 93°53′33″W
- Mouth: Des Moines River
  - coordinates: 41°23′43″N 93°02′19″W
  - elevation: 742 ft (226 m)
- Discharge
  - location: Dallas, Iowa
  - average: 243 cu/ft. per sec.

Basin features
- GNIS feature ID: 462975

White Breast Creek is an important tributary of the Des Moines River in Iowa. It flows 91.3 miles (146.9 km) from southwest to northeast, rising in Ward Township in Union County, west of Osceola, and flowing in an easterly then a northeasterly direction, to its mouth with the Des Moines River at Lake Red Rock.

== Tributaries ==
Its first main tributary is South White Breast Creek, on its left bank; this creek has intermittent tributaries named Hoosier Creek and Little Hoosier Creek in Green Bay Township in Clarke County.

Brush Creek enters as a right bank tributary south of Lucas, in the Lucas Unit of the Stephens State Forest Wildlife Management Area, in Jackson Township of Lucas County. Indian Creek joins in Liberty Township, also on the left bank.

Little White Breast Creek enters from the right bank, also in Liberty Township in Lucas County. This creek rises north and east of Chariton from Lake Morris and Lake Ellis, two small reservoirs.

The next three left bank tributaries are Barker Creek, a short stream confined to Liberty Township in Lucas County; Stoney Creek then Cotton Creek join White Breast Creek near Lacona.

Wolf Creek and its tributary, Flank Creek enter on the left bank in Dallas Township, a few miles west of Dallas. A few miles north of Dallas, the creek has a significant floodplain, regularly subject to inundation.

Hawk Run is the last significant tributary, entering near Lake Red Rock on the left bank.

== See also ==
- List of rivers of Iowa
