= South River (Iowa) =

Location
- Country: United States
- State: Iowa
- District: Warren County

Physical characteristics
- Source
  - location: US
  - coordinates: 41.3165°N 93.744°W
- Mouth
  - location: US
  - coordinates: 41.487°N 93.342°W
- Discharge
  - location: Ackworth, Iowa
  - average: 295 cu/ft. per sec.

South River is a river in the U.S. state of Iowa that stretches for 61.30 miles (98.7 km). It is a relatively small river, rarely exceeding a width of 30 feet (9 m) or a depth of 5 feet (1.5 m).

The river ultimately merges with the Des Moines River and subsequently flows into Lake Red Rock.

== Recreation ==
South River offers many sources of leisure activities such as fishing and swimming. The river holds catfish (of all sorts), bass, bluegill, carp, gar, drum, and many other less common species. It is also a great place to go swimming in the summer.

== See also ==
- List of rivers of Iowa
