= Maple River (Iowa) =

Location
- Country: US
- State: Iowa

Physical characteristics
- Source
  - location: Iowa, US
- Mouth
  - location: Turin, Iowa, US
  - coordinates: 41.999°N 95.982°W
- Discharge
  - location: Mapleton, Iowa
  - average: 326 cu/ft. per sec.

The Maple River is a river in the United States. It flows through western Iowa and is 100 miles (160 km) long. The Maple River rises in Buena Vista County, and flows generally southwest through Ida Grove, Battle Creek, Danbury, and Mapleton finally joining with the Little Sioux River near Turin. Much of the river has been channelized.

The Maple River was named from the soft maple trees along its banks.

== See also ==
- List of Iowa rivers
