= Rock Creek (Wapsipinicon River tributary) =

River in Iowa, U.S

Coordinates: 41°46′47″N 90°48′11″W

Rock Creek is a river in U.S. state of Iowa. It is a tributary of the Wapsipinicon River.

Rock Creek takes its name from the ancient rock it contains.

== See also ==
- List of rivers of Iowa
