= Gertrude Stanton =

Dr. Gertrude Stanton
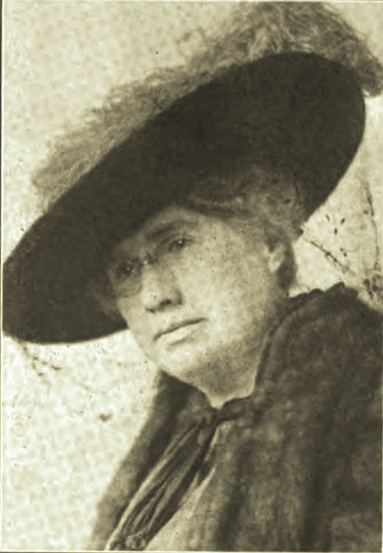
- Stanton in 1924
- Born: Ella Gertrude Smith; 1863; Lime Springs, Iowa, U.S.
- Died: March 25, 1931 (aged 67–68); Altadena, California, U.S.
- Education: Northern Illinois College of Otology and Ophthalmology
- Occupation: Optometrist
- Known for: First woman in the world to be licensed to practice optometry
- Spouses: Roswell Eugene Ayer; Charles M. Stanton; Joseph H. Jones
- Medical career
- Institutions: Dayton's

Gertrude Stanton (née, Smith; after first marriage, Ayer; after second marriage, Stanton; after third marriage, Jones; 1863-1931) was an American optometrist from Iowa who was the first woman in the world to be licensed to practice optometry. She studied at the Northern Illinois College of Otology and Ophthalmology in Chicago, graduating in the 1890s, and established a long career in Minnesota, where she practiced for several decades. Stanton held leadership roles in professional and civic organizations, including serving as vice president of the National Association of Optometrists. During World War I, she assisted the U.S. government by testing soldiers' eyesight, and later employed her daughter in what became the first woman-owned optometry practice in the United States.

== Early life and education ==
Ella Gertrude Smith was born in Lime Springs, Iowa. Her parents were John Taylor Smith and Lucy Olmstead Smith. Gertrude had two sisters.

She studied at Northern Illinois College of Otology and Ophthalmology in Chicago, graduating in 1893, and earned a Bachelor's Degree in 1894, under Dr. Earl J. Brown of Chicago. She also took special courses from Prof. Rogers and studied under the direction of Dr. Charles Sheard.

== Career ==
She practised in small Minnesota towns for ten years and in 1903, established her offices with Dayton's, of Minneapolis, where she remained for twenty years. Stanton later moved her offices to a new location where she employed her daughter, Dr. Sadie Amesbury Betzer, to manage the first woman-owned optometry practice in the U.S.

During World War I, Stanton won recognition from the government for testing eyes of the soldiers.

In 1923, in Minneapolis, she removed her office from Dayton's to the 301 Wilmac building.

Stanton served as the President of the Alumni Association of the Northern Illinois College. She was a charter member and first president of the Woman's Rotary Club, Minneapolis; and vice president of the National Association of Optometrists (1919-1920). She was a member of the Order of the Eastern Star, Business and Professional Women's club; and president of the Zuhrah Ladies Madrigal Club (1930).

== Personal life ==
She was married three times: first, to Mr. Ayer, second, to Mr. Stanton, and third, to Mr. Jones.

Gertrude Stanton died in Altadena, California, on March 25, 1931.

== Awards and recognition ==
A contest to decide the most popular person in seven states conducted by the Minnesota Star Tribune was won by Stanton.
