= Little Maquoketa River =

River in Iowa, United States

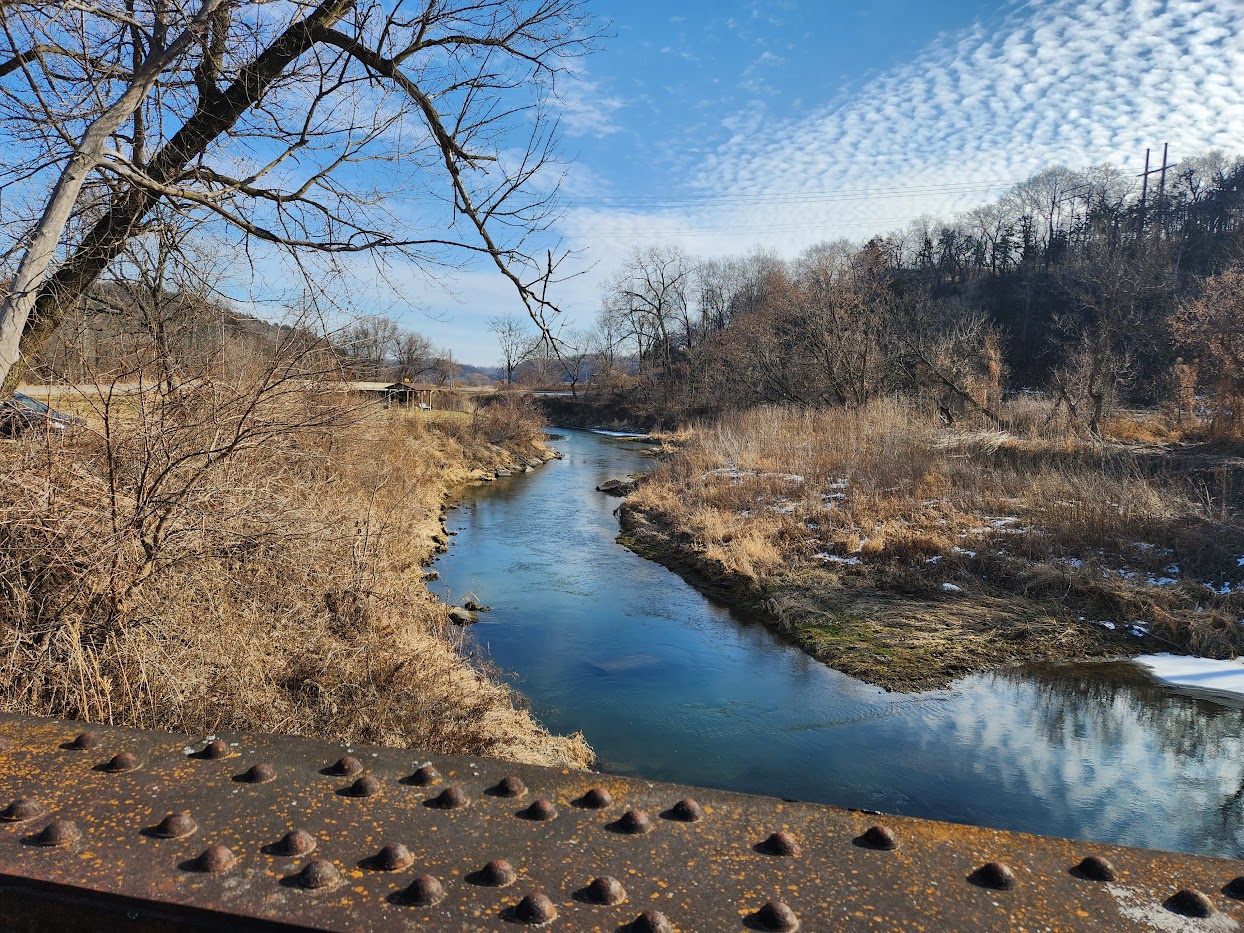
- The Little Maquoketa River from a bridge near Durango.

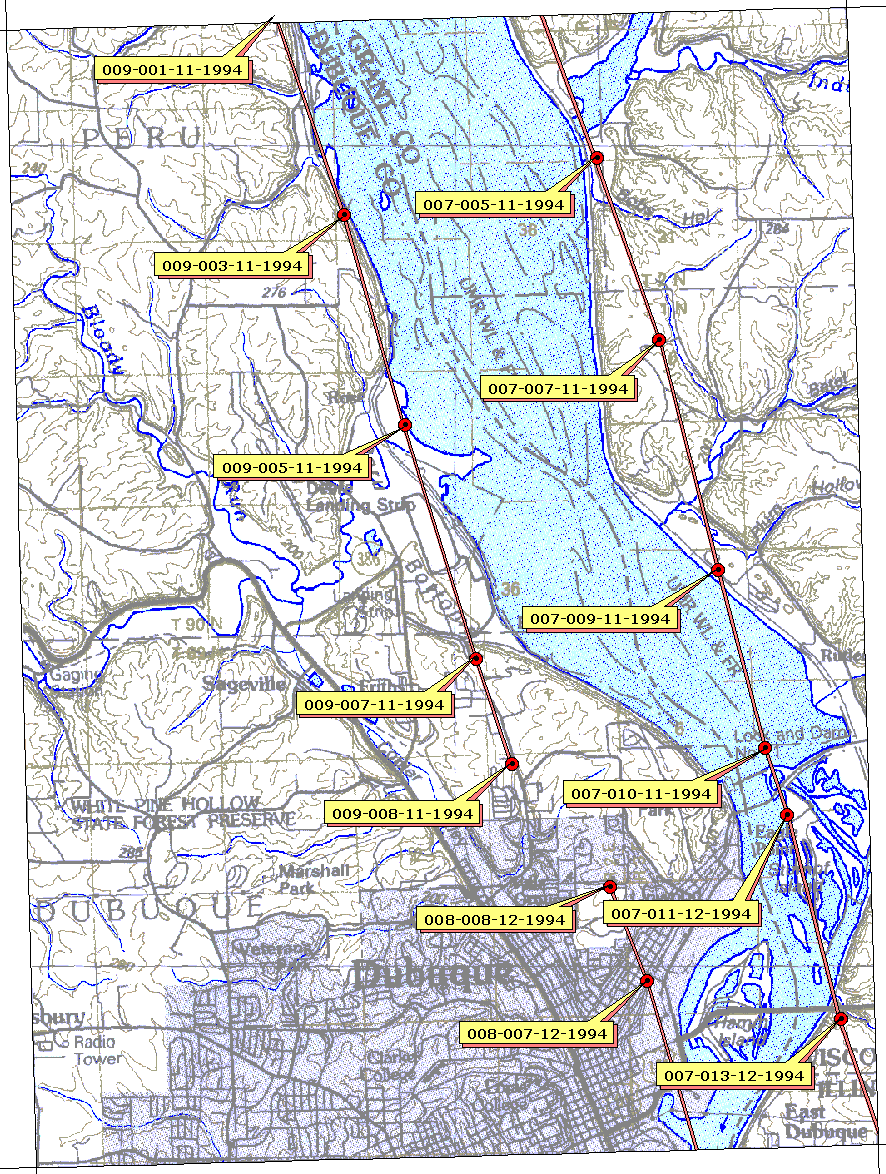
- Little Maquoketa River

Location
- Country: US
- State: Iowa
- District: Dubuque County, Iowa

Physical characteristics
- Source
  - coordinates: 42°29′46″N 90°59′49″W
- Mouth: Mississippi River
  - coordinates: 42°34′37″N 90°40′52″W
  - elevation: 604 ft (184 m)

The Little Maquoketa River (/məˈkoʊkɪtə/) is a 29.6-mile-long (47.6 km) direct tributary of the upper Mississippi River. The Little Maquoketa River is largely confined to Dubuque County, Iowa, and enters the Mississippi in the rural areas north of Dubuque.

It may have previously flowed through the Couler Valley.

== Fishing ==
Little Maquoketa River is a put and grow stream for trout, including brown trout. Three inch fingerlings are stocked each year and they reach 9 to 10 inches the first year, 12 to 14 inches the second year and continue to grow from that point on. The river is considered one of the best smallmouth bass and trout fisheries in Iowa.

== See also ==
- List of rivers of Iowa
  - Bee Branch Creek – The river to the south
  - Cloie Branch – Tributary of the Little Maquoketa
- Little Maquoketa River Mounds State Preserve
