= Lime Creek (Winnebago River tributary) =

- Mouth of Lime Creek

Location
- Country: United States
- State: Iowa, Minnesota
- County: Freeborn County, Minnesota, Winnebago County, Iowa

Physical characteristics
- Source
  - location: Emmons, Minnesota
  - coordinates: 43.5313437°N 93.4941014°W
- Mouth
  - location: Pilot Knob State Park
  - coordinates: 43.3668994°N 93.6202155°W
- Length: 19.8-mile-long (31.9 km)

Basin features
- River system: Mississippi River

Lime Creek is a 19.8-mile-long (31.9 km) tributary of the Winnebago River in Minnesota and Iowa. Via the Winnebago, Shell Rock, Cedar, and Iowa rivers, it is part of the Mississippi River watershed.

== See also ==
- List of rivers of Iowa
- List of rivers of Minnesota
