= Competine Creek (Des Moines River tributary) =

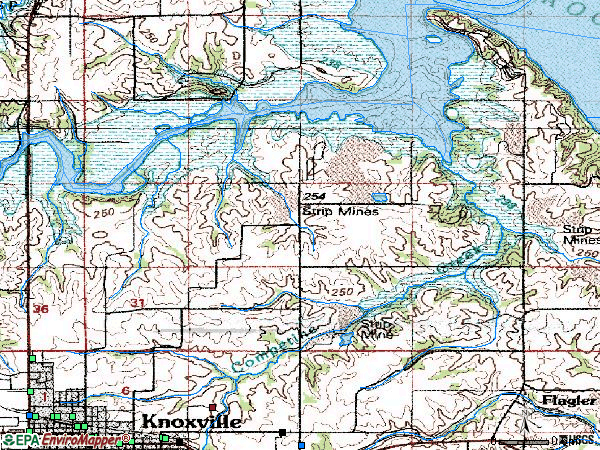
- Competine Creek (Des Moines River) (United States Environmental Protection Agency)

Location
- Country: US
- State: Iowa
- District: Marion County, Iowa

Physical characteristics
- Mouth: Des Moines River
  - coordinates: 41.3677°N 93.0383°W

Competine Creek is a 9.8-mile-long (15.8 km) tributary of the Des Moines River, joining it at Lake Red Rock. It rises to the southwest of Knoxville in Marion County, Iowa.

== See also ==
- List of rivers of Iowa
