= Mill Creek (Jackson County, Iowa) =

Creek in Jackson County, Iowa

Location
- Country: United States
- State: Iowa
- County: Jackson County
- Municipality: Bellevue

Physical characteristics
- Mouth
  - coordinates: 42°15′03″N 90°25′04″W
- Length: 0.3 miles (0.48 km)

Mill Creek is a minor tributary of the Upper Mississippi River in Jackson County, Iowa, United States, entering the Mississippi just south of the city of Bellevue.

The stream is 0.3 miles (0.48 km) long. The creek is accessible from the Big Mill Creek Wildlife Area, which includes a mile of trout stream, Little Mill Wildlife Area, and in Felderman Park.

== History ==
A section of the stream in Felderman Park was updated in 2021 to improve access for fishermen.

== See also ==
- List of rivers of Iowa
- Potter's Mill
