= Granger, Minnesota =

Unincorporated community in Minnesota, United States

Granger
- Unincorporated community
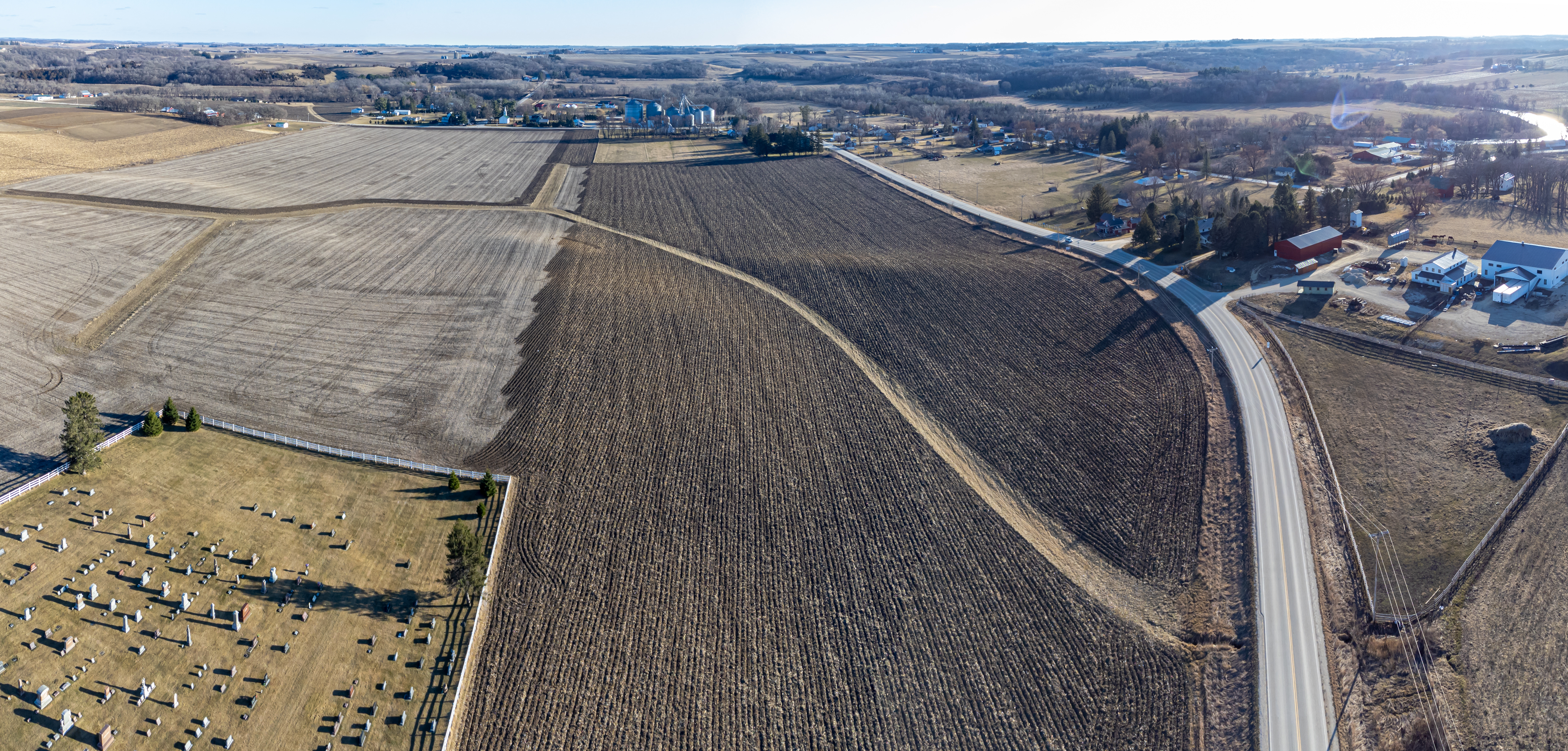
- Granger, MN & Florenceville, IA boarder each other

- Location within Minnesota Location within the United States
- Coordinates: 43°30′08″N 92°08′20″W
- Country: United States
- State: Minnesota
- County: Fillmore
- Township: Bristol Township
- Elevation: 1,148 ft (350 m)
- Time zone: UTC-6 (Central (CST))
  - Summer (DST): UTC-5 (CDT)
- Area code: 507
- GNIS feature ID: 644345

Granger is an unincorporated community in Bristol Township, Fillmore County, Minnesota, United States.

== History ==
Granger was platted in 1857. A post office was established at Granger in 1857, and remained in operation until 1992. The community was named after Brown L. Granger, an early postmaster.

Historical population
Census	Pop.	Note	%±
1880	111		—
U.S. Decennial Census

== See also ==
- Florenceville, Iowa - Granger is on the border next to Florenceville, Iowa
