= Cloie Branch =

Cloie Branch Cloie Creek
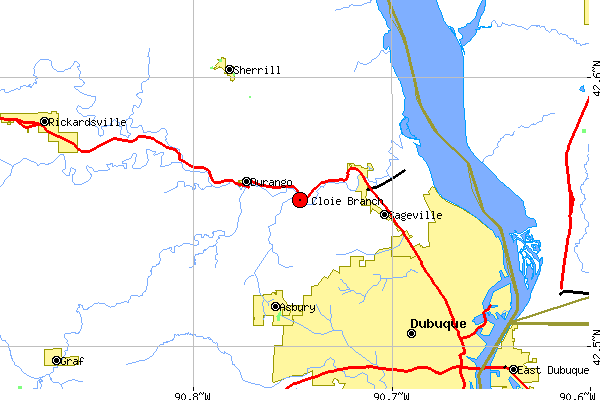
- Cloie Branch (the red dot indicates the confluence between the creek and the Little Maquoketa River) (USGS)

Location
- Country: US
- State: Iowa
- District: Dubuque County, Iowa

Physical characteristics
- Source
  - coordinates: 42.5069°N 90.7693°W
- Mouth: Little Maquoketa River
  - coordinates: 42.5541°N 90.7462°W
  - elevation: 617 ft (188 m)

Cloie Branch (sometimes referred to as Cloie Creek) is a 5.4-mile-long (8.7 km) tributary of the Little Maquoketa River, rising in the northern part of the city of Asbury, in Dubuque County, Iowa.

Burgeoning suburban development in the city of Asbury has encroached the upper reaches of the system. The northern end of the system is rural. Asbury's sewer outfall drains into the creek and mechanical failures have in the past lead to the discharge of only partially treated sewage.

== See also ==
- List of rivers of Iowa
