= Rutt Branch =

Stream in Iowa, U.S.

The Rutt Branch of the West Fork of the Middle Nodaway River is a stream in Adair County, Iowa. It confluence is located at 41°17′27″N 94°37′44″W. It is 10.4 miles (16.7 km) long.

In the Adair County plat book, Rutt Branch is erroneously spelled "Ruit" Branch. It flows mainly through the northeastern part of Jackson township and northwestern part of Summerset township, as well as into Prussia township.

== See also ==
- Tributaries of the Middle Nodaway River
- List of rivers of Iowa
