= Bee Branch Creek =

Creek in Dubuque, Iowa

Bee Branch Creek Couler Creek
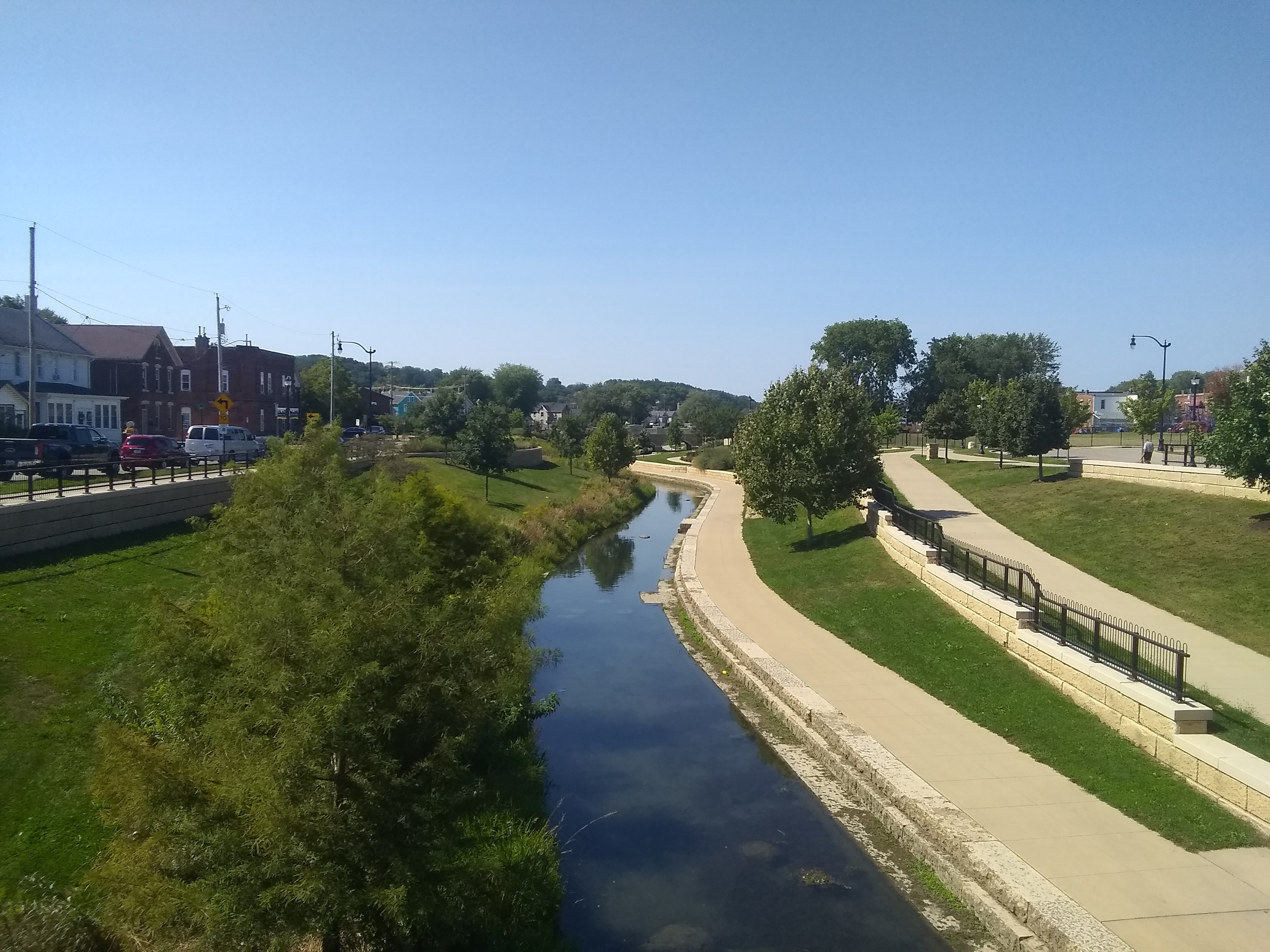
- View of the Upper Bee Branch from the Rhomberg Bridge
- Etymology: Unknown

Location
- Country: United States
- State: Iowa
- City: Dubuque

Physical characteristics
- Source: Suburban Dubuque
  - coordinates: 42°31′26″N 90°43′30″W
- Mouth: Mississippi River (16th Street Basin)
  - coordinates: 42°30′36″N 90°39′10″W
- Length: 5 miles
- Basin size: 6.5 sqmi.
- Width
  - minimum: 15 ft.
  - maximum: 25 ft.
- Depth
  - minimum: 1 1/2 ft.
  - maximum: 3 ft.

Basin features
- River system: Mississippi
- Waterbodies: 16th Street Basin 32nd Street Detention Basin Carter Street Detention Basin

The Bee Branch Creek, formerly known as Couler Creek, is a tributary of the Mississippi River found in Dubuque, Iowa. The creek starts in the west of Dubuque before flowing into the Couler Valley and then into the downtown, flowing through multiple detention basins along the way. Due to the creek's involvement in many disasters, particularly floods, the Bee Branch Creek has become an interest for Dubuque.

After restoration projects, the creek has become a daylighted stream with parks and trails along its banks. It has been estimated to have prevented millions of dollars in damages. The Bee Branch has also been involved with numerous ecological projects. Recently daylighted, the Iowa Department of Natural Resources (DNR) diagnosed the creek with a healthy ecosystem.

== Etymology ==
It is unknown how the Bee Branch got its name; however, it is believed to be a name for a lower tributary of the creek. Earlier, the creek went by Couler Creek, named after Couler Valley and Couler Village. Couler could come from the French couler or "to cast", coming from the local smelting of lead. The name Bee Branch was in use by 1863, although the name existed before then. Also, Couler Creek remained in use for a long time afterward, being used in 1959 and 1997 geological surveys.

== History ==
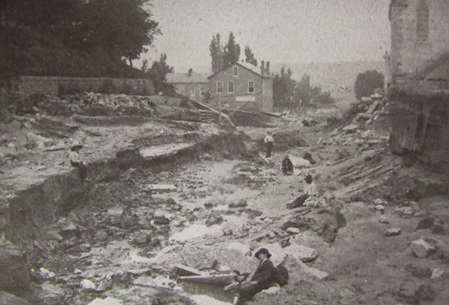
Results from flooding along W. 17th St. in 1876

=== Early history ===
The Couler Creek saw many floods, inhibiting growth in the city in the 19th century. In 1877, a plan to alter the course of the Bee Branch north to the Little Maquoketa River was made. After a flood in 1878, opinion was swayed into directing the Bee Branch into the Little Maquoketa. In 1885, the Dubuque and Northwestern Railroad acquired right of way along Elm Street and the Bee Branch, leading to an increase of development. Residential development also increased in the Couler Valley as sewers and streetcars were put in. In June 1892, a flood affected much of eastern Iowa; the areas along the Couler Creek were described as the worst affected by the Quad-City Times. Another flood in March 1894 brought more calls for the northward diversion. A petition was prepared and, at the time, it was expected to pass unanimously.

The chosen idea in the end was putting the creek through a sewer. An advantage of the storm sewer would allow for Elm Street to be expanded. In late 1898, the city council hired J. H. Blake to plan out the sewer. The Chicago, Milwaukee & St. Paul Railway aided in the construction of the sewer as their yards straddled the creek. In 1902, the Chicago Great Western Railway attempted to impede the construction of the sewer, requesting a heavier sewer system under its tracks. Due to the franchise being up for the renewal, the attempt from the railway failed. An ordinance was made and was finalized, putting the sewer under Elm Street, allowing for the railroads second line, and pledged the city to build the line further north. The railroad would build the Elm Street Sewer and the pledged work would be finished by the latter part of 1905.

The sewer was critically acclaimed by the Dubuque Enterprise newspaper due to a sewer allowing for the north to be developed as the Bee Branch had blocked off the north end of the city. The upstream portions remained open until 1915 and some parts of the creek were not closed until 1920. By the mid 20th century, the creek was seen as insignificant.

=== Bee Branch Watershed Project ===
The year 1999 saw a storm that precipitated 5.6 inches (140 mm) of rainfall. That flood prompted the city to research an engineering project on the 100-year flood area. The year of 1999, along with 2002, 2004, 2008, 2010, and 2011, collectively saw devastating floods, prompting six presidential disaster declarations with estimated costs around $70 million. The city reacting to this, started the Bee Branch Watershed Project.

The Bee Branch Watershed Flood Mitigation Project is a multi-phased project aimed at reducing flash flooding, improving water quality, and improving the quality of life in the creek's watershed. The Bee Branch is one of eight watersheds under the Iowa Watershed Approach. The Iowa Department of Homeland Security and Emergency Management (Iowa HSEMD) lists twelve phases.

The Lower Bee Branch Creek Restoration Project is phase four. It includes a large pond and a few overlooks in an old industrial park. The Upper Bee Branch Creek Restoration is phase seven. It is also known as the Greenway. The Greenway is designed to direct stormwater into the creek.

It was found that the storm sewer did not have the capacity for storms of that size. Detention basins were added or improved on to limit flooding. The Bee Branch storm sewer was daylighted into the Bee Branch Creek, not only as a flood prevention system but also as a community asset and to replace the lost ecosystem. The creek is more open than its previous sewer design, allowing a greater volume of water to be carried.

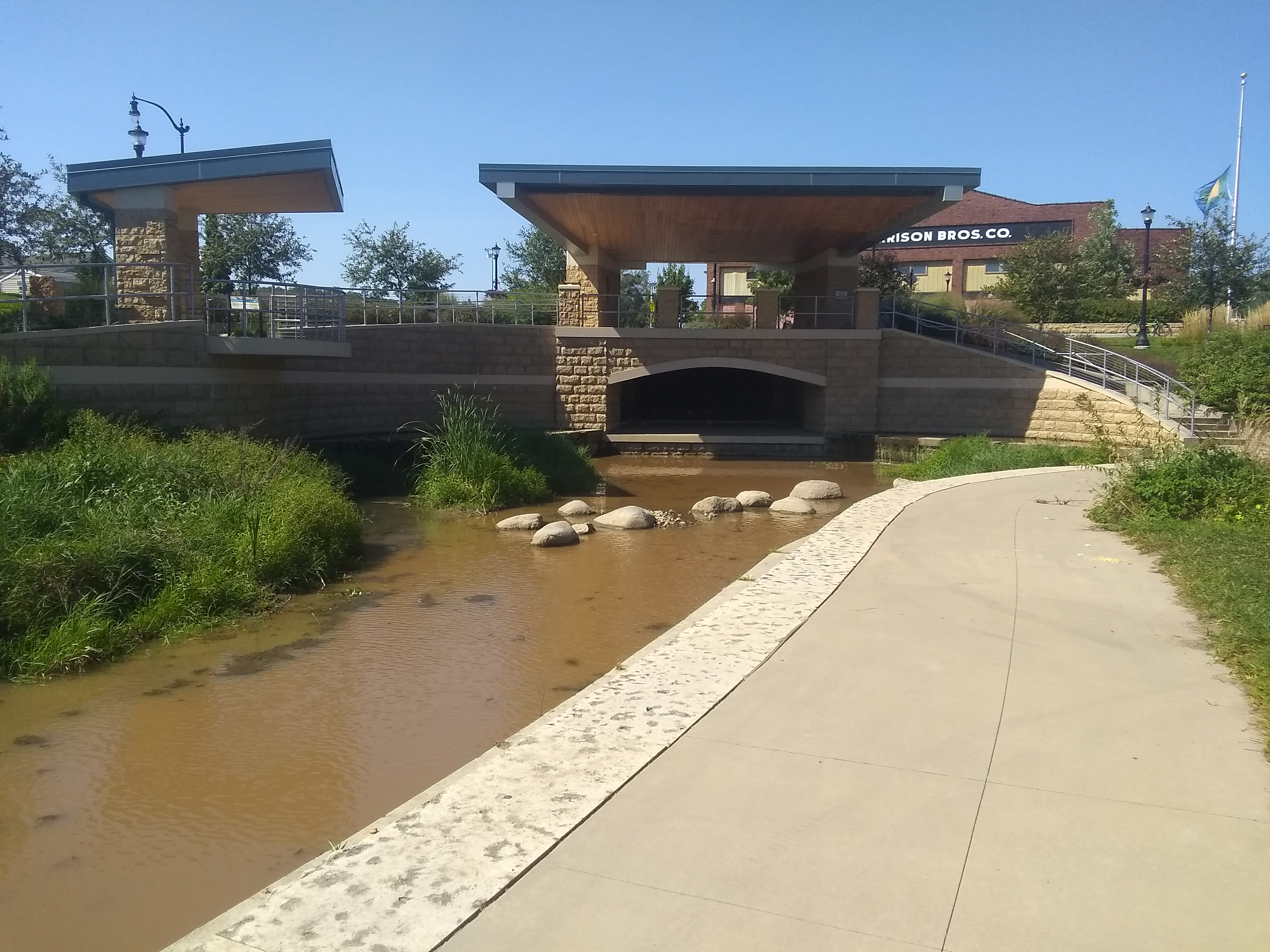
Entrance to the remaining sections of the sewer.

Throughout the 2000s, the project was being planned including with citizen hearings in 2003, acquisitions of the affected properties in 2005, and designing in 2008. The project did receive backlash. Citizens were unhappy that homes were getting demolished and they felt that they were not getting compensated enough. Citizens also worried the daylighted creek would be ugly or unsafe or raise utility bills.

In 2010, the Lower Bee Branch Restoration was started and it ended by June 2015. Construction on the Upper Bee Branch Restoration started in 2015 and was completed December 2016. About 100 pieces of property were bought by the city. Six houses, a parking lot, and 9,400,000 cubic feet (270,000 m^{3}) of soil were removed to make space for the creek. The storm sewer was also expanded, with the town adding trench drains. The renovations closed W. 17th Street for about a month and a half, from May 3 to June 22, 2021. The city also tried to minimize impermeable surfaces causing flooding by converting alleyways into permeable sections. The conversion is expected to cost $9.5 million and be completed in December 2033.

From 2009 to the mid-2010s, the Bee Branch underwent an archaeological survey. This was required due to its eligibility to be on the National Register of Historic Places. Many artifacts from the late 19th to early 20th centuries were found, including: buttons, bottles, ceramics, and smoking pipes. The data from the survey can tell about the habits of the people who used to live there, which could also be used to determine ethnicities of the area.

In 2017, the Bee Branch adverted a flood when 4.9 inches (12 cm) of rain fell. Two more floods were prevented in 2018 and 2019.

On June 18, 2020, Gavilon Grain spilled two containers with a million gallons of liquid nitrogen fertilizer into the Bee Branch. An estimated 432,000 U.S. gallons (1,640,000 L) of fertilizer was spilled into a storm drain that flows into the Bee Branch. The accident was caused by a mistake transferring nitrogen, with the receiving tank overfilling. The transfer was not being watched nor was the spill immediately reported. This severely damaged the mussel population, causing the largest mussel kill in the state and killed numerous fish. They died to the high concentrations of ammonia. A second killing happened as the leftover fertilizer was washed back into the Bee Branch. The company was fined $270,000. The largest fine of $244,705 was issued to restore giant floater and plain pocketbook mussels. Gavilon also agreed to pay $18,828 for fish restoration. An administrative penalty of $7,000 was issued by the DNR, which is lower than is required to be issued under Iowa law.

By October 2021, the city had finished building culverts under the Canadian Pacific Railway (CPR) to route the creek through. A walkway was finished by 2022. It was opened on June 24. This event was commemorated as the finishing the restoration project. However, the Bee Branch Watershed Project is not expected to be completed until 2040. In November 2022, a $3 million project to make a new drainage sewer to replace the temporary siphon sewer. The siphon system had maintenance issues according to a worker. The city was unable to put in the replacement earlier due to a lack of finances. In 2025, a pump from the University of Iowa was installed in the Bee Branch, costing $26 million. Work was halted in October on installation over fears of contamination related to the 2020 chemical spill.

State and federal contributions have made up the bulk of the funding, with contributions from the city and the Iowa Flood Mitigation Program.

As of 2024, the project has costed $250 million, mostly cover by $163 million in grants from the state and federal levels.

==== Outcome ====
The Bee Branch after the restoration has been proven to manage flash flooding. However, without all the phases completed, water will move out slower. Over 1,100 properties were protected as a result of the restoration. Overall, the project has prevented $11.6 million in damages.

The Bee Branch received publicization in the likes of The Atlantic, Scientific American, and U.S. News & World Report. The project also inspired Middletown, Pennsylvania, who was also struggling with floods. Also, the project was used to resist the Blacksnake Combined Sewer Overflow project. Protesters against the project cited Bee Branch as what the Blacksnake Creek could become. However, supporters said Blacksnake Creek was very different.

== Geography ==
The creek originates in the suburbia, just past Eisenhower Elementary, then flows into the Carter Street Detention Basin and 32nd Street Detention Basin in the Couler Valley. The Upper Bee Branch comes from the old sewer and feeds the Lower Bee Branch. The culvert that feeds the Upper Bee Branch comes from those detention basins deeper in town. The Bee Branch is split into two sections by the CPR and Garfield Avenue. The Lower Bee Branch goes out into the Mississippi. In total, the drainage basin covers about 6.5 square miles (17 km^{2}) and 50% of Dubuque's businesses and population. The creek is about 5 miles (8.0 km) long.

The geography of the north end of Dubuque, specifically its steepness, makes it more likely for floods to happen. This is made more extreme due to Dubuque covering permeable surfaces with asphalt.

=== Crossings ===
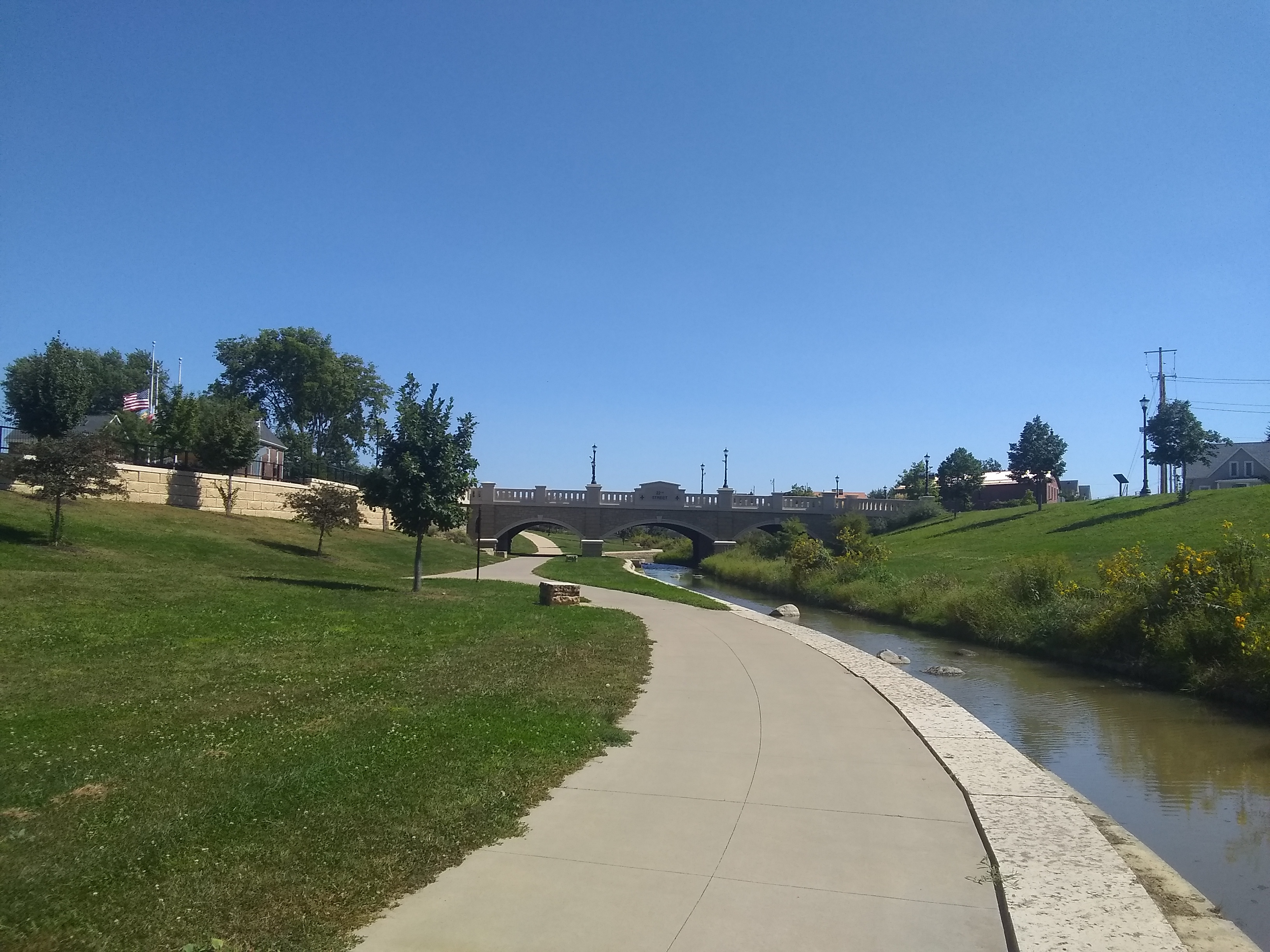
22nd Street Bridge, an example of the style of bridge crossing the creek.

The Bee Branch is crossed by 22nd Street and Rhomberg in the upper part and Sycamore Street and 16th Street in the lower section and Garfield and the CPR separates the upper and lower sections. Dubuque commissioned Origin Design to plan and build up the bridges of the upper and lower sections.

=== Bee Branch Creek Greenway ===
The Bee Branch Creek Greenway is a large, linear park along the Upper Bee Branch. It is 1,938 feet (591 m) long. The greenway includes a playground, an amphitheater, a garden, a bioswale, benches, lighting, and rest areas. The Bee Branch's trail is 1.56 miles (2.51 km) long and is paved with asphalt and concrete. The trail is made up of two overlapping loops, both 0.82 miles (1.32 km) long. The trails also go under the nearby rails through a pedestrian tunnel.

== Ecology ==
It is expected that the creek will maintain a healthy ecosystem. In the Lower Bee Branch, 14 native species of fish and the common carp have been found in it. Many of these fish are game fish, including: bluegill, largemouth bass, and northern pike. The Iowa DNR considered the ecosystem healthy considering the how new the stream is.

=== Floating islands ===
In July 2017, the city of Dubuque installed 14 floating islands in the creek between 16th Street and the US Route 151/61 overpass. The islands provide habitats and pull excess nutrients out of the water, like phosphorus, nitrogen, and floating sediments. The rafts are made from recycled BPA-free polyethylene terephthalate plastic, which is also used in plastic bottles. The islands have a total area of 2,674 square feet (248.4 m^{2}). The largest islands are 44 feet (13 m) by 17 feet (5.2 m).

The islands have multiple layers that provide various habitats. For example, a top layer for pollinators and animals that sit on the rafts or a lower layer for fish to eat off the roots. Due to having native plants, the islands will not have to be removed during winter. Some types of plants on the islands include: sedges, blue flag iris, marsh marigold. The plants anchoring the islands to the ground means that the islands can change with water levels.

=== Mussels ===
On June 11, 2020, 2,500 freshwater mussels, given by the United States Fish and Wildlife Service, were released into the Bee Branch. The plan was that the mussels would be used to clean up the water. In past years, the Iowa DNR have been making an effort to return mussel populations to waterways. The mussels were split into two groups. The 1st group would be placed in rearing silos. The 2nd group would be released in groups of 500 throughout the creek.

== See also ==
- Dubuque Arboretum and Botanical Gardens – A park in the North End
- Eagle Point Park – Another park in the North End
- History of Dubuque, Iowa
- Lock and Dam No. 11
- Rivers of Iowa
  - Catfish Creek – A creek to the south of the Bee Branch
