= Lidtke Mill =

Historic house in Iowa, United States

- Lime Springs Mill Complex
- U.S. National Register of Historic Places
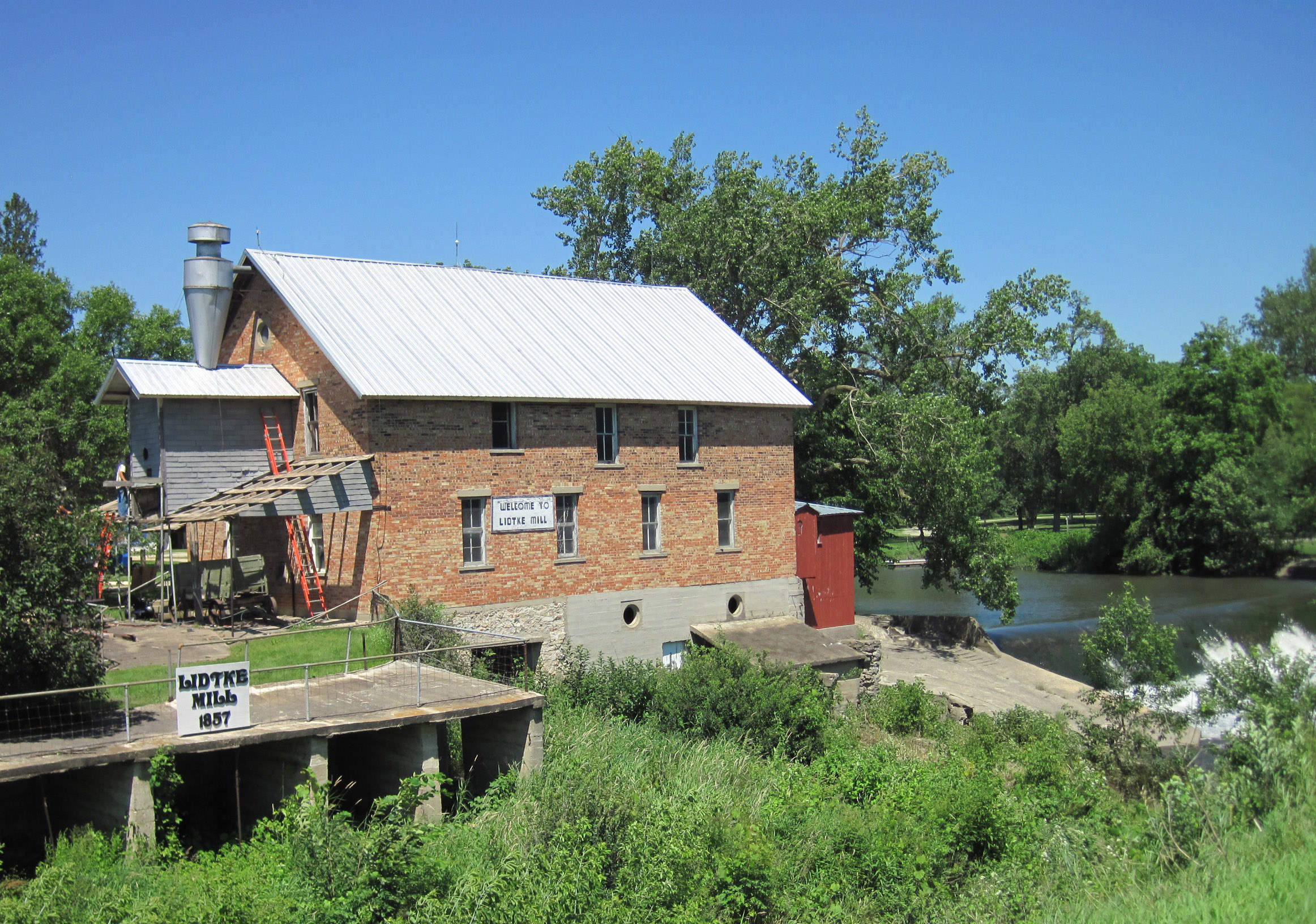

- Location within Iowa Location within the United States
- Location: SR 157; Lime Springs, Iowa
- Coordinates: 43°27′54″N 92°16′45″W
- Area: 2 acres (0.81 ha)
- Built: 1857
- NRHP reference No.: 77000518
- Added to NRHP: April 11, 1977

Lidtke Mill, also known as the Lime Springs Mill Complex, is a historic building located on the Upper Iowa River located in the "Old Town" area of Lime Springs, Iowa, United States. It is part of the 10 acres (4.0 ha) Lidtke Park.

== Description and history ==
The mill is an L-shaped structure is composed of limestone covered with a yellow brick veneer. The main section was completed in 1857 and rebuilt after a fire in 1894. At one time, it not only milled grains but also provided hydroelectric power to surrounding communities. The footprints of a worker nearly electrocuted there can still be seen in the floor of the control room. The miller's house is a frame structure that follows a rectangular plan. The original section of the building was built in 1857. Wings on the west and east sides were added around 1880. The cement block section on the north side was added in 1927. The mill complex is now open as a museum. From time to time, events such as the Buckwheat Festival are held at the site. The mill and the miller's house were listed together on the National Register of Historic Places in 1977.
