= Canoe Creek (Upper Iowa River tributary) =

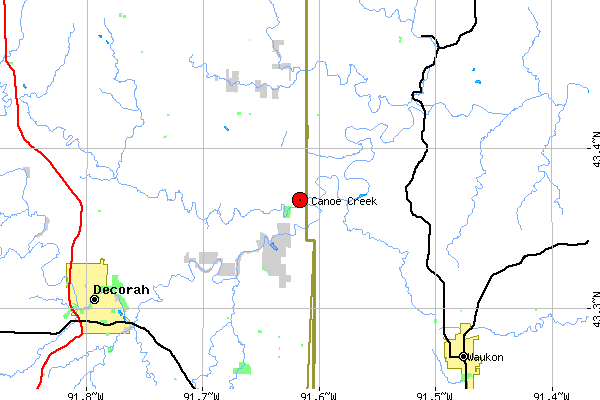
- Canoe Creek (the red dot indicates the confluence between the creek and the river) (EPA)

Location
- Country: US
- State: Iowa
- District: Winneshiek County, Iowa, Fillmore County, Minnesota

Physical characteristics
- Source
  - coordinates: 43.5049°N 91.8485°W
- Mouth: Upper Iowa River
  - coordinates: 43.3675°N 91.6168°W
  - elevation: 738 ft (225 m)

Canoe Creek is a 33.2-mile-long (53.4 km) tributary of the Upper Iowa River. It rises in Burr Oak Township in Winneshiek County, Iowa. North Canoe Creek rises in Hesper Township, meeting the main stream in Canoe Township. Canoe Creek continues through Pleasant Township to enter the Upper Iowa just into Allamakee County in Hanover Township, in the state-maintained Canoe Creek Wildlife Management Area.

== See also ==
- List of rivers of Iowa

== Sources ==
- Iowa Department of Natural Resources(retrieved 2 April 2007)
- Iowa Natural Heritage (retrieved 2 April 2007)
- Environmental Protection Agency (retrieved 2 April 2007)
- Burr Oak Township (retrieved 2 April 2007)
- Hesper Township (retrieved 2 April 2007)
- Canoe Township (retrieved 2 April 2007)
- Hanover Township (retrieved 2 April 2007)
- Pleasant Township (retrieved 2 April 2007
