= Cedar Creek (Skunk River tributary) =

Location
- Country: United States
- State: Iowa

Physical characteristics
- Source
  - location: Approximately five miles southeast of Oskaloosa, Iowa
  - coordinates: 41°14′00″N 92°33′47″W
  - elevation: Approximately 815 feet
- Mouth: Skunk River
  - coordinates: 40°52′26″N 91°43′11″W
  - elevation: 570 feet

Basin features
- River system: Skunk River

Cedar Creek, located in southeast Iowa, USA, is a tributary of the Skunk River. Via the Skunk River it is part of the Mississippi River watershed. Cedar Creek rises in rural Mahaska County approximately one mile west of the unincorporated community of Cedar. It passes through Wapello, Jefferson, Van Buren, and Henry counties, passing by Fairfield before joining the Skunk River near the intersection of U.S. Route 34 and Clayton Avenue, about a half mile south of Rome.

== Tributaries ==
- (left) Wolf Creek
- (left) Berry Branch
- (right) Little Cedar Creek
  - (left) Mud Creek
- (right) Rock Creek
- (right) Summer Creek
- (left) Rock Creek
  - (left) Jones Branch
- (left) Troy Creek
- (left) Crow Creek
- (left) Mitchell Creek
- (left) Church Creek
- (right) Grubb Run
- (left) Hupp Creek
- (right) Bonell Creek
- (right) Rock Creek
- (left) Competine Creek
  - (left) Coon Creek
  - (left) Little Competine Creek
- (right) Honey Creek
- (right) Buckeye Creek
- (right) Jordan Creek
- (left) Wolf Creek
- (right) Little Cedar Creek
- (left) Spring Creek
  - (left) Spring Branch

== See also ==
- List of rivers of Iowa
