= Couler Valley =

Valley in Iowa, United States

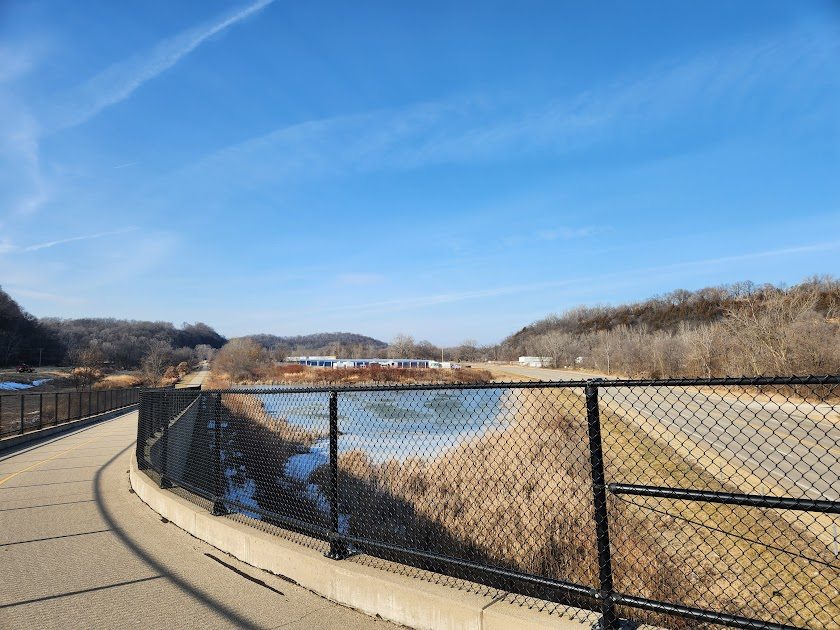
- The Couler Valley as seen from a bridge on the Heritage Trail over Iowa Highway 3
- Length: 5 miles (8.0 km)
- Width: 0.5 miles (0.80 km)
- Depth: 200 feet (61 m)

Geography
- Country: United States
- State: Iowa
- Region: Dubuque County
- Coordinates: 42°33′35″N 90°42′33″W
- Rivers: Bee Branch Creek, Little Maquoketa River
- Interactive map of Couler Valley

The Couler Valley is a valley near Dubuque, Iowa, and has the Bee Branch Creek, previously known as the Couler Creek, located in it. It is about 5 miles (8.0 km) long. It is found in the Driftless Area.

== Etymology ==
The name Couler has unknown meanings, however it could originate from the French couler or "to cast." Previously, the lower section went by Langworthy Hollow.

== History ==
It has been interpreted that the Little Maquoketa River used to flow through the Couler Valley.

Mining started in the valley in 1788 when Julien Dubuque befriended the Meskwaki. Most of the Couler Valley was included in the land grant to Dubuque by the Spanish Empire. After Dubuque's death, the Meskwaki took over mining and exported lead to white settlers who had a furnace on a Mississippian Island. In 1833, settling was permitted west of the Mississippi and mining was resumed by settlers.

== Geography ==
The Couler Valley stretches for about 5 miles (8.0 km) in between the valleys of the Little Maquoketa River in Sageville to the Mississippi River in Dubuque in the south. It is drained southeastwardly by the Bee Branch. During high floods, the Little Maquoketa River can also occupy parts of the valley. It is 200 feet (61 m) deep, 0.5 miles (0.80 km) wide, and has a flat alluvial bottom.

== Geology ==
The ore district around the Couler Valley has large amounts of zinc and lead. Those minerals were mined extensively in the 19th century. The lithology of the surface consists of loess and residuum.
