= Tete Des Morts Creek =

Iowan River

Tete Des Morts Creek Tete De Morts
- 1857 illustration by Henry Lewis

Location
- State: Iowa
- County: Dubuque County, Jackson County

Physical characteristics
- Mouth
  - location: 42°22′59″N 90°29′22″W
- Length: ~15 miles

The Tete Des Morts Creek is a stream that flows for 16 miles (26 km) between Dubuque County and Jackson County in Iowa. The only town in the drainage basin is St. Donatus.

The name Tête Des Morts translates from French as "Head of Death".

Julien Dubuque used the area around to get access to the land from the Spanish Empire. His lease from the Sauk and Meskwaki used the Tete Des Morts as a boundary. In modern times, 98% of the watershed was dedicated to agriculture.
