= Perry Creek (Conasauga River tributary) =

River in Georgia, United States

Coordinates: 34°58′45.28″N 84°46′56.78″W

Perry Creek is a stream in the U.S. state of Georgia. It is a tributary to the Conasauga River.

According to tradition, the creek was named after one Sol Perry (or Perez), a settler of Spanish descent. A variant name was "Pears Creek".
