= Spruce Creek (Iowa) =

River in the United States of America

Coordinates: 42.3025135°N 90.4334616°W

Spruce Creek is a very minor tributary of the Upper Mississippi River confined mainly to Tete des Mortes Township in southeastern Dubuque County, Iowa and Bellevue Township in northeastern Jackson County, Iowa, entering the Mississippi a few miles above Bellevue.

Jackson County has a park there.

== See also ==
- List of rivers of Iowa
