= Florenceville, Iowa =

- Unincorporated community
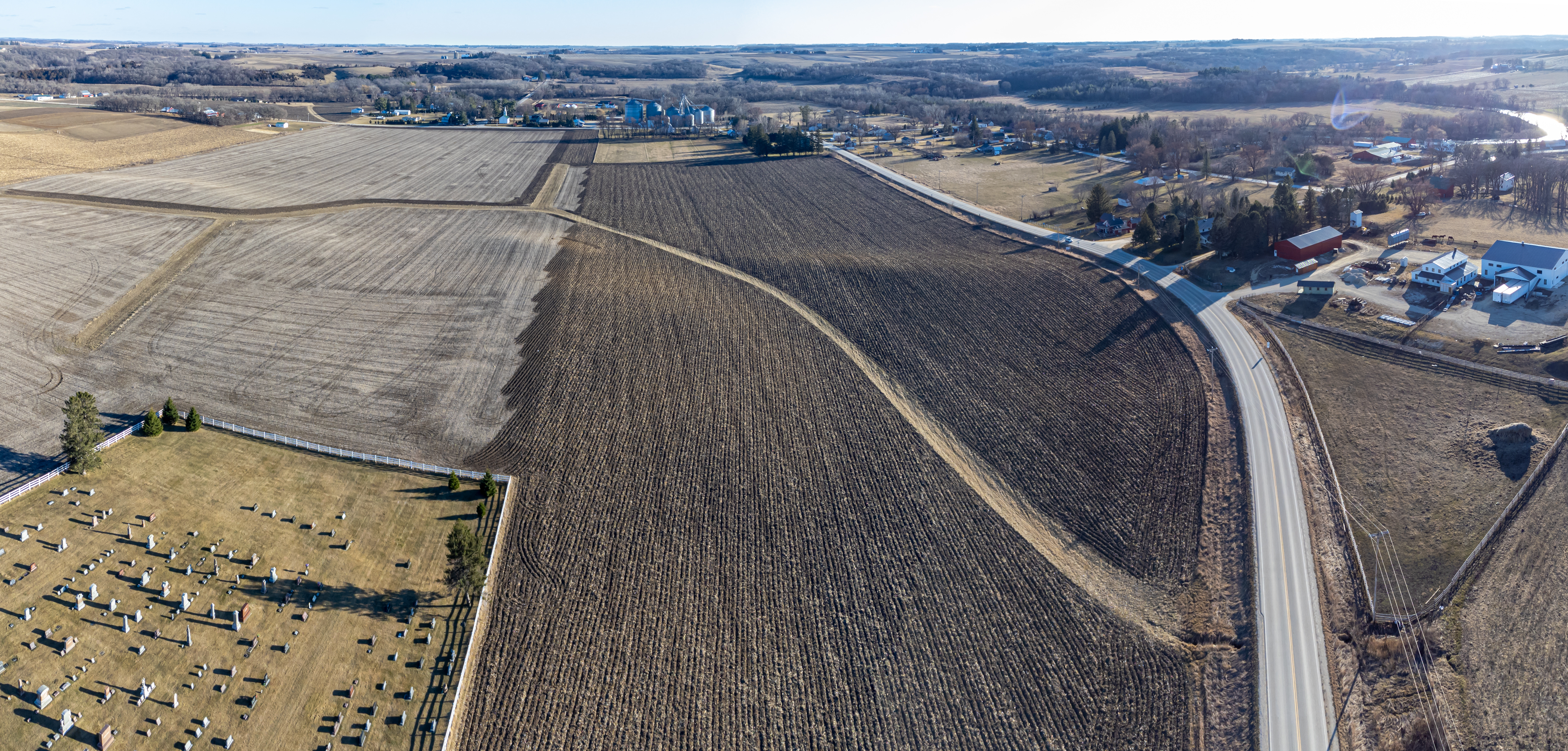
- Floranceville is on the Minnesota boarder next to Granger, MN

- Location within Iowa
- Coordinates: 43°29′57″N 92°07′58″W
- Country: United States
- State: Iowa
- County: Howard
- Elevation: 1,135 ft (346 m)
- Time zone: UTC-6 (Central (CST))
  - Summer (DST): UTC-5 (CDT)
- Area code: 563
- GNIS feature ID: 456643

Florenceville is an unincorporated community located in Howard County, Iowa, United States. It is adjacent to the village of Granger, Minnesota.

== Geography ==
Florenceville is located at 43°29'54" North, 92°7'58" West. Florenceville is in the northwest portion of section 10, Albion Township, Howard County. The Iowa-Minnesota state line forms the village's northern border. The Upper Iowa River runs through the village.

The area features a Karst topography. Niagara Cave, located a few miles northeast of the village, is one of the largest caves in the Midwest.

== History ==
Florenceville, platted as Florence, sprang up in the mid-19th century. A post office operated from 1871 to 1902. The population of the community was 58 in 1902, and just 12 in 1925.

Originally, it had a mill, a post office and a general store. Now, mostly houses remain. The village has a Methodist church that closed in the 1960s. An annual reunion service brings former and current residents back together for a Sunday in the summer. The church building is now owned and maintained by the Howard County Historical Society.

== Tourism and recreation ==
The village features a county park popular for softball games. An Amish community thrives in the area and tours of Amish country are available.
