= Turin, Iowa =

- City
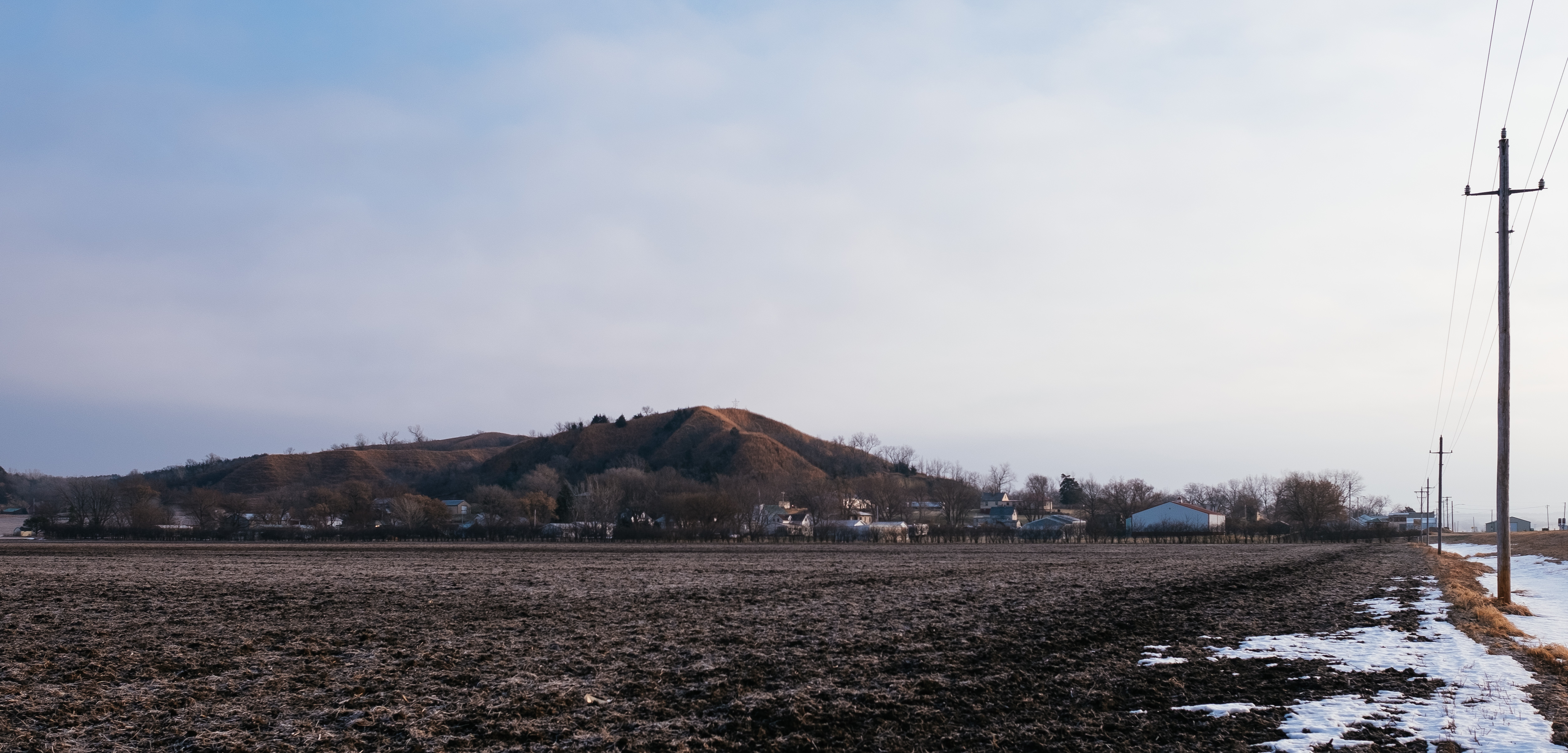
- Turin at the base of the Loess Hills

- Location of Turin, Iowa
- Coordinates: 42°01′15″N 95°57′58″W
- Country: USA
- State: Iowa
- County: Monona

Area
  - Total: 0.089 sq mi (0.23 km^{2})
  - Land: 0.089 sq mi (0.23 km^{2})
  - Water: 0 sq mi (0.00 km^{2})
- Elevation: 1,047 ft (319 m)

Population (2020)
  - Total: 72
  - Density: 801.9/sq mi (309.62/km^{2})
- Time zone: UTC-6 (Central (CST))
  - Summer (DST): UTC-5 (CDT)
- ZIP code: 51059
- Area code: 712
- FIPS code: 19-79185
- GNIS feature ID: 2397068

Turin is a city in Monona County, Iowa, United States. The population was 72 at the time of the 2020 census.

== History ==
Turin was platted in 1887. It was named after Turin, in Italy. A post office was established at Turin in 1887, and remained in operation until it was discontinued in 1996.

== Geography ==
Turin is situated near the confluence of the Little Sioux and Maple rivers.

According to the United States Census Bureau, the city has a total area of 0.09 square miles (0.23 km^{2}), all land.

== Demographics ==
Historical populations
Year	Pop.	±%
1910	154	—
1920	158	+2.6%
1930	167	+5.7%
1940	184	+10.2%
1950	160	−13.0%
1960	163	+1.9%
1970	115	−29.4%
1980	103	−10.4%
1990	95	−7.8%
2000	75	−21.1%
2010	68	−9.3%
2020	72	+5.9%
Source:"U.S. Census website". United States Census Bureau. and Iowa Data Center; Source: U.S. Decennial Census

=== 2020 census ===
As of the census of 2020, there were 72 people, 26 households, and 20 families residing in the city. The population density was 801.9 inhabitants per square mile (309.6/km^{2}). There were 35 housing units at an average density of 389.8 per square mile (150.5/km^{2}). The racial makeup of the city was 98.6% White, 0.0% Black or African American, 0.0% Native American, 0.0% Asian, 0.0% Pacific Islander, 0.0% from other races and 1.4% from two or more races. Hispanic or Latino persons of any race comprised 0.0% of the population.

Of the 26 households, 34.6% of which had children under the age of 18 living with them, 65.4% were married couples living together, 7.7% were cohabitating couples, 3.8% had a female householder with no spouse or partner present and 23.1% had a male householder with no spouse or partner present. 23.1% of all households were non-families. 3.8% of all households were made up of individuals, 0.0% had someone living alone who was 65 years old or older.

The median age in the city was 45.5 years. 25.0% of the residents were under the age of 20; 2.8% were between the ages of 20 and 24; 22.2% were from 25 and 44; 23.6% were from 45 and 64; and 26.4% were 65 years of age or older. The gender makeup of the city was 58.3% male and 41.7% female.

=== 2010 census ===
As of the census of 2010, there were 68 people, 33 households, and 19 families living in the city. The population density was 755.6 inhabitants per square mile (291.7/km^{2}). There were 38 housing units at an average density of 422.2 per square mile (163.0/km^{2}). The racial makeup of the city was 97.1% White and 2.9% African American.

There were 33 households, of which 21.2% had children under the age of 18 living with them, 48.5% were married couples living together, 6.1% had a female householder with no husband present, 3.0% had a male householder with no wife present, and 42.4% were non-families. 33.3% of all households were made up of individuals, and 9.1% had someone living alone who was 65 years of age or older. The average household size was 2.06 and the average family size was 2.68.

The median age in the city was 52.5 years. 19.1% of residents were under the age of 18; 2.9% were between the ages of 18 and 24; 19.1% were from 25 to 44; 29.5% were from 45 to 64; and 29.4% were 65 years of age or older. The gender makeup of the city was 54.4% male and 45.6% female.

=== 2000 census ===
As of the census of 2000, there were 75 people, 34 households, and 24 families living in the city. The population density was 892.4 inhabitants per square mile (344.6/km^{2}). There were 39 housing units at an average density of 464.0 per square mile (179.2/km^{2}). The racial makeup of the city was 98.67% White and 1.33% Native American.

There were 34 households, out of which 20.6% had children under the age of 18 living with them, 55.9% were married couples living together, 11.8% had a female householder with no husband present, and 26.5% were non-families. 20.6% of all households were made up of individuals, and 8.8% had someone living alone who was 65 years of age or older. The average household size was 2.21 and the average family size was 2.52.

In the city, the population was spread out, with 18.7% under the age of 18, 9.3% from 18 to 24, 24.0% from 25 to 44, 30.7% from 45 to 64, and 17.3% who were 65 years of age or older. The median age was 44 years. For every 100 females, there were 92.3 males. For every 100 females age 18 and over, there were 79.4 males.

The median income for a household in the city was $23,750, and the median income for a family was $21,875. Males had a median income of $24,792 versus $16,875 for females. The per capita income for the city was $15,094. There were 21.2% of families and 21.6% of the population living below the poverty line, including 52.6% of under eighteens and none of those over 64.

== Education ==
West Monona Community School District operates public schools serving the community.
