= Perry Run =

Stream in Morgan County, Ohio, U.S.

Coordinates: 39°36′15″N 81°42′54″W

Perry Run is a stream in Morgan County, in the U.S. state of Ohio.

The stream bears the name of William Perry, a pioneer blacksmith.

== See also ==
- List of rivers of Ohio
