= Perry Creek (Missouri River tributary) =

Stream in Iowa, United States of America

Perry Creek is a 28.9-mile-long (46.5 km) tributary of the Missouri River in the state of Iowa. It rises in central Plymouth County and flows generally to the south-by-southwest, crossing the Woodbury County line at the city limits of Sioux City, north of Briar Cliff University and the Sioux City Country Club. At Sixth Street, the creek enters a conduit near, which then takes the flow underground to its mouth at the Missouri on the western edge of the downtown riverfront area. Perry Creek courses through residential neighborhoods, and has been plagued by past flooding; it has recently been at the center of a major federally funded flood control project.

== See also ==
- List of rivers of Iowa
