= Spruce Creek (British Columbia) =

Coordinates: 59°34′59″N 133°38′56″W

Spruce Creek is located in the Atlin Country region of British Columbia. The creek flows into Pine Creek. Fred Marius discovered gold in this creek in 1898. In 1899 two American prospectors named West and Hoffenen found a gold nugget which weighed just over 83 ounces. The nugget was nicknamed "the west". "The west" nugget contained some quartz and thus was not the largest solid gold nugget found in British Columbia. The creek produced over 300,000 fine ounces of gold, valued at $7,000,000.
