= Yellow River (Iowa) =

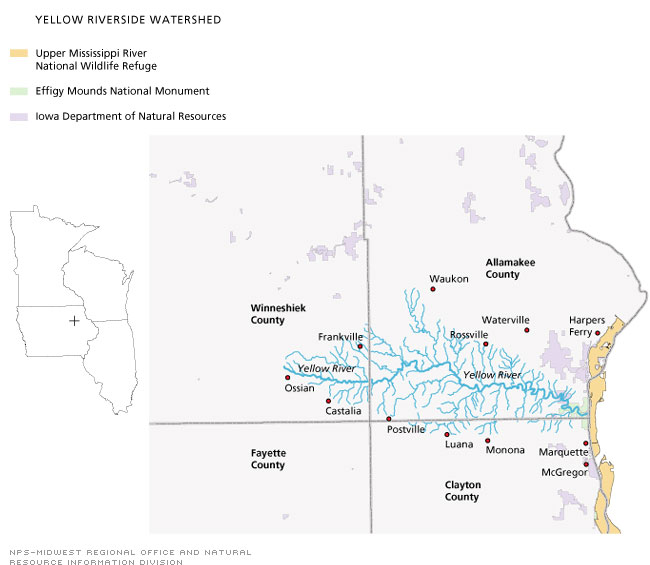
- Yellow River map

Location
- Country: US
- State: Iowa
- District: Winnisheik County, Iowa, Allamakee County, Iowa

Physical characteristics
- Mouth: Mississippi River
  - coordinates: 43.085°N 91.181°W
- Discharge
  - location: Ion, Iowa
  - average: 188 cu/ft. per sec.

The Yellow River is a 53.5-mile-long (86.1 km) tributary of the Mississippi River in northeastern Iowa. It originates in southwestern Winneshiek County and flows through southern Allamakee County, receiving tributaries from northern Clayton County, before joining the Mississippi near Marquette and Effigy Mounds National Monument.

Much of the river's course is very scenic, coursing between vegetated limestone cliffs. The watershed is located in northeastern Iowa's unglaciated Driftless Area. The catchment measures 154,666 acres (625.91 km^{2}) and is mainly state forest or farmland. Much of the region is quite rugged, and little urban development has encroached upon it.

Its beauty, lack of development, recreational potential and interesting wildlife habitats make it a candidate for development as a park. The state has developed Yellow River State Forest over time (the lavender parts of the map here). Effigy Mounds National Monument has also grown, either by direct purchase or from gifts.

== See also ==
- List of rivers in Iowa
