= Ledges State Park =

State park in Iowa, USA

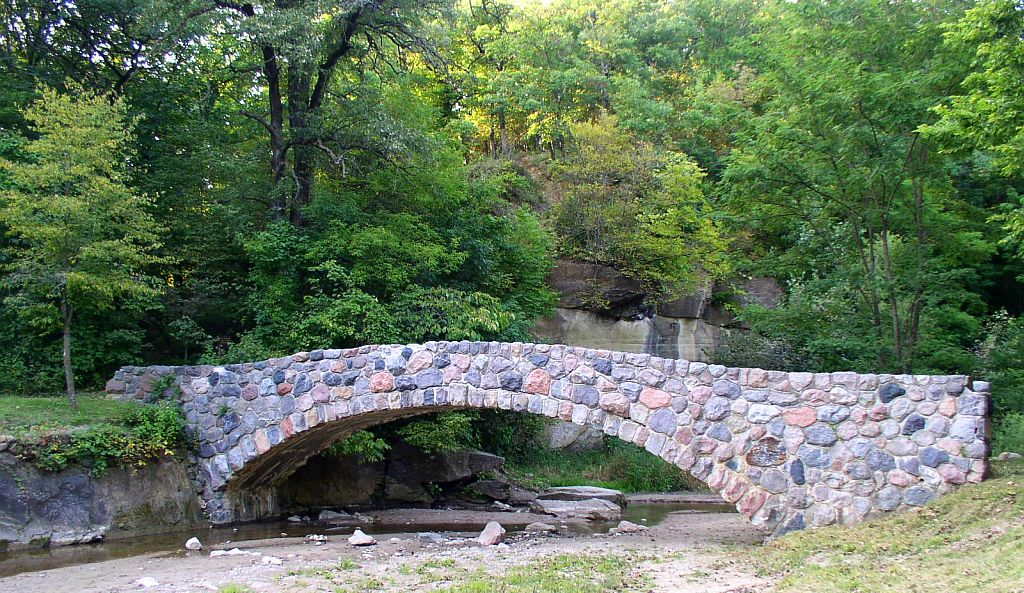
- Stone bridge built by the Civilian Conservation Corps

- Location within Iowa Location within the United States
- Location: Boone County, Iowa, United States
- Nearest city: Boone, Iowa
- Coordinates: 41°59′35″N 93°53′35″W
- Elevation: 863 ft (263 m)
- Established: 1924
- Administrator: Iowa Department of Natural Resources
- Website: Official website

Ledges State Park is a state park in Boone County, Iowa, United States, located approximately four miles (6.4 km) south of the city of Boone. The park contains a sandstone gorge carved by Pea's Creek, a tributary of the Des Moines River. The gorge is 100 feet (30 m) deep in places, with concretions jutting from the cliffs.

== Background ==
The area was designated one of the first of Iowa's state parks in 1924.

In the 1970s, the state constructed a dam along the Des Moines River, forming Saylorville Lake. This action has resulted in repeated flooding of low-lying areas of the park for decades. A group called The Iowa Citizens to Save Ledges State Park was organized in 1972 in protest of the proposed Saylorville Dam. Its primary objective was to alleviate and/or minimize the harmful effects on Ledges State Park by the Saylorville Lake Project of the U.S. Army Corps of Engineers. There were numerous conservation groups affiliated with the group, including the Ames Reservoir Environmental Study, the Iowa Conservation Commission, and the Iowa Wildlife Society.

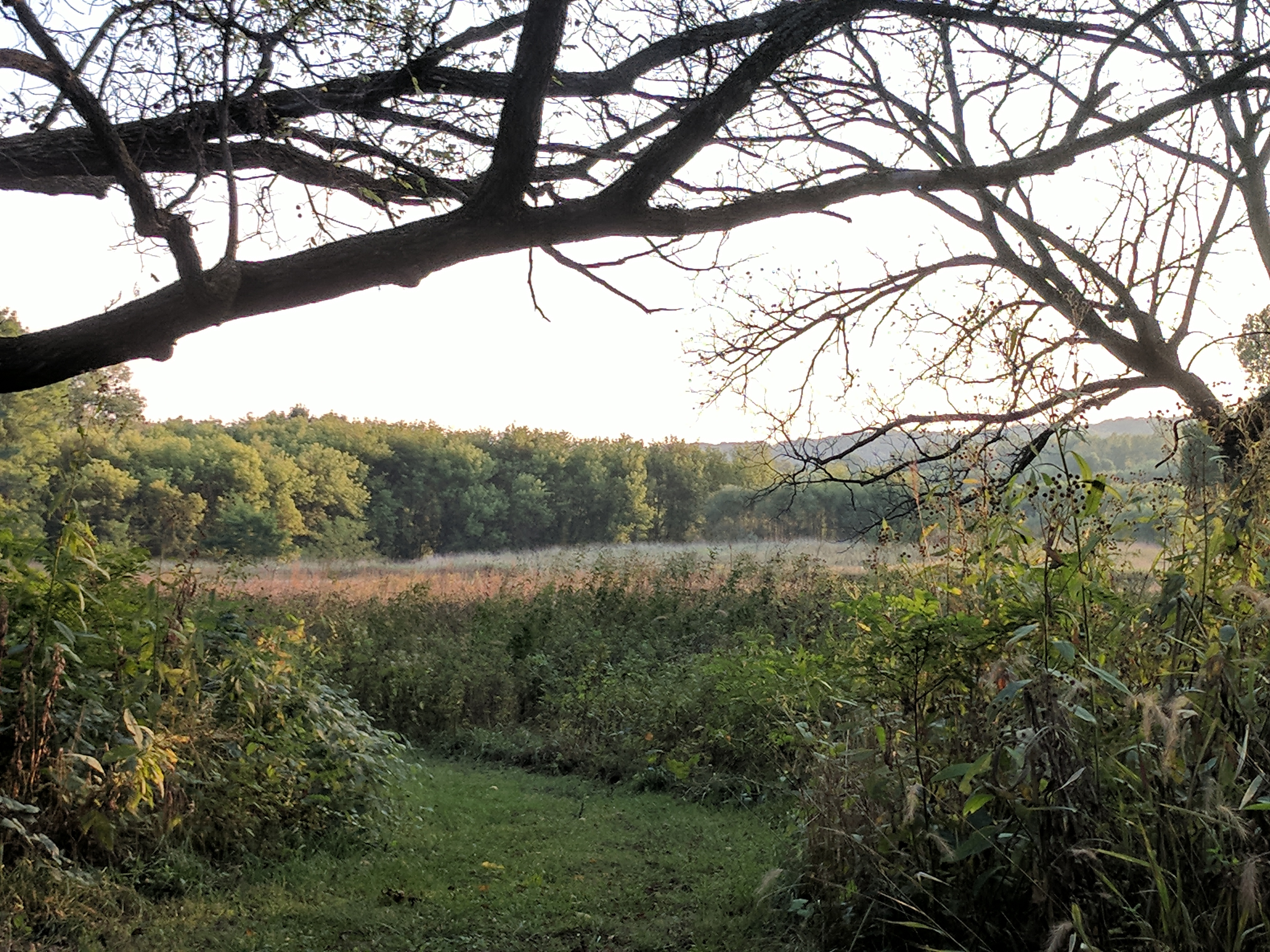
In a prairie near the Des Moines river

The repeated flooding has radically changed the appearance of the lower Ledges—the timbered areas have been greatly reduced, are often covered with silt. This is quite a change from the time when Farwell Brown and his fellow Boy Scouts camped in the Ledges in the 1920s among the lush growth in the lower Ledges. Camping and picnicking in the lower Ledges were popular recreations until the frequent floods made that area of the park less desirable. Many of the picnic areas and picnic houses in the park's flood plain have been decommissioned in the past decade. Annual flooding has made maintenance of the buildings cost prohibitive and impractical.

The park includes numerous stone buildings and bridges constructed in the 1930s by the Civilian Conservation Corps. Also included in the facilities are numerous campsites, picnic tables, and stone shelters, many of which have been destroyed in three decades of regular flooding.

Although extensive flooding to the lowermost portions of Ledges does occur in floods such as in 1993 and 2008, even the largest floods on record only submerge a small portion of the park. The canyon road, a winding one lane path traverses through Pea's and Davis creeks at five points and offers views of 50-foot-high (15 m) sandstone walls buttressing 100-foot-high (30 m) bluffs, which were created by glacial melt through sandstone deposited under an inland sea millions of years ago. Evidence of the hard work of the Civilian Conservation Corps is seen in the miles of railroad-tied trails leading up to vistas overlooking the Des Moines River Valley and the canyon.

Ledges State Park played an important role in the reintroduction of white-tailed deer across Iowa following the species's decline and extirpation from most parts of the state by the early 20th century. The park managed a captive herd of deer which was used to establish populations in new areas.

The Sioux, Fox and Sauk tribes were all once residents of the land that now comprises Ledges State Park and have constructed numerous burial mounds in the area. Mammals such as white-tailed deer, raccoon, beaver, groundhog inhabit the park, and 237 bird species have been recorded.

There is a flood pole located in the lowlands of the park which has recorded the various flood levels over the years.

== Geology ==
The sandstone of the cliffs was the remnant of the prehistoric sea that covered the Midwest approximately 300 million years ago. The cliffs themselves are the result of recent glaciation during the last ice age approximately 13,000 years ago, when meltwater carved quickly down through the rock.

== Recreation ==
Many hiking trails are located throughout the Ledges. Woodlands are located in the park containing mainly basswood, maple, oak, and hickory trees. Prairie and clearings are also located throughout the park. Canoeing and fishing is made possible as the Des Moines River runs along the west side of the park.
