= Upper Iowa River =

Upper Iowa River Oneota River
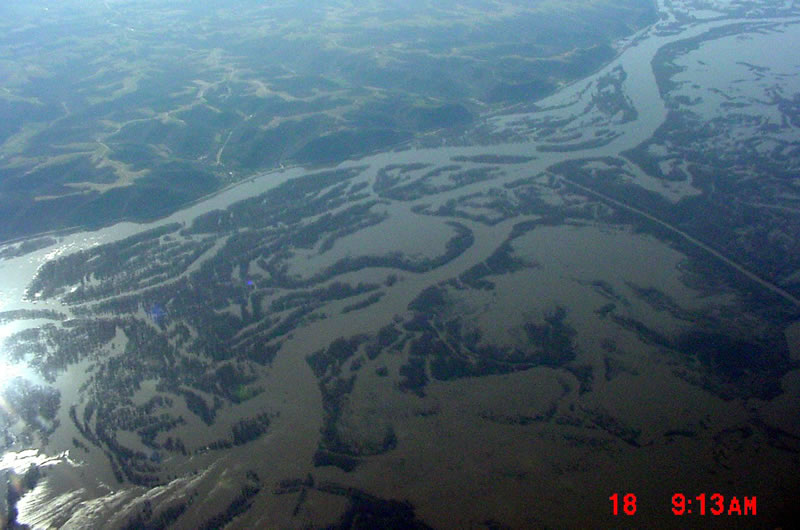
- Mouth of the Upper Iowa at floodstage, January 18, 2001, looking approximately west

- Catchment of the Upper Iowa River (EPA)

- Mouth of the Upper Iowa River

Location
- Country: United States
- State: Iowa, Minnesota
- District: Allamakee County, Iowa, Winneshiek County, Iowa, Howard County, Iowa, Fillmore County, Minnesota, Mower County, Minnesota

Physical characteristics
- Source
  - coordinates: 43.621°N 92.623°W
- Mouth: Mississippi River
  - coordinates: 43.466°N 91.234°W
  - elevation: 620 ft (190 m)
- Length: 156 mi (251 km)
- Discharge
  - location: Dorchester, Iowa
  - average: 696 cu/ft. per sec.

The Upper Iowa River is a 156-mile-long (251 km) tributary of the Mississippi River in the upper Midwest of the United States.

Its headwaters rise in southeastern Minnesota, in Mower County (Le Roy and Lodi townships) near the border with Iowa. It then flows through the Iowa counties of Howard, Winneshiek, and Allamakee, and finally into the Upper Mississippi River near New Albin, Iowa. Along its course, it passes through the Iowa cities of Chester, Lime Springs, Florenceville, Kendallville, Bluffton, and Decorah. Its watershed comprises nearly 641,000 acres (2,590 km^{2}).

The Upper Iowa and its tributaries are part of the Driftless Area of Iowa, a region that was ice-free during the last ice age. Unlike areas to the south and west, the area was not planed down by glaciation or covered in glacial drift, resulting in present-day topography featuring steep-walled canyons and high-relief bluffs.

Because of its intrinsic qualities and minimal development, the Upper Iowa River was the only river in Iowa previously considered for designation as a National Wild and Scenic River. A 1971 study conducted by the National Park Service recommended the state of Iowa designate the river as a state scenic river, and that the state then apply to the United States Department of the Interior for inclusion as a unit of the National Park Service. It has not yet attained this status, partly due to disagreements in funding between federal and state agencies and because much of the land and the riverbottom itself are privately owned (13,500 acres of desired 14,300 acres as cited in the 1971 study).

The river is a destination for canoeing, taking paddlers through the scenic bluff country. Many put their canoes in at Kendallville or nearby down river, but some paddlers prefer to start at Lime Springs by the Lidtke Mill or at Florenceville.

A number of wildlife refuges and preserves dot the river's basin. Bird sightings on the river usually include bald eagles, great blue herons, turkey vultures, and barn swallows.

In April 2007, the Iowa Natural Heritage Foundation announced the purchase of 1,224 acres (5 km^{2}) of additional land; currently off limits to the public, stabilization and restoration work will be done to the riverbank, with removal of non-native vegetation and replanting with more appropriate species.

The Upper Iowa was sometimes historically called the "Iowa River", creating confusion with the larger Iowa River to the south. The Upper Iowa was also called the "Oneota River", and the large number of Late Prehistoric sites along its bluffs caused the early archaeologist Charles R. Keyes to name the Oneota Culture for the river.

== Gallery ==
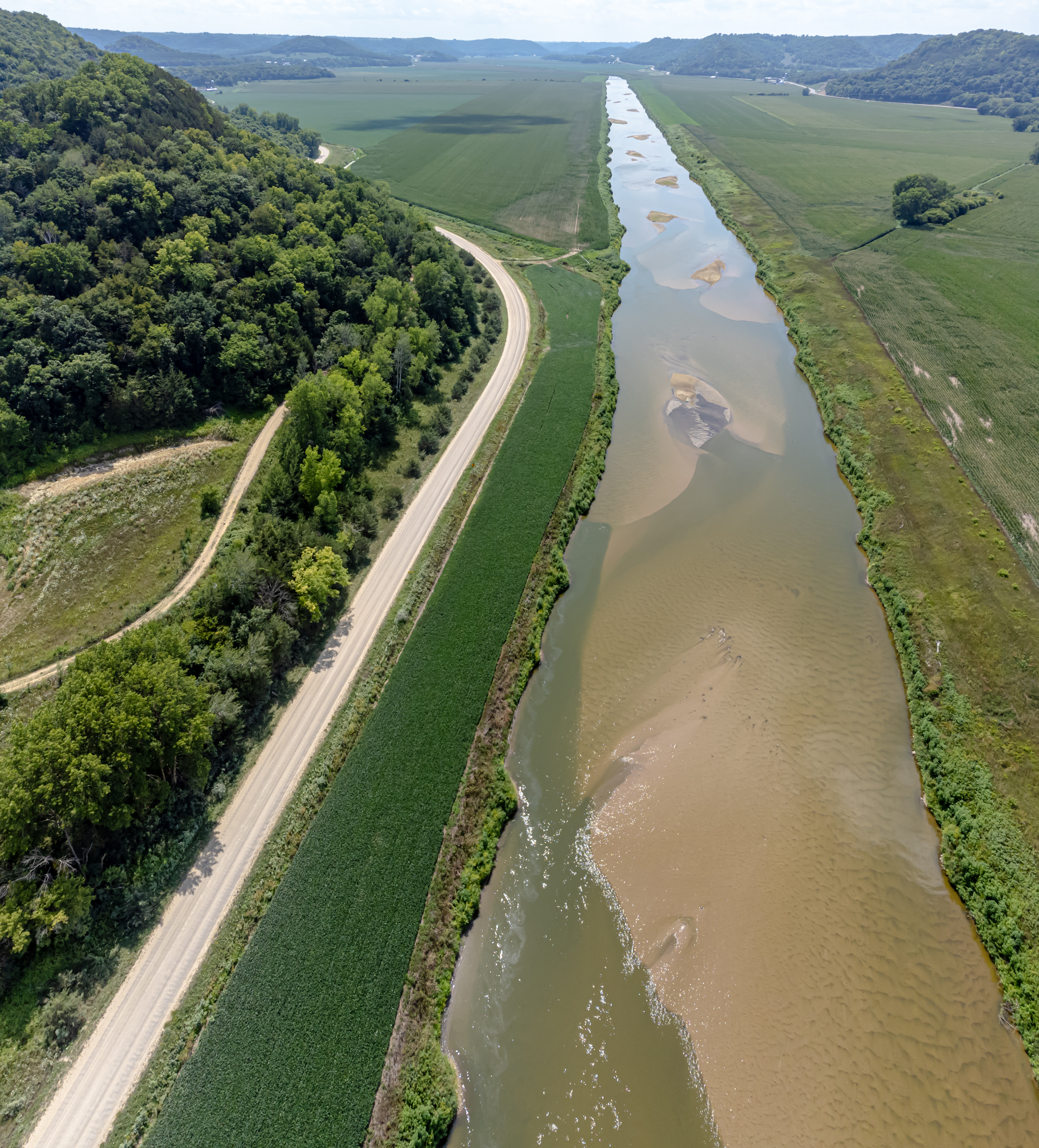
Upper Iowa River looking upstream

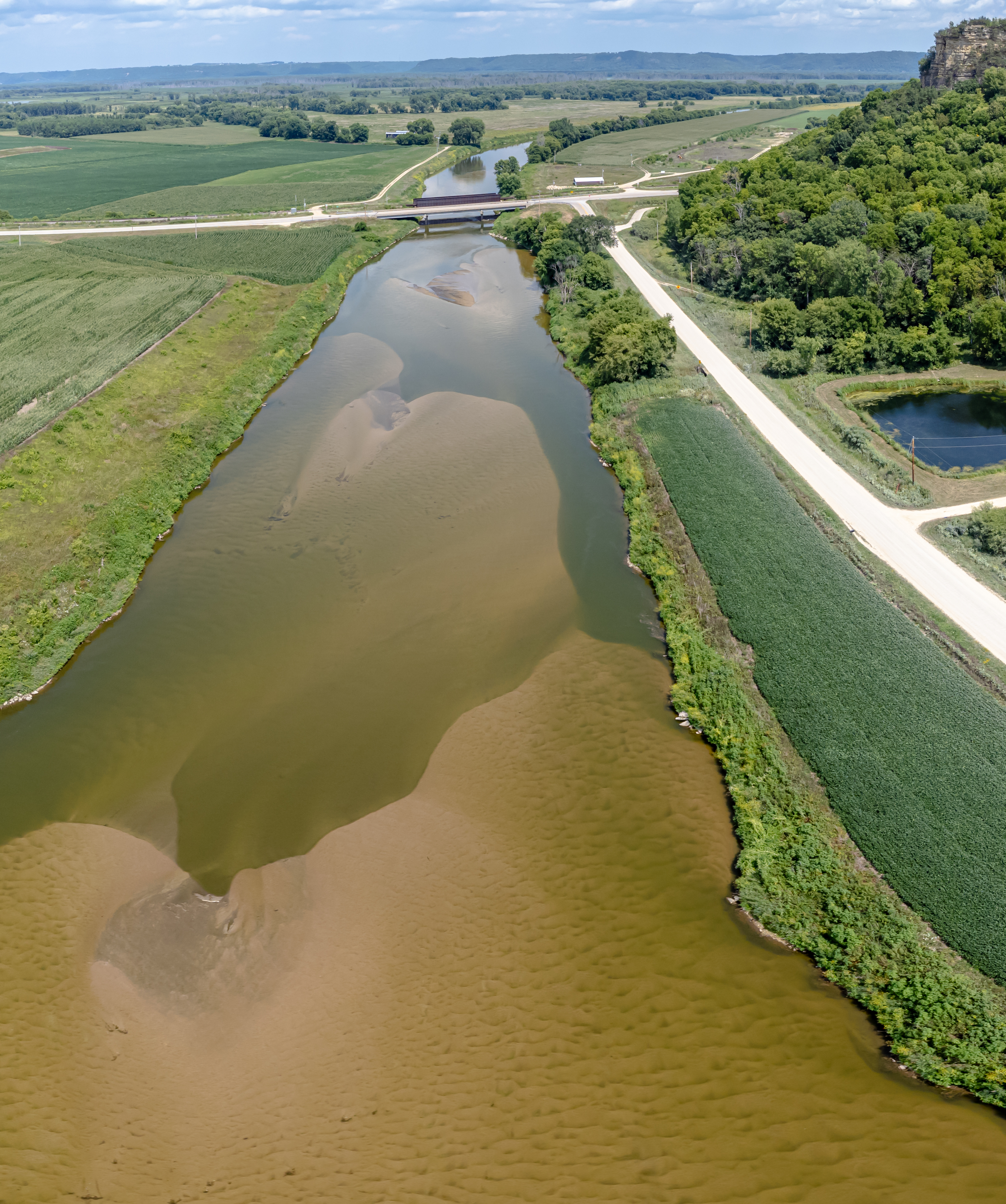
Upper Iowa River looking down stream

== See also ==
- Decorah crater, a 470-million-year-old meteor crater below the Upper Iowa River.
- List of Iowa rivers
- List of rivers of Minnesota
- List of longest streams of Minnesota
