= Dalby, Iowa =

- Unincorporated community
- Location within Iowa
- Country: United States
- State: Iowa
- County: Allamakee
- Elevation: 1,266 ft (386 m)
- Time zone: UTC-6 (Central (CST))
  - Summer (DST): UTC-5 (CDT)
- Area code: 563
- GNIS feature ID: 464511

Dalby is an unincorporated community in Allamakee County, Iowa, United States. The community was settled by Scandinavians and was first settled in the mid-1800s.

== Geography ==
Dalby is located at the junction of county highway A52 and X32, in Center Township. It is around 8 miles (13 km) southwest of Lansing.

== History ==
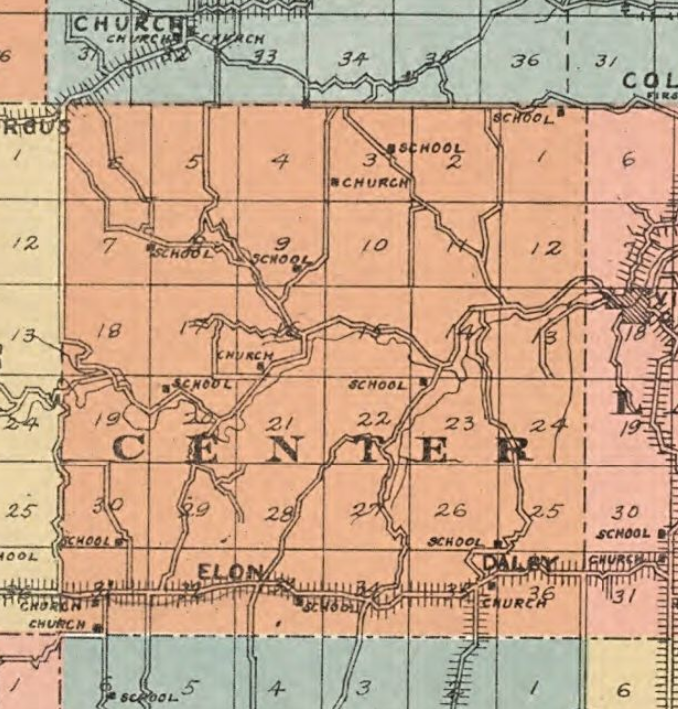
A 1917 map of Center Township, Allamakee County, Iowa, showing the location of Dalby and nearby Elon.

Dalby was founded in Center Township. A post office was opened in Dalby in 1869, and it remained in operation until it was discontinued in 1885. The community was named after Dalby in Ringsaker, Hedmark, Norway.

The Dalby School, also called Center Township School #7, was built in 1851 and still existed in 1932.

The Norwegian Lutheran Church and an associated cemetery were located in Dalby. This church, now known as the Old East Paint Creek Lutheran Church, still operates.

Other Dalby businesses and organizations, circa the 1880s, included the Scandinavian Mutual Protective Association.

The community still appears on official Iowa Department of Transportation maps.

== See also ==
- Quandahl, Iowa
