= West Paint Creek Synod Evangelical Lutheran Church and Cemetery =

Historic site in Allamakee County, Iowa

- U.S. National Register of Historic Places
- The church and cemetery in 2020

- Location within Iowa Location within the United States
- Location: 1351 Elon Dr. Waterville, Iowa
- Coordinates: 43°15′39.5″N 91°21′33.2″W
- Built: 1892
- Architectural style: Carpenter Gothic
- NRHP reference No.: 100003422
- Added to NRHP: March 7, 2019

West Paint Creek Synod Evangelical Lutheran Church and Cemetery is a historic building and site located northwest of Waterville, Iowa, United States. The church building and its adjacent cemetery were listed together on the National Register of Historic Places in 2019.

== History ==
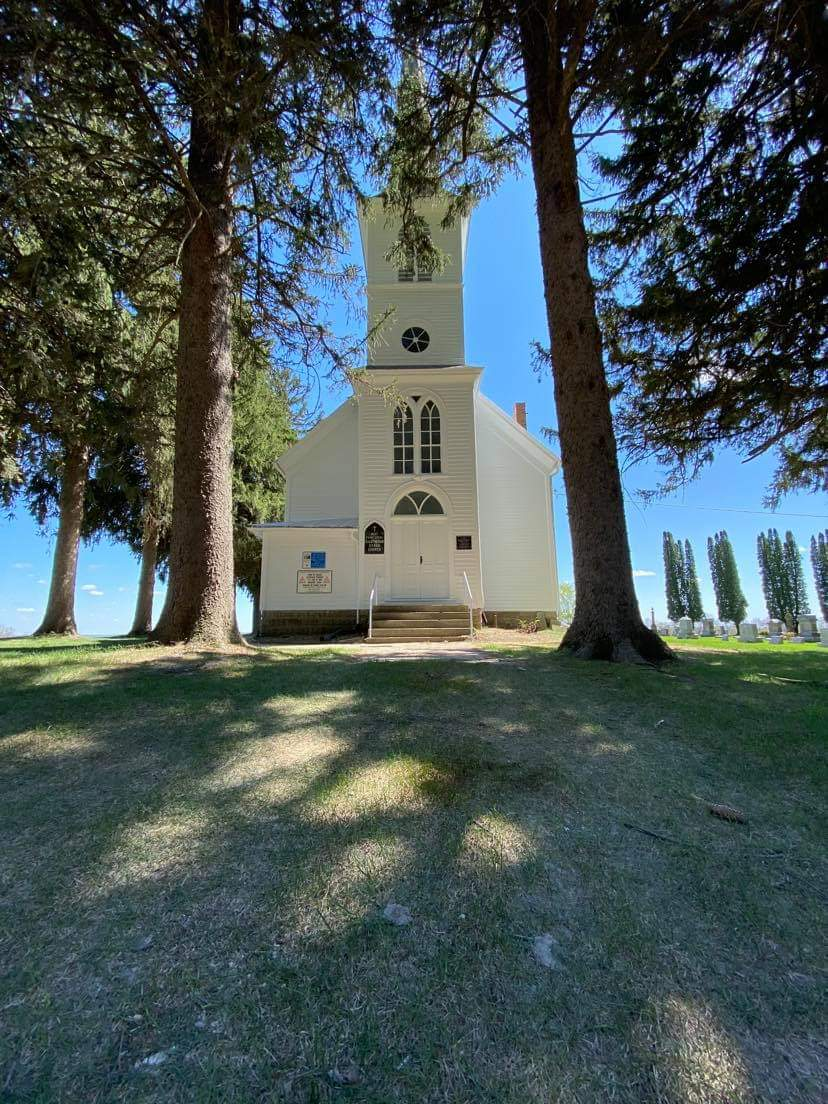
West Paint Creek Synod Evangelical Lutheran Church and Cemetery

Norwegian immigrants came to Allamakee County starting in the early 1850s. Their numbers increased after the American Civil War beginning in the late 1860s and continuing into the 1880s. They established the first Lutheran church in the area in 1850. It is still in existence and is now known as Old East Paint Creek Lutheran Church. A second congregation, known as the West Paint Creek Church, was organized in 1857 because parishioners found it difficult to navigate the poor roads in the area. In 1880 a controversy over predestination erupted among Norwegian Lutherans and affected the congregations in the Paint Creek area. A small group broke away from the original churches in 1887 and formed two congregations known as the East Paint Creek Synod and West Paint Creek Synod churches. The subject of this article is the West Paint Creek Synod Church. To distinguish between the two groups, the original churches were renamed Old East Paint Creek Church and Old West Paint Creek Church. The Old West Paint Creek Church is still in existence and located to the south of this church building on Maud Road.

Peter and Sophia Paulson deeded a little more than 1 acre (0.40 ha) of land to the West Paint Creek Synod congregation in 1890. They built this frame Carpenter Gothic church building, completed in 1892. It features three lancet windows on the side elevations, a gable-front roof, and a central bell tower capped with a spire. The building exhibits Norwegian immigrant carpentry skills found in the Dutch lap siding, frame construction, paneled doors, pews, and flooring. The interior includes a wood-carved altar, altar rail, and pulpit in the chancel. The pews of native pine have an ornate cross carved on each side. The altar's reredos features a painting by itinerant Norwegian immigrant artist Herbjorn Gausta called Resurrection. The cemetery is located on the west side of the church, and there is a shed on the property that was built in 1938.

The church building was the site of the local community's religious and social life. Its significance is found in its association with Norwegian and Norwegian-American architecture and social history.
