= Paint Creek (Iowa) =

Tributary of the Upper Mississippi River

Coordinates: 43.1316486°N 91.1806856°W

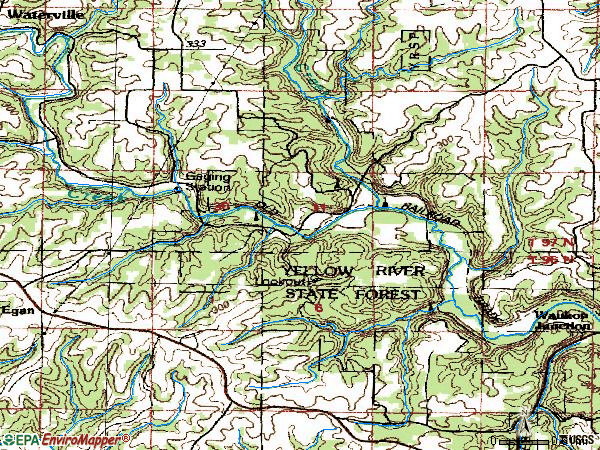
Paint Creek showing confluence with Little Paint Creek (United States Environmental Protection Agency)

Paint Creek is a direct tributary of the Upper Mississippi River, rising in central Allamakee County, Iowa, in and about the city of Waukon. The catchment measures approximately 85.5 square miles (221 km^{2}). It has some still-rural stretches past 9th Street Southwest in Waukon, but most of the actual Waukon portions have been culverted. It joins the Mississippi approximately 6 miles (9.7 km) above Marquette, Iowa in (Lock and Dam) Pool 10, near river mile 641.

The upper reaches have surface water only after rainstorms, but as one goes east to the Mississippi, cutting down deeply into the gorge of the Mississippi, a serious cold water ever-flowing stream is encountered, fed by springs. Even in the worst drought years, Paint Creek always has water. By the time the creek reaches Waterville, it flows through a canyon between almost-vertical cliffs some 150 feet high. By the time the creek reaches the Mississippi River, it has cut a full 350 feet into the rock.

The watershed is divided into Big Paint Creek and Little Paint Creek. Once outside of Waukon, the creek travels through entirely rural country. Less than optimal farming practices have created erosion problems, leading to excess sediment being transported downstream into the River, and the Army Corps of Engineers is developing plans to combat this.

It takes its name from Paint Rock Bluff, near Waukon Junction, Iowa. Once an important navigational landmark for Mississippi River traffic, it was named for the Indian paintings and petroglyphs on it.

Notwithstanding its name, much of the Yellow River State Forest lies within the Paint Creek watershed where the state maintains backpacking and equestrian trails, campgrounds and other such recreational amenities. The region is quite scenic, with rugged limestone cliffs and lush woodlands.

Locally, it is also a place name, mainly of Lutheran Churches (the East Paint and West Paint churches). There is also a private Christian campground in the area.

== See also ==
- List of rivers of Iowa
- Paint Creek Township, Allamakee County, Iowa

== Sources ==
- Army Corps of Engineers site
- Iowa Department of Natural Resources
- EPA
- Commercial horse stable
- Iowa Audubon Society
- Brochure, Iowa DNR (*.pdf)
