= Old Allamakee County Courthouse =

Old Allamakee County Courthouse may refer to:

- Old Allamakee County Courthouse (Waukon, Iowa), now the Allamakee County Historical Museum
- Old Allamakee County Courthouse (Lansing, Iowa)
