= Old Allamakee County Courthouse (Lansing, Iowa) =

- U.S. National Register of Historic Places
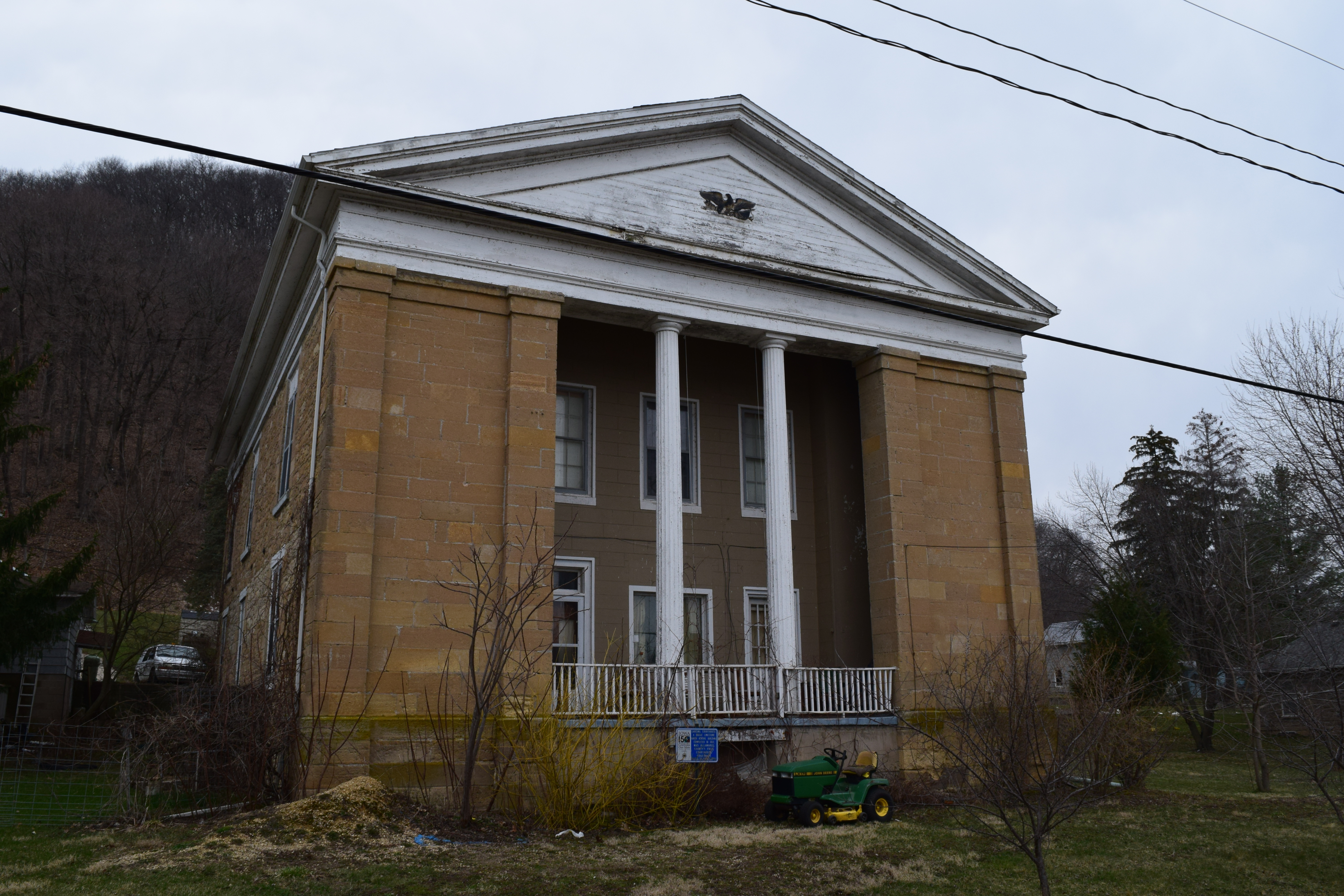

- Location within Iowa Location within the United States
- Location: 2nd St. Lansing, Iowa
- Coordinates: 43°21′20″N 91°12′44″W
- Area: less than one acre
- Built: 1861
- Architectural style: Greek Revival
- MPS: County Courthouses in Iowa TR
- NRHP reference No.: 83000338
- Added to NRHP: February 24, 1983

The Old Allamakee County Courthouse, located on 2nd Street in Lansing, is a short-lived former county courthouse of Allamakee County, Iowa. The courthouse was completed in 1861 amid a fight between Lansing and Waukon over which community deserved to be the county seat. Lansing had lost a vote on the county seat to Waukon in 1859, but they won another vote in 1861 after teaming up with the community of Columbus. Waukon built its own courthouse in the meantime, but it failed to win back the county seat in yet another vote in 1864. The county sheriff, a Waukon resident, attempted to seize the county's records from the Lansing courthouse in 1866; however, a posse from Lansing stopped him before he could return to Waukon. The Iowa Supreme Court decided the county seat battle in favor of Waukon the following year; it has remained there since.

The Lansing courthouse is now one of the only Greek Revival courthouses remaining in Iowa. The building features a recessed portico at the front entrance and curved stairways in its front corners, features not seen in any other Iowa courthouse.

The courthouse was added to the National Register of Historic Places of February 24, 1983.
