= French Township =

French Township may refer to the following townships in the United States:

- French Township, Adams County, Indiana
- French Township, St. Louis County, Minnesota

== See also ==
- French Creek Township (disambiguation)
- French Lake Township, Wright County, Minnesota
- French Lick Township, Orange County, Indiana
