= Neely Dickson =

American theater impresario

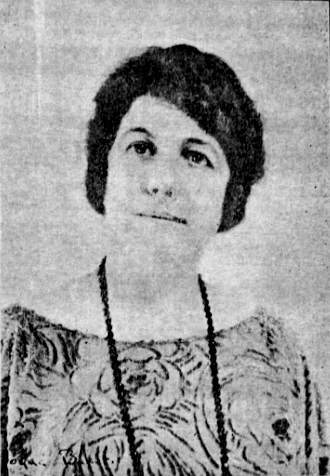
- Born: May 19, 1877; Franklin Township, Allamakee County, Iowa
- Died: January 25, 1946 (aged 68)
- Education: Northwestern University School of Oratory, c. 1895
- Occupations: Theater founder, director, and acting teacher
- Years active: 1917-1946
- Known for: The Hollywood Community Theater

Neely Dickson (May 19, 1877 – January 25, 1946) was an American theater impresario, drama teacher, and founder of the Hollywood Community Theater (1917–1922) and its subsequent school.

== Early life and education ==
She was born Nelie May Dickson on May 19, 1877 in Franklin Township, Allamakee County, Iowa, to Nancy Elmira Lamira Dickinson Dickson (1853–1917) and John Hussic or Huzzie Dickson (1843–1910). Both of her parents had similar surnames. Her father was born in Glasgow, Scotland. She had two brothers and four sisters, including Grace (1887-1969), who relocated to Los Angeles to live with her sister and work in the theater as an art director in charge of lighting, sets, and costumes. Nelie changed the spelling of her first name to Neely sometime before 1917, and may have lowered her age by five or six years when she launched her business in Hollywood. Dickson graduated from Northwestern University's School of Oratory circa 1895.

== Theater ==
She received some of her funding from a noted playwright, William C. deMille, older brother of Cecil B. DeMille, who assured an all-star cast for opening night. She started the new theater in a building that had previously been a bowling alley, and was noted in magazines and the news as being modest. The Los Angeles Times hailed the theater as "one of the most artistically conducted little theaters in America." She received published, public praise for her accomplishment from many stars in England and the United States that included Sir J. M. Barrie, John Galsworthy, Charlie Chaplin, King Vidor, Douglas Fairbanks, and Katherine MacDonald.

As part of a nationwide little theatre movement, her theater may have inspired Harold Lloyd's 1931 effort, the Beverly Hills Little Theatre for Professionals. They both served as important incubators for new actors, and a means of helping established stage performers navigate to the burgeoning medium of cinema by getting them in front of Hollywood talent scouts. She advertised special coaching for those struggling to make the transition from silent to talking pictures. Her theater thrived for five years before losing its lease, and she continued as a successful teacher, sometimes continuing to use the Hollywood Community Theater name for subsequent productions. Actors such as Lawrence Tibbett, Edward Everett Horton, Dana Andrews, and Academy Award winner Conrad Nagle got their start in Hollywood films by debuting in her productions. Other actors who studied with her included Betty Grable, Robert Taylor, Julie Haydon, Rosella Towne, and Paulette Goddard.
