= Waterville, Iowa =

- City
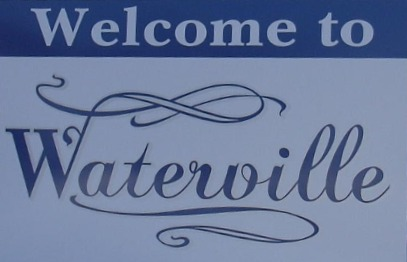
- Sign

- Location of Waterville, Iowa
- Coordinates: 43°12′28″N 91°17′48″W
- Country: United States
- State: Iowa
- County: Allamakee
- Township: Paint Creek
- Established: 1850
- Incorporated: June 18, 1912

Area
  - Total: 0.35 sq mi (0.91 km^{2})
  - Land: 0.35 sq mi (0.91 km^{2})
  - Water: 0 sq mi (0.00 km^{2})
- Elevation: 860 ft (260 m)

Population (2020)
  - Total: 109
  - Density: 310.9/sq mi (120.02/km^{2})
- Time zone: UTC-6 (Central (CST))
  - Summer (DST): UTC-5 (CDT)
- ZIP code: 52170
- Area code: 563
- FIPS code: 19-82470
- GNIS feature ID: 2397213
- Website: www.watervilleiowa.com

Waterville is a city in Paint Creek Township, Allamakee County, Iowa, United States. The population was 109 at the time of the 2020 census.

== History ==
The first settlement in the neighborhood of what would become Waterville was in 1850. In 1854, Nathaniel Beebe erected the Waterville Mill. In 1855, Col. J. Spooner opened a store, and in 1856, James Beebe built a hotel. The Waterville Post Office was established in 1855. The Waukon and Mississippi Railroad was completed through town in 1877, at which point Waterville became the only station between Waukon and Waukon Junction.

Waterville was incorporated as a city on June 18, 1912.

== Geography ==
Waterville is 14 miles from Waukon and 9 miles from the Mississippi River, on the north bank of Paint Creek. At Waterville, the Paint Creek canyon is 150 feet deep, bounded by almost vertical cliffs of Oneota Dolomite.

According to the United States Census Bureau, the city has a total area of 0.43 square miles (1.11 km^{2}), all land.

== Demographics ==
Historical populations
Year	Pop.	±%
1880	73	—
1890	82	+12.3%
1900	99	+20.7%
1910	114	+15.2%
1920	183	+60.5%
1930	222	+21.3%
1940	253	+14.0%
1950	199	−21.3%
1960	184	−7.5%
1970	158	−14.1%
1980	157	−0.6%
1990	140	−10.8%
2000	145	+3.6%
2010	144	−0.7%
2020	109	−24.3%
Source:"U.S. Census website". United States Census Bureau. and Iowa Data Center; Source: U.S. Decennial Census

=== 2020 census ===
As of the census of 2020, there were 109 people, 49 households, and 36 families residing in the city. The population density was 310.9 inhabitants per square mile (120.0/km^{2}). There were 57 housing units at an average density of 162.6 per square mile (62.8/km^{2}). The racial makeup of the city was 95.4% White, 0.0% Black or African American, 0.0% Native American, 0.0% Asian, 0.0% Pacific Islander, 0.0% from other races and 4.6% from two or more races. Hispanic or Latino persons of any race comprised 0.9% of the population.

Of the 49 households, 34.7% of which had children under the age of 18 living with them, 55.1% were married couples living together, 8.2% were cohabitating couples, 18.4% had a female householder with no spouse or partner present and 18.4% had a male householder with no spouse or partner present. 26.5% of all households were non-families. 26.5% of all households were made up of individuals, 6.1% had someone living alone who was 65 years old or older.

The median age in the city was 48.9 years. 20.2% of the residents were under the age of 20; 4.6% were between the ages of 20 and 24; 14.7% were from 25 and 44; 37.6% were from 45 and 64; and 22.9% were 65 years of age or older. The gender makeup of the city was 52.3% male and 47.7% female.

=== 2010 census ===
As of the census of 2010, there were 144 people, 59 households, and 37 families living in the city. The population density was 334.9 inhabitants per square mile (129.3/km^{2}). There were 61 housing units at an average density of 141.9 per square mile (54.8/km^{2}). The racial makeup of the city was 98.6% White and 1.4% from other races. Hispanic or Latino of any race were 1.4% of the population.

There were 59 households, of which 37.3% had children under the age of 18 living with them, 50.8% were married couples living together, 5.1% had a female householder with no husband present, 6.8% had a male householder with no wife present, and 37.3% were non-families. 30.5% of all households were made up of individuals, and 13.6% had someone living alone who was 65 years of age or older. The average household size was 2.44 and the average family size was 3.05.

The median age in the city was 38 years. 29.2% of residents were under the age of 18; 3.4% were between the ages of 18 and 24; 23.6% were from 25 to 44; 31.3% were from 45 to 64; and 12.5% were 65 years of age or older. The gender makeup of the city was 55.6% male and 44.4% female.

=== 2000 census ===
As of the census of 2000, there were 145 people, 53 households, and 39 families living in the city. The population density was 333.9 inhabitants per square mile (128.9/km^{2}). There were 63 housing units at an average density of 145.1 per square mile (56.0/km^{2}). The racial makeup of the city was 99.31% White, and 0.69% from two or more races.

There were 53 households, out of which 37.7% had children under the age of 18 living with them, 60.4% were married couples living together, 3.8% had a female householder with no husband present, and 26.4% were non-families. 20.8% of all households were made up of individuals, and 9.4% had someone living alone who was 65 years of age or older. The average household size was 2.74 and the average family size was 3.21.

Age spread: 32.4% under the age of 18, 5.5% from 18 to 24, 27.6% from 25 to 44, 23.4% from 45 to 64, and 11.0% who were 65 years of age or older. The median age was 37 years. For every 100 females, there were 119.7 males. For every 100 females age 18 and over, there were 117.8 males.

The median income for a household in the city was $35,625, and the median income for a family was $36,667. Males had a median income of $26,250 versus $16,875 for females. The per capita income for the city was $12,277. There were 7.9% of families and 10.3% of the population living below the poverty line, including 8.9% of under eighteens and 29.4% of those over 64.

== Education ==
Waterville is part of the Allamakee Community School District, which at one time operated an elementary school in the city, the building is now a community center.

== See also ==
- Old East Paint Creek Lutheran Church, listed on the National Register of Historic Places
