= Old East Paint Creek Lutheran Church =

- U.S. National Register of Historic Places
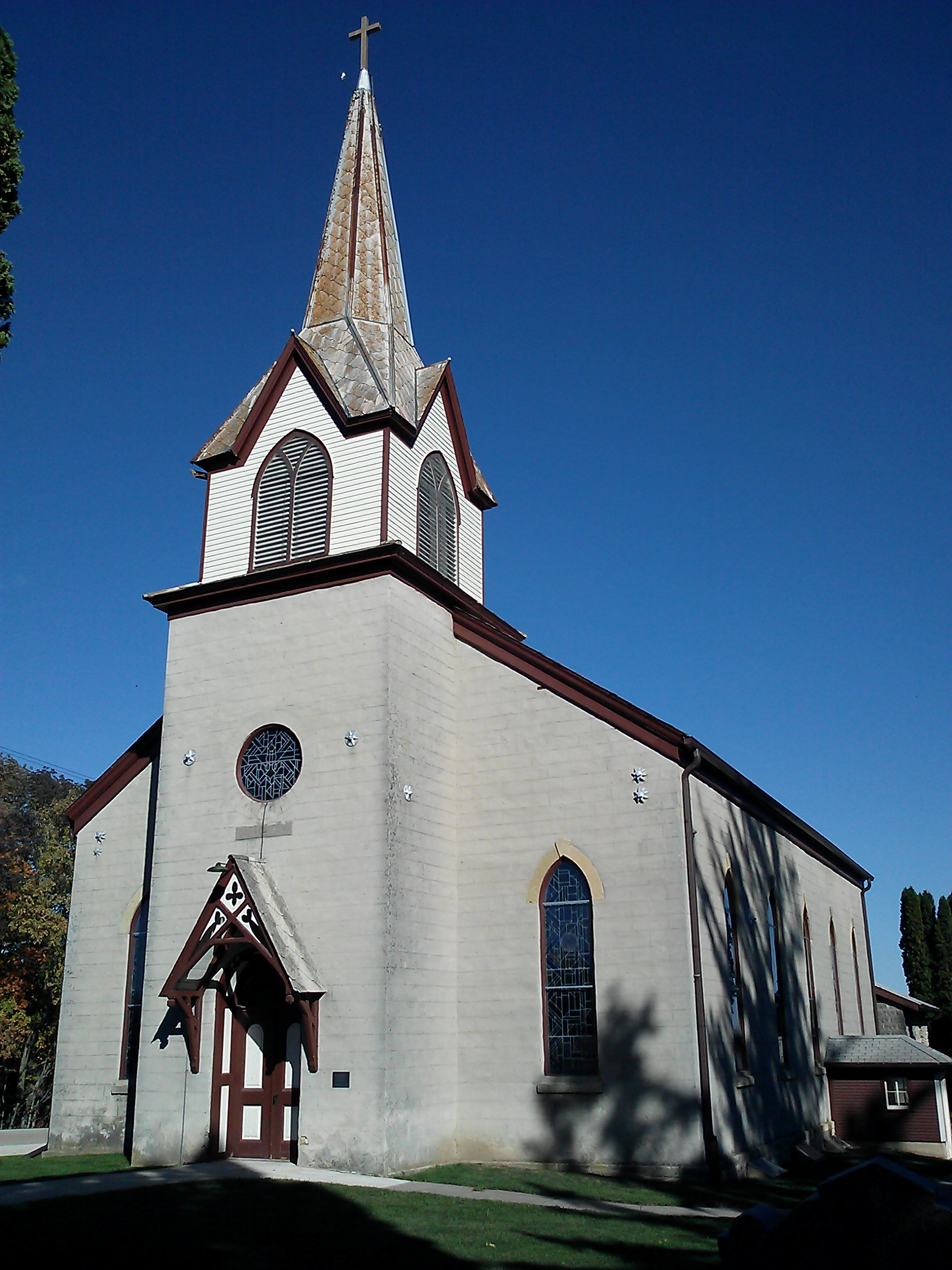

- Location within Iowa Location within the United States
- Location: North of Waterville, Iowa on County Road A-52
- Coordinates: 43°15′52″N 91°18′11″W
- Area: less than one acre
- Built: 1868
- Built by: W.A. Eriksen
- Architectural style: Gothic Revival
- NRHP reference No.: 83000339
- Added to NRHP: July 7, 1983

Old East Paint Creek Lutheran Church is located north of Waterville, Iowa, United States. The church building was listed on the National Register of Historic Places in 1983.

== History ==
In the autumn of 1850, the meeting was held to organize a Christian school and a place for worship by the first Norwegian immigrant settlers to the Paint Creek area of Allamakee County. The school was organized in March the following year with Ole Larson as the first teacher. The first church services were held in July in the home of Thomas Anderson by Pastor Claus Lauritz Clausen from Rock County, Wisconsin. The schoolhouse was completed by November 1851 and was used for church services as well.

Initially, the congregation had only visiting ministers. They sent a Letter of Call to Norway for their own pastor. It was answered by the Rev. U. V. Koren, who arrived in late 1853 and stayed until 1862 when he returned to Norway. All of East Paint Creek's early pastors were from Norway. In July 1855 it was decided to build a log structure for a church, which was completed in 1857. The congregation grew in size and divided into two separate churches, East Paint Creek Church and West Paint Creek Church, because of the poor roads in the area.

The cornerstone for the present church was laid on May 24, 1869, and the church was dedicated on August 24, 1870. W.A. Eriksen constructed the Gothic Revival style building. The Rev. Ove Jacob Hjort (1827–1879) was the pastor at the time. A cemetery, which pre-dates it, surrounds the church building. Services were conducted in Norwegian, at least partially, into the 1930s.

In 1880, a controversy over predestination erupted among Norwegian Lutherans which affected the congregations in the Paint Creek area. A small group broke away from the original churches and became known as the East and West Synod Lutheran Churches. To distinguish between the two groups, the original churches were renamed Old East Paint Creek Church and Old West Paint Creek Church. Old East Paint remained in the Anti-Missourian Brotherhood until 1890, when that group merged into the United Norwegian Lutheran Church of America.

Old East is currently a member of the North American Lutheran Church (NALC) and open every Sunday.

== Architecture ==
The main church follows a rectangular plan, measuring 64 by 44 feet (20 by 13 m). The exterior is composed of locally quarried limestone covered with stucco. The projecting central pavilion is capped with a frame bell chamber and spire that rises to a height of 100 feet (30 m). The main entrance, also located in the central pavilion, is located within an elliptical arch that is framed by a Gothic portico. The side elevations feature five lancet windows that are symmetrically placed.

A vestry was added later to the rear of the church sanctuary. Its exterior is also composed of limestone that is laid in random coursed ashlar without a stucco covering. It may indicate the appearance of the main church without the stucco. A new basement and foundation were built beneath the church and vestry from 1949 to 1952. Matching additions with shed roofs were built on each side of the vestry in 1967.

The interior features its original wooden altar, pulpit, baptismal font, pews, altar rail, and a two-tier brass chandelier. The stained glass windows date from 1957. The original balcony stairs were replaced in 1970. The sanctuary interior is capped with a pressed tin ceiling.
