= Paint Rock Bluff =

Cliff in Allamakee County, Iowa

Coordinates: 43°09′55″N 91°10′45″W

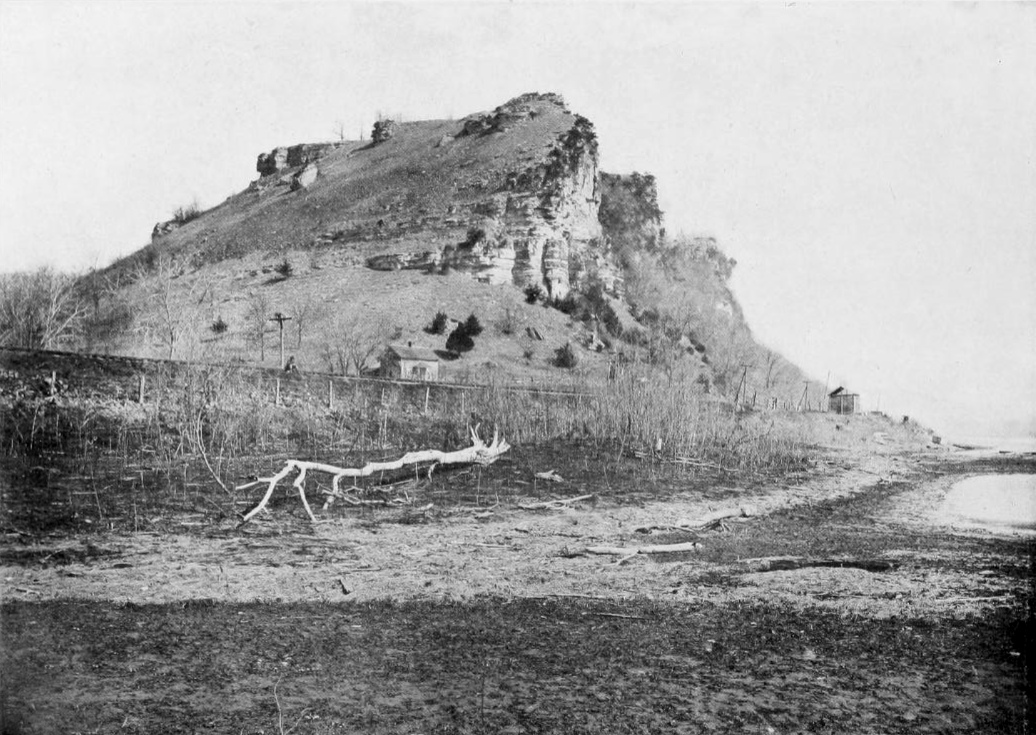
A view of Paint Rock bluff looking northwest from the edge of Harper's Channel, c. 1913.

Paint Rock Bluff, also known as Paint Rock or Painted Rock, is a cliff along the Mississippi River in Allamakee County, Iowa, United States. The cliff was once a major navigational landmark for steamboats on the Upper Mississippi River. It was once the site of a Ho-Chunk village, and is noted for Native American petroglyphs and paintings. These glyphs and paintings have been badly damaged by the elements and vandalism.

As a hydronym, it gives its name to Paint Creek.

The nearest town is Waukon Junction, Iowa.
