= Allamakee County Court House =

- U.S. National Register of Historic Places
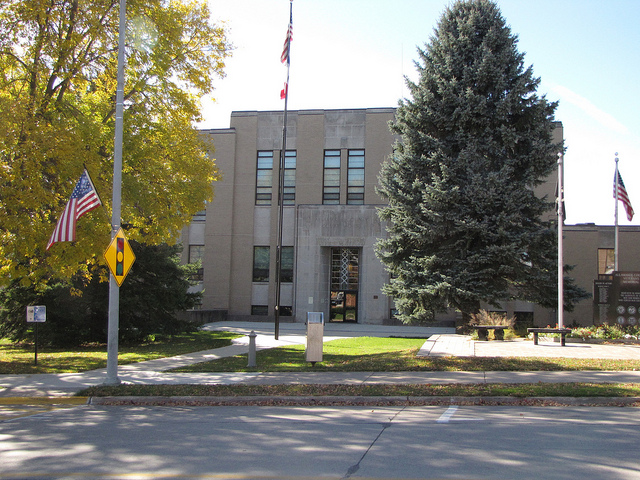

- Location within Iowa Location within the United States
- Interactive map showing the location for Allamakee County Courthouse
- Location: 110 Allamakee St. Waukon, Iowa
- Coordinates: 43°16′14″N 91°28′35″W
- Built: 1940
- Built by: Rye & Henkel
- Architect: Charles Altfillisch
- MPS: PWA-Era County Courthouses of IA MPS
- NRHP reference No.: 03000827
- Added to NRHP: August 28, 2003

The Allamakee County Court House in Waukon, Iowa, United States was built in 1940. It was placed on the National Register of Historic Places in 2003 as a part of the PWA-Era County Courthouses of IA Multiple Properties Submission. The courthouse is the third building the county has used for court functions and county administration.

== History ==
There was a long and bitter fight between the towns of Waukon and Lansing as to which one would be the county seat in Allamakee County. Leaders held ten elections to determine the county seat before the American Civil War. A frame building in Waukon was used as a courthouse from 1854 to 1861. A more permanent courthouse and jail were completed in Waukon for $13,635 in 1861. In 1867, the Iowa Supreme Court finally settled the debate when it ruled that Waukon was the county seat. The building constructed in 1861 served as the county courthouse until 1940.

The county board of supervisors applied for and received a grant in 1938 from the Public Works Administration (PWA) to pay for 45 percent of the construction costs for a new courthouse. On September 22, of the same year voters approved a referendum authorizing the sale of $105,000 in bonds for construction. Decorah architect Charles Altfillisch was chosen to design the building. Bids for construction were submitted and reviewed in March 1939 and Rye & Henkel of Mason City, Iowa won the contract. The Allamakee County Court House was the last PWA funded courthouse built in Iowa.

== Architecture ==
The architectural style of the building is known as Depression Modern or PWA Moderne. The exterior of the building is composed of pressed brick and Bedford limestone. On the interior, the central corridors extend the length of the building and various county offices open onto the corridor. The interior features a monochromatic color palette and terrazzo floors that are laid out in large squares. The corridors were finished in plaster and marble, and aluminum handrails were used in the staircases. This courthouse has more structural problems associated with it than any others built during the PWA era in Iowa. An American Civil War monument dating from the 1920s stands on the courthouse grounds.
