= Waukon, Iowa =

- City
- Waukon City Hall in 2020

- Logo

- Location of Waukon within County and State

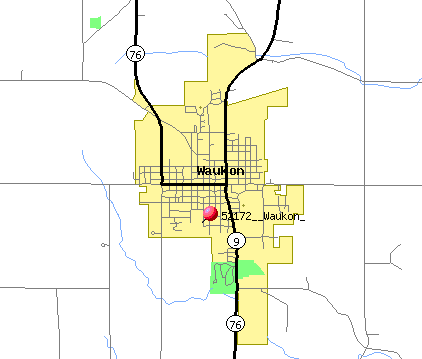
- Detailed local map of Waukon
- Coordinates: 43°15′50″N 91°28′55″W
- Country: United States
- State: Iowa
- County: Allamakee
- Townships: Makee, Union Prairie, Jefferson, Ludlow
- Settled: 1849
- Incorporated: April 4, 1883

Area
  - Total: 2.84 sq mi (7.35 km^{2})
  - Land: 2.84 sq mi (7.35 km^{2})
  - Water: 0 sq mi (0.00 km^{2})
- Elevation: 1,263 ft (385 m)

Population (2020)
  - Total: 3,827
  - Density: 1,349.4/sq mi (520.99/km^{2})
- Time zone: UTC-6 (Central (CST))
  - Summer (DST): UTC-5 (CDT)
- ZIP code: 52172
- Area code: 563
- FIPS code: 19-82740
- GNIS feature ID: 2397223
- Website: www.cityofwaukon.com

Waukon is a city in Makee Township, Allamakee County, Iowa, United States, and the county seat of Allamakee County. The population was 3,827 at the time of the 2020 census.

== History ==
Waukon is often said to be named for Waukon Decorah, a Ho Chunk (Winnebago) leader who was a U.S. ally during the 1832 Black Hawk War, although the city is also said to be named for his son Chief John Waukon. Winnebagos lived in this area of Iowa in the 1840s, before being forced to relocate to Minnesota.

The first white settler arrived in 1849, and the city was founded and the Waukon Post Office opened in 1853. A courthouse was completed in 1861, and the county seat was moved to Waukon in 1867 after 8 elections attempting to decide the location of the county seat. The city was incorporated on April 4, 1883.

Waukon is only about 16 miles from Waukon Junction, on the Mississippi River, but the rail line between these two points was 33 miles long, climbing 600 feet through some of the roughest terrain in Iowa. The Waukon and Mississippi Railroad, which opened in 1877, was originally built as a narrow gauge line. The line was originally controlled by the Chicago and Northwestern but was quickly acquired by the Chicago, Milwaukee and St. Paul Railway. The line was widened to standard gauge after purchase by the Milwaukee Road. Its only marginal traffic through its existence led to the road's abandonment in the late 1960s.

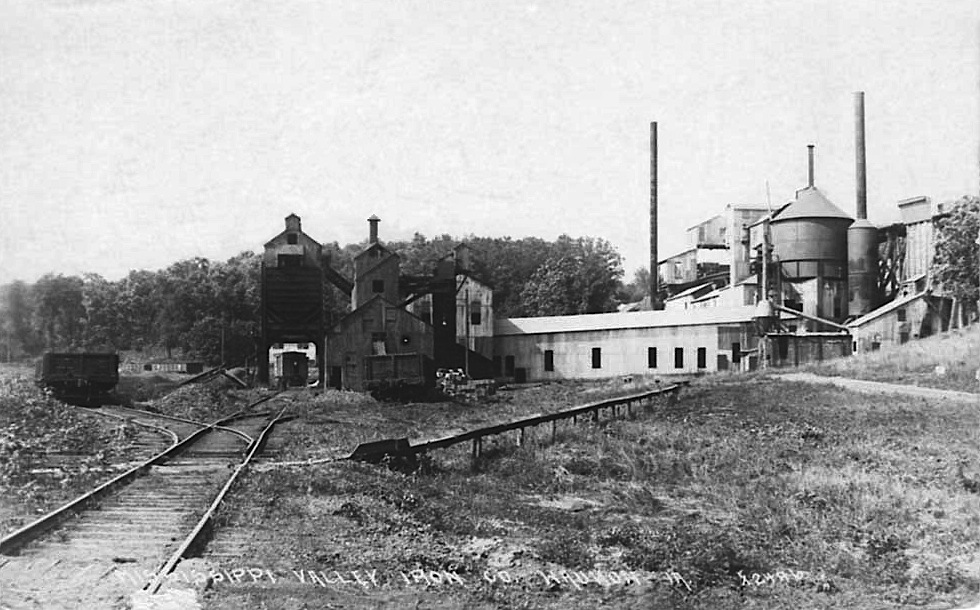
The Mississippi Valley Iron Co. ore processing plant in 1918.

There is a deposit of limonite (Iron Ore) about 3 miles northeast of Waukon called Iron Mine Hill, holding an estimated 10 million tons of ore. This is the highest point in northeastern Iowa. the Waukon Iron Company began developing an open-pit mine and ore-washing plant on this site in 1899, with a capacity of 300 tons per 10-hour shift. Production was seriously limited by the need to haul the ore 3 miles to the railroad, and the mine was, ultimately, a failure.

A second and better capitalised attempt to mine this deposit was begun in 1907 by the Missouri Iron Company, with a railroad connection built in 1910 and a new ore processing plant completed in 1913 with a capacity of 350 to 400 tons per day. The total investment was estimated at $225,000, and two patents were issued for the machinery in the ore processing plant. This mine became the principal mine of the new Mississippi Valley Iron Company of St. Louis, Missouri in 1916.

That year, the mine produced 10,151 tons of concentrated ore, and in 1917, it produced 22,612 tons. In 1918 the mine produced over 7000 tons before it was shut down because of World War I.

The mine never recovered from this shutdown, and the equipment was sold for scrap in 1937. Iron Mine Drive and Allamakee Street cross north of the sites of both old mines (43°17′53.62″N 91°27′35.85″W).

== Geography ==
The headwaters of the north branch of Paint Creek are in Waukon, and the town is just south of the headwaters of Village Creek. This is on the west edge of the deeply eroded Driftless Area of northeast Iowa. The town sits on a plain underlain by the Galena Limestone formation. There are many sinkholes in this plain south of Waukon. To the north, a tongue of Galena Limestone underlies Iron Hill.

According to the United States Census Bureau, the city has a total area of 2.82 square miles (7.30 km^{2}), all land.

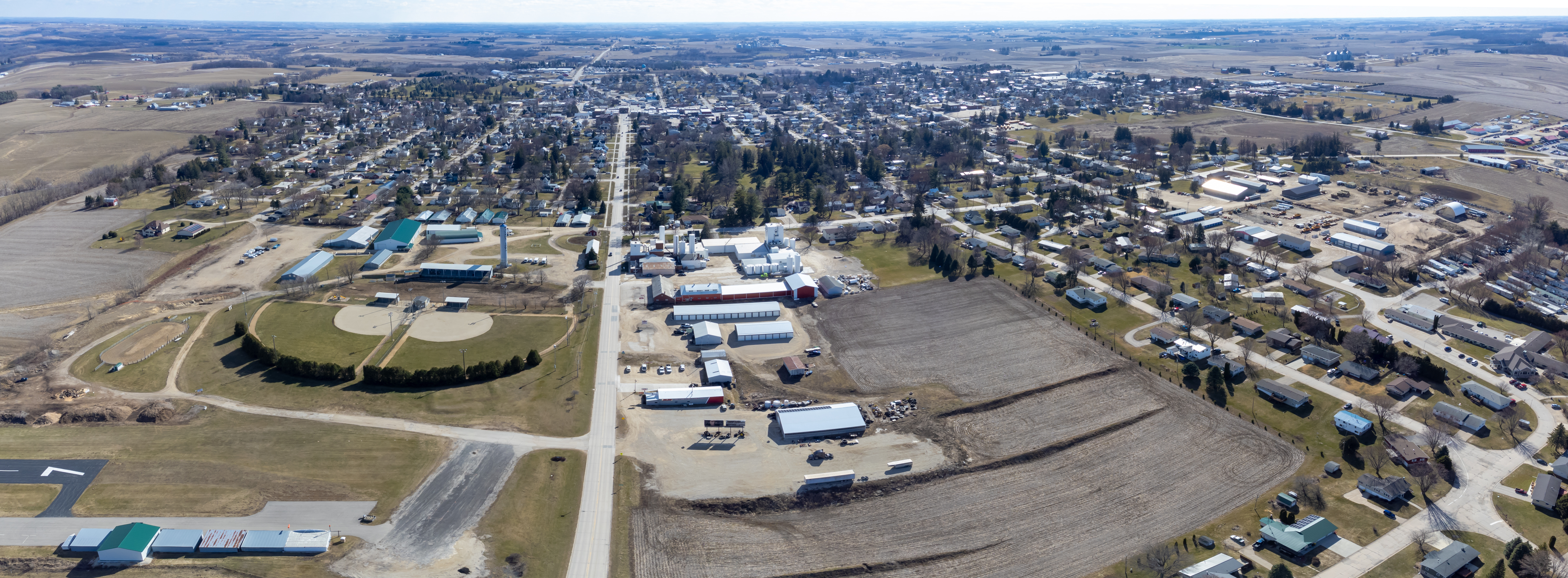
Iowa Highway 9 running through town

=== Climate ===
Climate data for Waukon, Iowa (1991–2020 normals, extremes 1934–present)
Month	Jan	Feb	Mar	Apr	May	Jun	Jul	Aug	Sep	Oct	Nov	Dec	Year
Record high °F (°C)	59 (15)	68 (20)	82 (28)	91 (33)	92 (33)	96 (36)	106 (41)	100 (38)	99 (37)	91 (33)	75 (24)	63 (17)	106 (41)
Mean maximum °F (°C)	43.0 (6.1)	47.5 (8.6)	66.9 (19.4)	79.0 (26.1)	85.1 (29.5)	90.3 (32.4)	91.1 (32.8)	89.9 (32.2)	86.3 (30.2)	80.8 (27.1)	62.7 (17.1)	47.8 (8.8)	92.9 (33.8)
Mean daily maximum °F (°C)	24.0 (−4.4)	29.0 (−1.7)	41.5 (5.3)	55.7 (13.2)	67.5 (19.7)	77.3 (25.2)	81.3 (27.4)	79.0 (26.1)	72.2 (22.3)	58.7 (14.8)	42.5 (5.8)	29.4 (−1.4)	54.8 (12.7)
Daily mean °F (°C)	16.2 (−8.8)	20.5 (−6.4)	32.2 (0.1)	45.0 (7.2)	56.6 (13.7)	67.5 (19.7)	71.5 (21.9)	69.1 (20.6)	61.4 (16.3)	48.7 (9.3)	34.5 (1.4)	22.2 (−5.4)	45.5 (7.5)
Mean daily minimum °F (°C)	8.4 (−13.1)	12.0 (−11.1)	22.8 (−5.1)	34.3 (1.3)	45.7 (7.6)	57.7 (14.3)	61.6 (16.4)	59.3 (15.2)	50.7 (10.4)	38.7 (3.7)	26.5 (−3.1)	15.0 (−9.4)	36.1 (2.3)
Mean minimum °F (°C)	−14.9 (−26.1)	−11.9 (−24.4)	4.2 (−15.4)	22.6 (−5.2)	31.7 (−0.2)	44.5 (6.9)	50.0 (10.0)	49.6 (9.8)	35.5 (1.9)	24.3 (−4.3)	8.2 (−13.2)	−5.6 (−20.9)	−18.2 (−27.9)
Record low °F (°C)	−31 (−35)	−34 (−37)	−21 (−29)	2 (−17)	24 (−4)	32 (0)	40 (4)	38 (3)	25 (−4)	15 (−9)	−13 (−25)	−27 (−33)	−34 (−37)
Average precipitation inches (mm)	1.23 (31)	1.25 (32)	2.03 (52)	4.06 (103)	4.66 (118)	5.92 (150)	4.73 (120)	4.70 (119)	3.92 (100)	2.85 (72)	2.27 (58)	1.57 (40)	39.19 (995)
Source: NOAA

== Demographics ==
Waukon historical population
Year	Pop.	±%
1880	1,350	—
1890	1,610	+19.3%
1900	2,153	+33.7%
1910	2,025	−5.9%
1920	2,359	+16.5%
1930	2,526	+7.1%
1940	2,972	+17.7%
1950	3,158	+6.3%
1960	3,639	+15.2%
1970	3,883	+6.7%
1980	3,983	+2.6%
1990	4,019	+0.9%
2000	4,131	+2.8%
2010	3,897	−5.7%
2020	3,827	−1.8%
Source: "U.S. Census website". United States Census Bureau. Source: U.S. Decennial Census

=== 2020 census ===
As of the 2020 census, Waukon had a population of 3,827. The population density was 1,349.4 inhabitants per square mile (521.0/km^{2}). The median age was 42.3 years. 22.2% of residents were under the age of 18 and 25.8% of residents were 65 years of age or older. For every 100 females there were 90.5 males, and for every 100 females age 18 and over there were 86.7 males age 18 and over.

0.0% of residents lived in urban areas, while 100.0% lived in rural areas.

There were 1,761 households in Waukon, of which 23.9% had children under the age of 18 living in them. Of all households, 39.9% were married-couple households, 21.1% were households with a male householder and no spouse or partner present, and 32.6% were households with a female householder and no spouse or partner present. About 42.3% of all households were made up of individuals and 21.1% had someone living alone who was 65 years of age or older.

There were 1,939 housing units at an average density of 683.7 per square mile (264.0/km^{2}), of which 9.2% were vacant. The homeowner vacancy rate was 2.0% and the rental vacancy rate was 6.7%.

Racial composition as of the 2020 census
Race	Number	Percent
White	3,655	95.5%
Black or African American	27	0.7%
American Indian and Alaska Native	11	0.3%
Asian	5	0.1%
Native Hawaiian and Other Pacific Islander	0	0.0%
Some other race	46	1.2%
Two or more races	83	2.2%
Hispanic or Latino (of any race)	103	2.7%

=== 2010 census ===
As of the census of 2010, there were 3,897 people, 1,781 households, and 1,008 families residing in the city. The population density was 1,381.9 inhabitants per square mile (533.6/km^{2}). There were 1,946 housing units at an average density of 690.1 per square mile (266.4/km^{2}). The racial makeup of the city was 98.4% White, 0.4% African American, 0.1% Native American, 0.1% Asian, 0.3% from other races, and 0.7% from two or more races. Hispanic or Latino of any race were 1.4% of the population.

There were 1,781 households, of which 24.3% had children under the age of 18 living with them, 43.0% were married couples living together, 9.4% had a female householder with no husband present, 4.2% had a male householder with no wife present, and 43.4% were non-families. 37.5% of all households were made up of individuals, and 18% had someone living alone who was 65 years of age or older. The average household size was 2.11 and the average family size was 2.77.

The median age in the city was 45.8 years. 20.4% of residents were under the age of 18; 7.9% were between the ages of 18 and 24; 20.7% were from 25 to 44; 27% were from 45 to 64; and 24% were 65 years of age or older. The gender makeup of the city was 46.6% male and 53.4% female.

=== 2000 census ===
As of the census of 2000, there were 4,131 people, 1,790 households, and 1,068 families residing in the city. The population density was 1,404.3 inhabitants per square mile (542.2/km^{2}). There were 1,909 housing units at an average density of 649.0 per square mile (250.6/km^{2}). The racial makeup of the city was 98.74% White, 0.10% Native American, 0.22% Asian, 0.02% Pacific Islander, 0.15% from other races, and 0.77% from two or more races. Hispanic or Latino of any race were 0.73% of the population.

There were 1,790 households, out of which 26.6% had children under the age of 18 living with them, 47.5% were married couples living together, 9.4% had a female householder with no husband present, and 40.3% were non-families. 36.5% of all households were made up of individuals, and 20.3% had someone living alone who was 65 years of age or older. The average household size was 2.21 and the average family size was 2.89.

Age spread: 22.8% under the age of 18, 7.6% from 18 to 24, 23.3% from 25 to 44, 21.7% from 45 to 64, and 24.6% who were 65 years of age or older. The median age was 42 years. For every 100 females, there were 84.3 males. For every 100 females age 18 and over, there were 81.4 males.

The median income for a household in the city was $30,325, and the median income for a family was $41,068. Males had a median income of $27,532 versus $18,833 for females. The per capita income for the city was $17,047. About 8.3% of families and 12.3% of the population were below the poverty line, including 19.7% of those under age 18 and 6.8% of those age 65 or over.

== Parks and recreation ==
Waukon Family Aquatic Area: The aquatic pool is the main attraction in Waukon's park. Also in the park is a small area with a lake, as well as some playgrounds. The park also includes a campground and some softball/athletic fields.

== Education ==
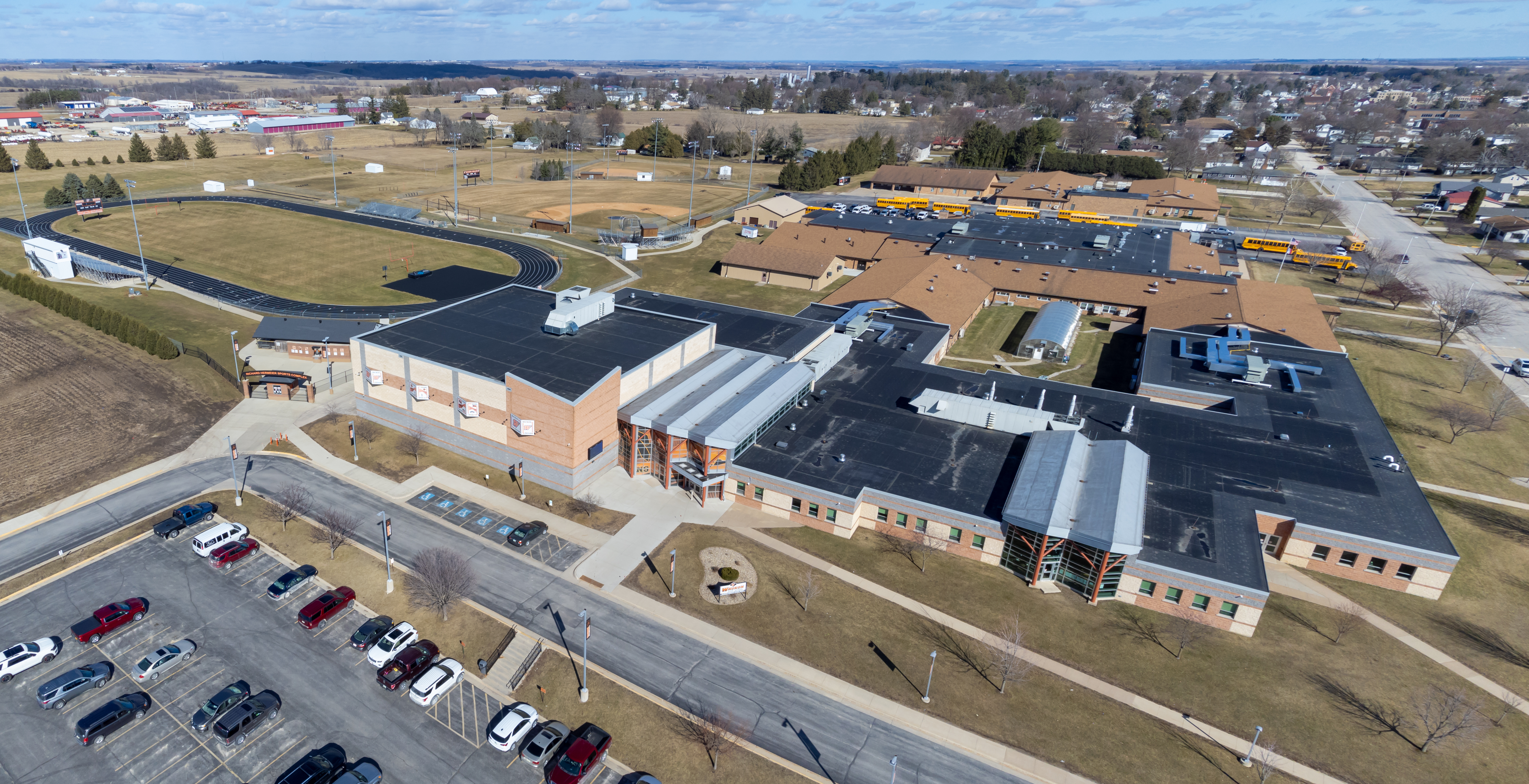
Waukon high school, middle, and elementary school

The Allamakee Community School District operates local public schools, which include two elementary schools, a middle school, and Waukon High School. A Catholic-church-affiliated private elementary school also operates in Waukon.

== Media ==
=== Newspaper ===
Waukon Standard

=== Radio ===
- KNEI-FM 103.5 Bluff Country
- K256CS 99.1 The River

== Notable people ==
- Dudley W. Adams, horticulturalist who led the granger movement
- Mark Farley, head football coach at the University of Northern Iowa
- Bess Goodykoontz, educator and federal official
- Gregory D. Hager, famous professor at the Johns Hopkins University
- Isaiah H. Hedge, MD, abolitionist, early donor to Bates College, physician
- Parker Hesse, professional football player and former player for University of Iowa
- Levi M. Hubbell, politician and businessman
- Hugh Kidder, officer in the United States Marine Corps during World War II
- Edward P. Ney, famous professor at the University of Minnesota
- Cletus F. O'Donnell, second Roman Catholic bishop of the Roman Catholic Diocese of Madison
- Michael Osterholm, public-health scientist and biosecurity and infectious-disease expert
- Joseph Taggart, member of the U.S. House of Representatives
