= French Creek Township =

French Creek Township may refer to the following townships in the United States:

- French Creek Township, Allamakee County, Iowa
- French Creek Township, Mercer County, Pennsylvania
- French Creek Township, Venango County, Pennsylvania
