= Taylor Township, Allamakee County, Iowa =

Township in Iowa, US

Taylor Township, Allamakee County
- Township
- Coordinates: 43°12′38″N 091°10′31″W
- Country: United States
- State: Iowa
- County: Allamakee

Area
  - Total: 49.75 sq mi (128.86 km^{2})
  - Land: 41.66 sq mi (107.91 km^{2})
  - Water: 8.09 sq mi (20.95 km^{2})
- Elevation: 978 ft (298 m)

Population (2010)
  - Total: 662
  - Density: 16/sq mi (6.1/km^{2})
- Time zone: UTC-6 (CST)
  - Summer (DST): UTC-5 (CDT)
- FIPS code: 19-94089
- GNIS feature ID: 0468781

Taylor Township is one of eighteen townships in Allamakee County, Iowa, USA. At the 2010 census, its population was 662.

== History ==
Taylor Township was organized in 1851.

== Geography ==
Taylor Township covers an area of 49.75 square miles (128.9 km^{2}) and contains one settlement, Harpers Ferry. According to the USGS, it contains one cemetery, Harpers Ferry.
