= Fairview Township, Allamakee County, Iowa =

Township in Iowa, US

Fairview Township, Allamakee County
- Township
- Coordinates: 43°07′25″N 091°14′09″W
- Country: United States
- State: Iowa
- County: Allamakee

Area
  - Total: 25.56 sq mi (66.21 km^{2})
  - Land: 24.25 sq mi (62.81 km^{2})
  - Water: 1.3 sq mi (3.4 km^{2})
- Elevation: 883 ft (269 m)

Population (2010)
  - Total: 240
  - Density: 9.8/sq mi (3.8/km^{2})
- Time zone: UTC-6 (CST)
  - Summer (DST): UTC-5 (CDT)
- FIPS code: 19-91290
- GNIS feature ID: 0467815

Fairview Township is one of eighteen townships in Allamakee County, Iowa, USA. At the 2010 census, its population was 240.

== History ==
Fairview Township was organized in 1855.

== Geography ==
Fairview Township covers an area of 25.56 square miles (66.2 km^{2}) and contains no incorporated settlements. According to the USGS, it contains three cemeteries: Grover Plot, Ion Methodist and Spaulding.
