= Gregory D. Hager =

American computer scientist

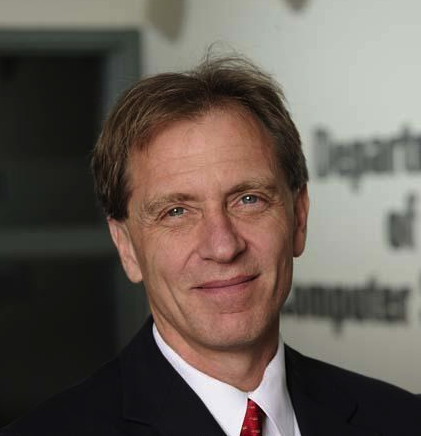
- Born: May 9, 1961 (age 65); Waukon, Iowa
- Education: University of Pennsylvania, Luther College
- Known for: Vision-based robotics, computer vision, human-machine collaborative systems, computer-integrated medicine
- Title: Mandell Bellmore Professor of Computer Science
- Awards: AAAS Fellow, ACM Fellow, IEEE Fellow, MICCAI Fellow, AIMBE Fellow, Hans Fischer Fellow, TUM Ambassador, Kuka Innovation Award
- Scientific career
- Fields: Computer Vision, Robotics, Medical Imaging, Computer-Integrated Medicine
- Workplaces: Johns Hopkins University, Yale University, Technical University of Munich
- Website: cs.jhu.edu/hager

Gregory D. Hager (born May 9, 1961) is the Mandell Bellmore Professor of Computer Science and founding director of the Johns Hopkins Malone Center for Engineering in Healthcare at Johns Hopkins University.

His principal areas of research are collaborative and vision-based robotics, time-series analysis of image data, and medical applications of image analysis and robotics. Hager develops real-time computer vision algorithms for robotic systems. His work offers novel applications for automated surgical training, medical imaging and diagnostics, and computer-enhanced interventional medicine.

== Early life and education ==
Hager was born in Waukon, Iowa. He graduated summa cum laude from Luther College in 1983. Hager went on to earn a master's degree (1985) and Ph.D. (1988) from University of Pennsylvania, under the guidance of advisors Dr. Dale Miller and Dr. Max Mintz, respectively. He received the Rubinoff Dissertation Prize for his PhD Thesis entitled "Active Reduction of Uncertainty in Multi-Sensor Systems."

== Career and research ==
Immediately following his PhD, Hager was a Fulbright Fellow at the University of Karlsruhe (1988–90), and was on the faculty at Yale University prior to joining Johns Hopkins in 1999.

At Johns Hopkins, Hager is the Mandell Bellmore Professor in the Department of Computer Science. He also holds joint appointments in the Department of Electrical and Computer Engineering, the Department of Mechanical Engineering, and Surgery. From 2010 - 2015, he served as Chair of the Department of Computer Science. In 2016, Hager became the founding director of the Johns Hopkins Malone Center for Engineering in Healthcare, a multidisciplinary research center aimed at driving engineering innovations in healthcare.

His laboratory, the Computational Interaction and Robotics Lab (CIRL), studies problems that involve dynamic, spatial interaction at the intersection of imaging, robotics, and human-computer interaction.

Hager has made many highly cited contributions to computer vision and robotics. His early work focused on visual tracking and vision-based control for manipulation. Together with Seth Hutchinson and Peter Corke, he authored a tutorial on vision-based motion control for robotics which continues to be one of the most highly cited articles published in the IEEE Transactions on Robotics.

In addition to vision-based control, Hager has also published influential articles on visual tracking, pose estimation from images, and collaborative control.

In the area of medicine, Hager is known for pioneering work on the "language of surgery" which seeks to model surgical procedures and evaluate surgical skill from recorded operative data.

He has numerous publications in other areas, including ultrasound elastography, activity recognition from video images, vision-based navigation, 3D reconstruction from images, and robot motion planning,

Hager's many contributions to the field of vision-based robotics has earned him status as an IEEE Fellow. Additionally, he has been named a Fellow of the MICCAI Society, the Association for Computing Machinery (ACM), the American Institute for Medical and Biological Engineering (AIMBE), and the American Association for the Advancement of Science (AAAS).

In 2014, he was awarded a Hans Fischer Fellowship at the Technical University of Munich's Institute of Advanced Study.

In 2024, he joined the National Science Foundation as Assistant Director of the Directorate for Computer and Information Science and Engineering. In May 2025 the Computing Research Association posted that Hager had resigned from his role as NSF Assistant Director for the CISE Directorate. His letter cited Presidential cuts to NSF’s budget and limits on NSF’s activities as diminishing his ability to show leadership in the role or for the community.

== Service ==
Hager has served on numerous prominent review committees and panels. Together with Susan Graham, he co-chaired the 2015 Review of the Networking and Information Technology Research and Development program (NITRD) and provided congressional testimony on the report. He was a member of the inaugural "100 Year Study on Artificial Intelligence"; a roundtable on AI and foreign policy held by the National Academies of Science, Engineering, and Medicine; and a panel at the 2018 AAAS annual meeting on "Artificial Intelligence: Augmenting Not Replacing People". He is a member of the National Science Foundation's Computer and Information Science and Engineering (CISE) advisory committee, a member of the governing board of the International Federation of Robotics Research, and a past board member of the Computing Research Association. Hager is the past chair of the Computing Community Consortium, where he led multiple initiatives for the computing research community, including the BRAIN initiative, AI for Social Good, and Industry-Academic Relations.

Hager has served on the organizing committee for several major conferences including ICCV 2015 (General Chair), CVPR 2013 (Program Chair), ISRR 2017 (General Chair). He has served as associate editor for the International Journal of Computer Vision, the International Journal of Robotics Research, the Transactions on Robotics, and the ACM Transactions on Computing for Healthcare.

== Private sector ==
Hager is a co-founder of two startups: Clear Guide Medical, whose platform enables doctors and technicians to perform more accurate ultrasound-guided procedures, and Ready Robotics, dedicated to making industrial robots easier to use. He has served as technical advisor to two others - Theater.io which develops systems for video-based analysis of surgery, and Ikona medical which developed software for enhanced capsule endoscopy review. From September 2022 to May 2024 Hager was on leave from Johns Hopkins to serve as Director of Applied Science for Amazon Just Walk Out Technologies and the Amazon Dash Cart and subsequently leading technical development for Amazon Robotics.

== Awards and honors ==
- 2019: Fellow of the AAAS
- 2018: Fellow of the ACM
- 2017: TUM Ambassador
- 2017: Fellow of AIMBE
- 2016: KUKA Innovation Award
- 2015: Fellow of the MICCAI Society
- 2014: Hans Fischer Fellow, Institute for Advanced Studies, Technical University of Munich
- 2013: Distinguished Alumni Award, Luther College
- 2006: Fellow of the IEEE
