= Lycurgus, Iowa =

- Unincorporated community
- Location within Iowa
- Coordinates: 43°19′52″N 91°25′26″W
- Country: United States
- State: Iowa
- County: Allamakee
- Elevation: 1,270 ft (390 m)
- Time zone: UTC-6 (Central (CST))
  - Summer (DST): UTC-5 (CDT)
- Area code: 563
- GNIS feature ID: 464636

Lycurgus is a rural unincorporated community in Allamakee County, Iowa, United States.

== History ==
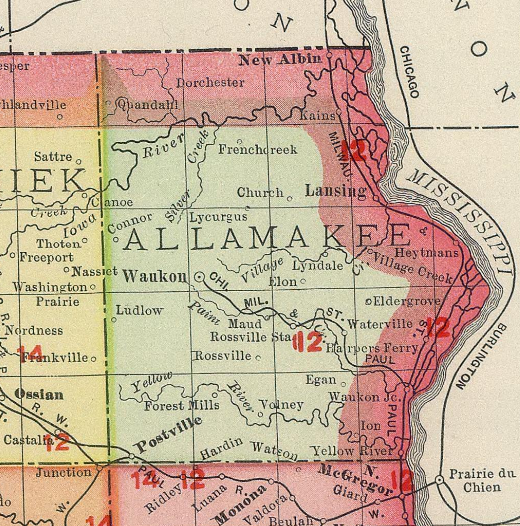
Lycurgus is shown in Allamakee County, Iowa, circa 1903.

The first settler in the Lycurgus area was a Mexican War veteran in 1851. In the 1860s, a hotel and store were located in the area.

The first post office in Lycurgus was established circa 1852. It was moved to a hotel/store in 1868. A school was built, of native stone, in 1868. The school operated until consolidation took place in the 1960s.

The area also has long had a Catholic church, dating back to approximately 1860. The church grounds also included a rectory, cemetery, and parish hall. The church was remodeled and enlarged in 1885. In 2006, the church was closed and made an oratory.

Gradually, the Lycurgus area emptied. Lycurgus' population, in 1902, was just 12; in 1925, the population was 52. The population was 6 in 1940.
