= Linton Township, Allamakee County, Iowa =

Township in Iowa, US

Linton Township, Allamakee County
- Township
- Coordinates: 43°07′36″N 091°18′56″W
- Country: United States
- State: Iowa
- County: Allamakee

Area
  - Total: 31.55 sq mi (81.72 km^{2})
  - Land: 31.55 sq mi (81.72 km^{2})
  - Water: 0 sq mi (0 km^{2})
- Elevation: 748 ft (228 m)

Population (2010)
  - Total: 305
  - Density: 9.6/sq mi (3.7/km^{2})
- Time zone: UTC-6 (CST)
  - Summer (DST): UTC-5 (CDT)
- FIPS code: 19-92655
- GNIS feature ID: 0468284

Linton Township is one of eighteen townships in Allamakee County, Iowa, USA. At the 2010 census, its population was 305.

== History ==
Linton Township was organized in 1851.

== Geography ==
Linton Township covers an area of 31.55 square miles (81.7 km^{2}) and contains no incorporated settlements. According to the USGS, it contains two cemeteries: Cherry Mound and Sixteen.
