= Cota Creek =

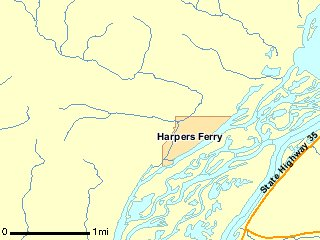
- Cota Creek vicinity

Location
- Country: United States
- State: Iowa
- District: Allamakee County
- City: Harper's Ferry

Physical characteristics
- Source
  - location: IA, US
  - coordinates: 43°15′33″N 91°13′21″W
- Mouth
  - location: IA, US
  - coordinates: 43°11′33″N 91°09′30″W
- Discharge
  - location: Mississippi River

Cota Creek is a minor tributary of the Upper Mississippi River. It is confined mainly to Taylor Township in Allamakee County, Iowa, United States. It joins the river at Harpers Ferry, downstream from Lock and Dam No. 9.

== See also ==
- List of rivers of Iowa
