= Maud, Iowa =

- Unincorporated community
- Location within Iowa Location within the United States
- Country: United States
- State: Iowa
- County: Allamakee
- Elevation: 942 ft (287 m)
- Time zone: UTC-6 (Central (CST))
  - Summer (DST): UTC-5 (CDT)
- Area code: 563
- GNIS feature ID: 464646

Maud is an unincorporated community in Allamakee County, Iowa, United States.

== History ==
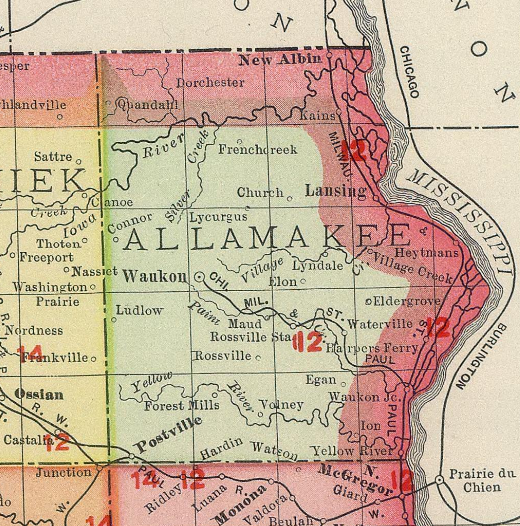
Maud in Allamakee County, Iowa, in 1903

Maud got its start as a way station on the railroad. Maud's population was 12 in 1902, and was also 12 in 1925. The population was also 12 in 1940. The Maud Post office operated from 1897 to 1917.
