= Bess Goodykoontz =

American educator

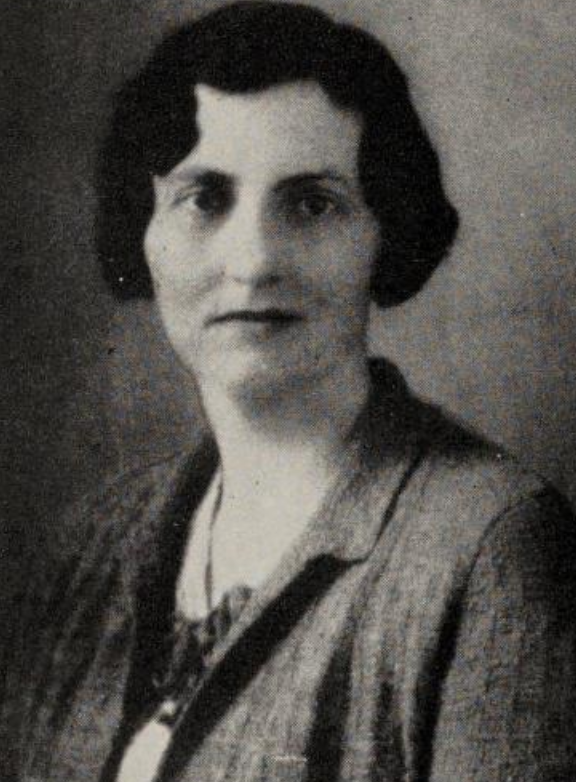
- Bess Goodykoontz from a 1935 publication of the US Department of the Interior
- Born: August 21, 1894; Waukon, Iowa, U.S.
- Died: July 29, 1990 (aged 95); South Newfane, Vermont, U.S.
- Occupation(s): Educator, federal official

Bess Goodykoontz (August 21, 1894 – July 29, 1990) was an American educator and federal official. She was assistant US Commissioner of Education from 1929 to 1945.

== Early life and education ==
Goodykoontz was born in Waukon, Iowa, the daughter of Edward Warren Goodykoontz and Lela Sherman Goodykoontz. She earned bachelor's and master's degrees at the University of Iowa, in 1920 and 1922. She was a member of Delta Zeta sorority.

== Career ==
Goodykoontz taught school in Iowa and Wisconsin. She was an assistant professor of education at the University of Pittsburgh in the 1920s. She was assistant US Commissioner of Education from 1929 to 1946. From 1933 to 1937, she was president of Pi Lambda Theta. During the 1930s, much of her attention was focused on vocational education; she also encouraged the use of motion pictures in educational settings, and testified before a 1933 Senate hearing on teacher salaries. During World War II, she testified before a 1943 Senate hearing on childcare programs to meet the needs of working mothers. She frequently spoke at college commencement exercises and teachers' conventions.

After World War II, Goodykoontz was part of the rebuilding effort in Germany. She was director of the elementary education division from 1946 to 1949. In 1950, she was named Associate Commissioner of Education. From 1951 to 1956, she was director of the comparative education division. In 1956, she became director of the international education division. She was president of the World Organization for Early Childhood Education. In 1959 she was named Woman of the Year by Delta Zeta. She retired from the Office of Education in 1960.

== Publications ==
Goodykoontz wrote many articles for scholarly and professional journals, including Childhood Education, The Elementary English Review, Teachers College Record, Bulletin of the American Library Association, Hispania, Pi Lambda Theta Journal, and National Altrusan. She also created publications for the Office of Education, including The Elementary School Principalship: Some Aspects of Its Development and Status (1938, with Jessie A. Lane) and Know Your Community as a Basis for Understanding the Schools Problems (1941).

- "Teaching Pupils to Organize What They Read" (1930)
- "Pan-Pacific Women's Organization" (1931)
- "Some Factors Affecting the Elementary English Curriculum" (1931)
- "The Relation of Pictures to Reading Comprehension" (1936)
- "A Bibliography of Unpublished Studies in Elementary School English, 1934-1936" (1937)
- "Propaganda: What It Is; How It Works; What to Do About It" (1938)
- The Elementary School Principalship: Some Aspects of Its Development and Status (1938, with Jessie A. Lane)
- Know Your Community as a Basis for Understanding the Schools Problems (1941)
- "The Importance of Education for Family Life at the Various School Levels" (1941)
- "Challenges to the Present Structure of American Education" (1945)
- "Why Education for Inter-American Understanding?" (1945)
- "Changes Needed in School Organization to Provide for Special Groups" (1945)
- "The Elementary School of Tomorrow — Its Possible Structure" (1946)
- "Hobbies Extend Horizons, Too" (1952)
- "Selected Studies Relating to Community Schools" (1953)
- "Children's Needs Throughout the World" (1955)
- Basic Human Values for Childhood Education (1962)

== Personal life ==
Goodykoontz adopted a daughter, Ellen Darrow. She died in 1990, aged 95 years, at her daughter's home in South Newfane, Vermont. Her papers are in the Hoover Library,
