= Duck Lake (Iowa) =

Lake in Iowa, United States

- Location within Iowa
- Location: Allamakee County, near New Albin, Iowa
- Coordinates: 43°28′30.3″N 91°15′13.1″W
- Primary inflows: Upper Mississippi River, Upper Iowa River
- Primary outflows: Upper Mississippi River
- Catchment area: Upper Mississippi River
- Basin countries: United States

EPA map

Duck Lake is a small lake in the wetlands on the western shore of the Upper Mississippi River, just north of Lansing, Iowa, in northeastern Allamakee County. It is a part of the New Albin-Big Lake Wildlife Management Area, which itself is surrounded by the Upper Mississippi River National Wildlife and Fish Refuge. It is connected to the Upper Iowa River, but leaks directly to the Big River itself.

== Sources ==
- TopoZone
- cLocations
