= Church, Iowa =

- Unincorporated community
- Location within Iowa
- Coordinates: 43°21′08″N 91°20′20″W
- Country: United States
- State: Iowa
- County: Allamakee
- Elevation: 1,263 ft (385 m)
- Time zone: UTC-6 (Central (CST))
  - Summer (DST): UTC-5 (CDT)
- Area code: 563
- GNIS feature ID: 455410

Church (also Church Village, Churchtown) is an unincorporated community in Allamakee County, Iowa, United States.

== History ==
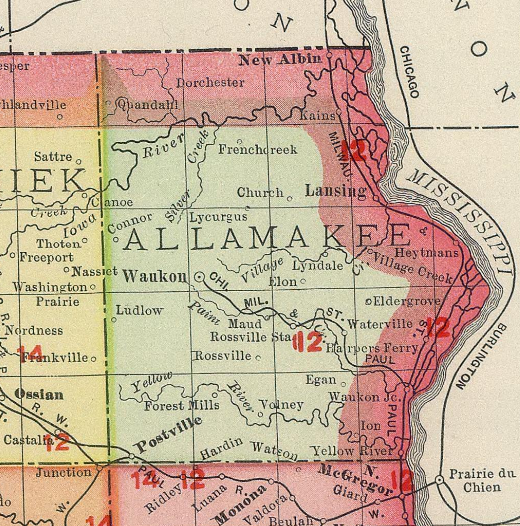
Church in Allamakee County, Iowa, in 1903

Church was incorporated in 1896.

It had a post office and telephone office for many years. A creamery also used to operate in the town.

Church's population was 25 in 1925. The population was 40 in 1940.
