= Rossville, Iowa =

- Unincorporated community
- Location within Iowa
- Coordinates: 43°11′22″N 91°22′32″W
- Country: United States
- State: Iowa
- County: Allamakee
- Elevation: 1,175 ft (358 m)
- Time zone: UTC-6 (Central (CST))
  - Summer (DST): UTC-5 (CDT)
- Area code: 563
- GNIS feature ID: 460817

Rossville is an unincorporated community in Allamakee County, Iowa, United States.

== History ==
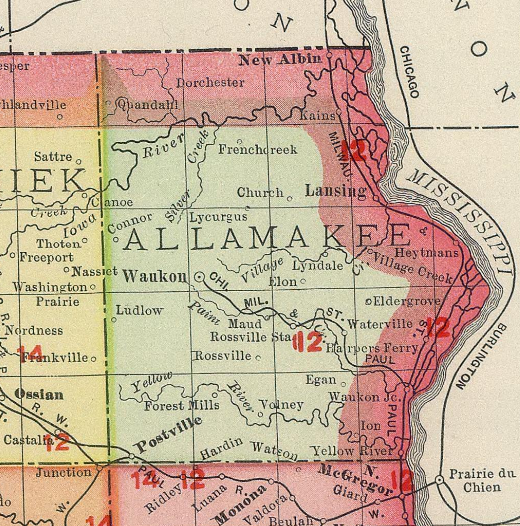
Rossville Station in Allamakee County, Iowa, in 1903

Rossville was platted in 1855. It is named for William F. Ross, said to be the first settler on the townsite in 1850. By the 1880s, Rossville contained three churches, a schoolhouse, hotel, and two stores. The population was estimated at 100 in 1940.
