= Harpers Ferry, Iowa =

- City
- City of Harpers Ferry
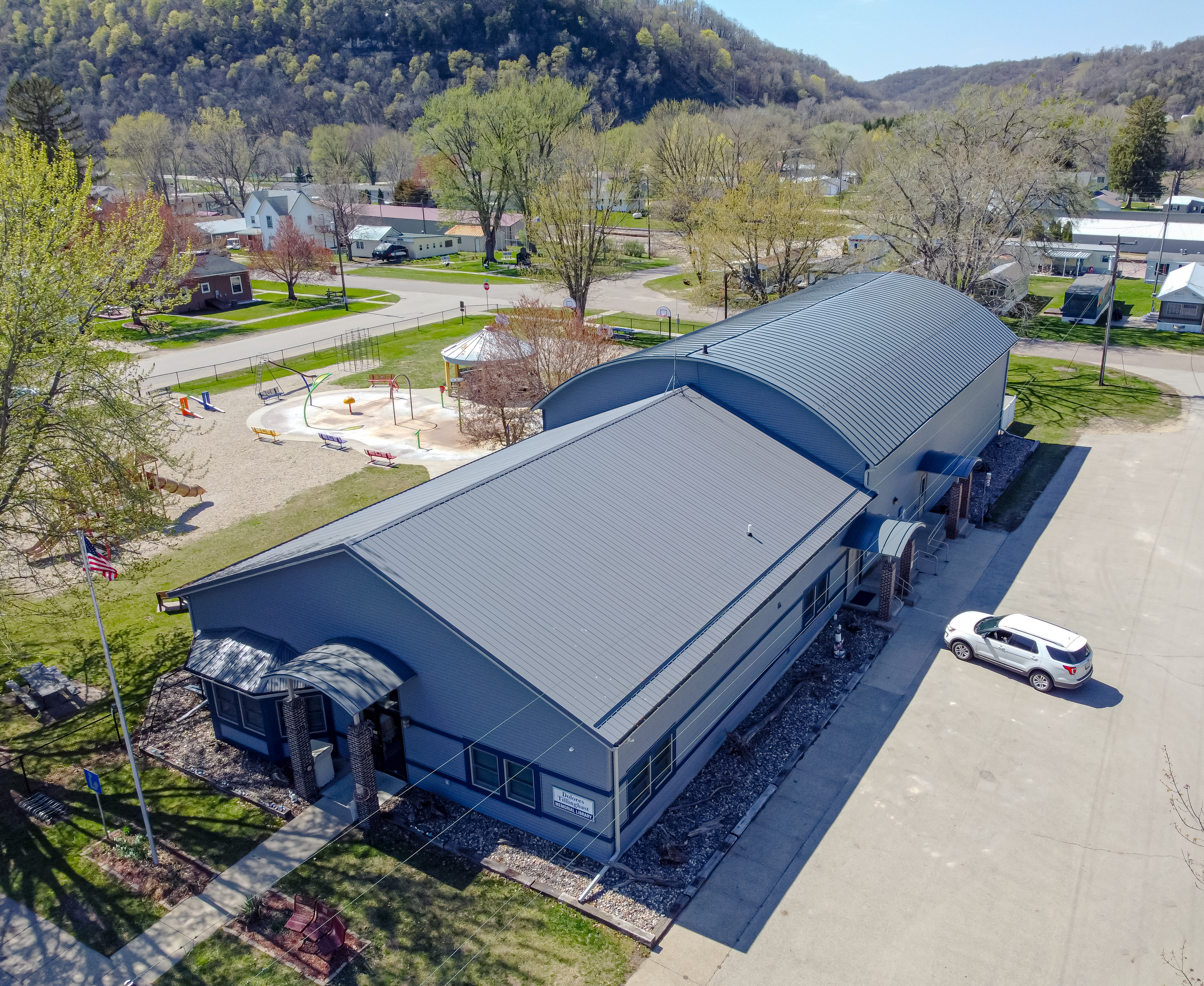
- City hall and library

- Location of Harpers Ferry, Iowa
- Coordinates: 43°12′03″N 91°09′08″W
- Country: United States
- State: Iowa
- County: Allamakee
- Township: Taylor
- Platted: 1852
- Incorporated: December 24, 1901
- Named after: David Harper

Area
  - Total: 0.66 sq mi (1.72 km^{2})
  - Land: 0.64 sq mi (1.67 km^{2})
  - Water: 0.019 sq mi (0.05 km^{2})
- Elevation: 650 ft (200 m)

Population (2020)
  - Total: 262
  - Density: 406.1/sq mi (156.79/km^{2})
- Time zone: UTC-6 (Central (CST))
  - Summer (DST): UTC-5 (CDT)
- ZIP code: 52146
- Area code: 563
- FIPS code: 19-34590
- GNIS feature ID: 2394301
- Website: harpersferryiowa.com

Harpers Ferry is a city in Taylor Township, Allamakee County, Iowa, United States. The population was 262 at the time of the 2020 census.

== History ==
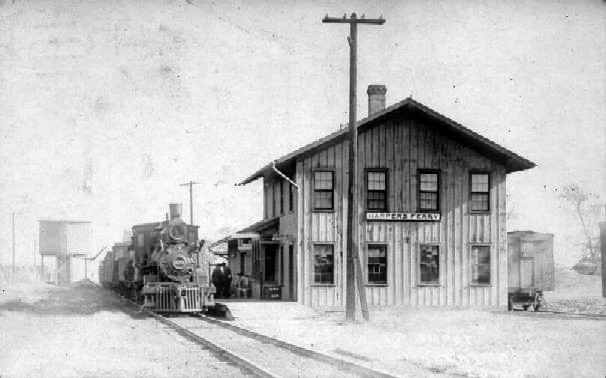
Train depot in Harpers Ferry, circa 1913

Harpers Ferry was platted in 1852; it was then called Winfield. In 1860, the name was changed to Harper's Ferry (with an apostrophe-s) after primary settler David Harper. On December 24, 1901, Harpers Ferry was officially incorporated.

== Geography ==
According to the United States Census Bureau, the city has a total area of 0.65 square miles (1.68 km^{2}), of which 0.63 square miles (1.63 km^{2}) is land and 0.02 square miles (0.05 km^{2}) is water.

== Demographics ==
Historical populations
Year	Pop.	±%
1910	297	—
1920	328	+10.4%
1930	289	−11.9%
1940	361	+24.9%
1950	252	−30.2%
1960	211	−16.3%
1970	227	+7.6%
1980	258	+13.7%
1990	284	+10.1%
2000	330	+16.2%
2010	328	−0.6%
2020	262	−20.1%
Source:"U.S. Census website". United States Census Bureau. and Iowa Data Center; Source: U.S. Decennial Census

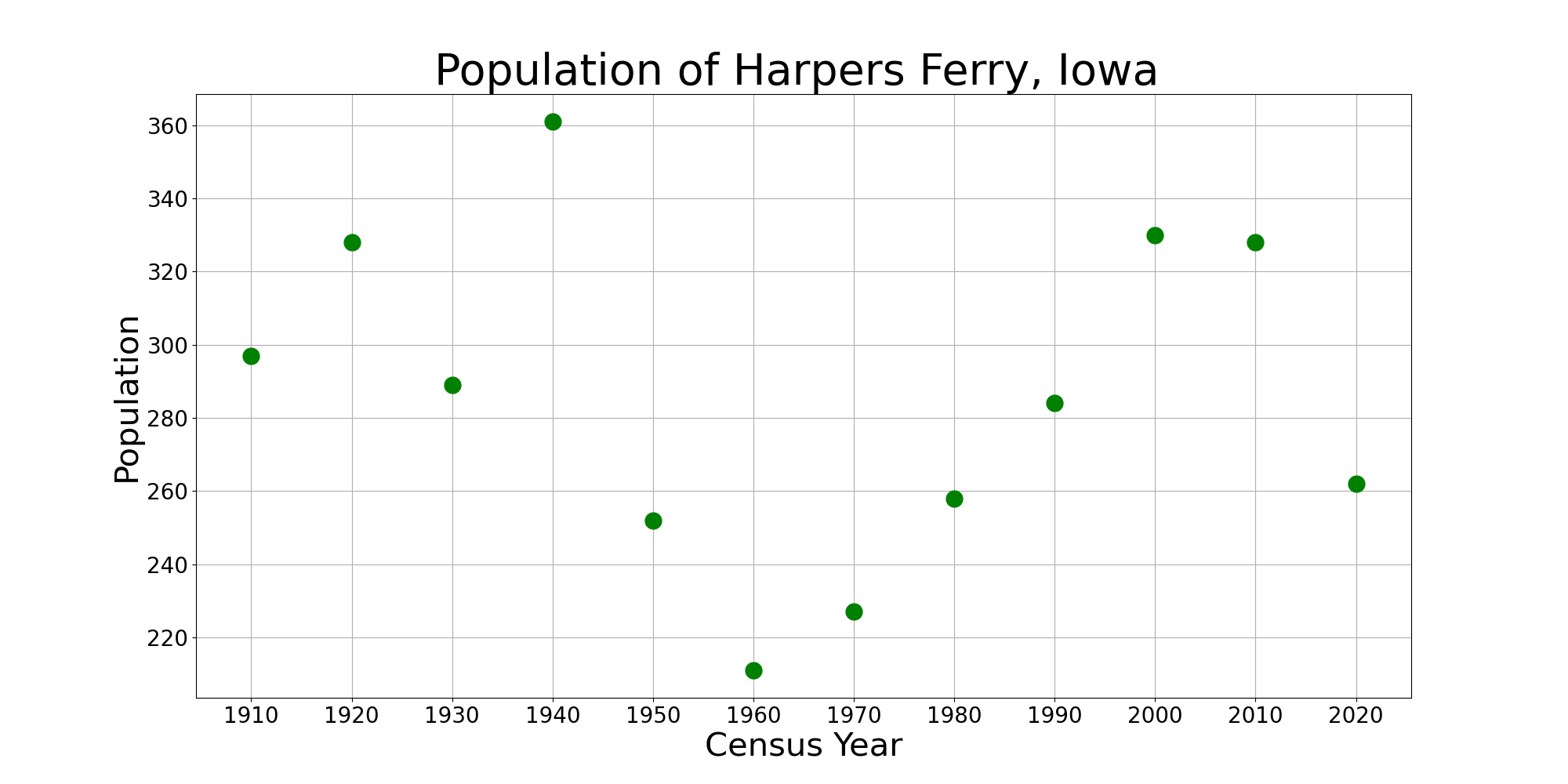
The population of Harpers Ferry, Iowa from US census data

=== 2020 census ===
As of the census of 2020, there were 262 people, 148 households, and 91 families residing in the city. The population density was 406.8 inhabitants per square mile (157.0/km^{2}). There were 575 housing units at an average density of 892.7 per square mile (344.7/km^{2}). The racial makeup of the city was 98.5% White, 0.0% Black or African American, 0.0% Native American, 1.1% Asian, 0.0% Pacific Islander, 0.0% from other races and 0.4% from two or more races. Hispanic or Latino persons of any race comprised 0.0% of the population.

Of the 148 households, 10.1% of which had children under the age of 18 living with them, 52.0% were married couples living together, 8.1% were cohabitating couples, 23.6% had a female householder with no spouse or partner present and 16.2% had a male householder with no spouse or partner present. 38.5% of all households were non-families. 33.1% of all households were made up of individuals, 19.6% had someone living alone who was 65 years old or older.

The median age in the city was 66.4 years. 7.6% of the residents were under the age of 20; 2.7% were between the ages of 20 and 24; 6.9% were from 25 and 44; 28.6% were from 45 and 64; and 54.2% were 65 years of age or older. The gender makeup of the city was 51.1% male and 48.9% female.

=== 2010 census ===
As of the 2010 census, there were 328 people, 173 households, and 106 families living in the city. The population density was 520.6 inhabitants per square mile (201.0/km^{2}). There were 578 housing units at an average density of 917.5 per square mile (354.2/km^{2}). The racial makeup of the city was 99.7% White and 0.3% African American.

There were 173 households, of which 13.3% had children under the age of 18 living with them, 57.8% were married couples living together, 2.3% had a female householder with no husband present, 1.2% had a male householder with no wife present, and 38.7% were non-families. 32.9% of all households were made up of individuals, and 19% had someone living alone who was 65 years of age or older. The average household size was 1.90 and the average family size was 2.33.

The median age in the city was 58.8 years. 10.7% of residents were under the age of 18; 4.5% were between the ages of 18 and 24; 10% were from 25 to 44; 40.8% were from 45 to 64; and 33.8% were 65 years of age or older. The gender makeup of the city was 51.2% male and 48.8% female.

=== 2000 census ===
As of the 2000 census, there were 330 people, 166 households, and 110 families living in the city. The population density was 539.7 inhabitants per square mile (208.4/km^{2}). There were 560 housing units at an average density of 915.9 per square mile (353.6/km^{2}). The racial makeup of the city was 98.18% White, 1.21% Native American, and 0.61% from two or more races. Hispanic or Latino of any race were 0.30% of the population.

There were 166 households, out of which 15.7% had children under the age of 18 living with them, 57.8% were married couples living together, 6.0% had a female householder with no husband present, and 33.7% were non-families. 31.9% of all households were made up of individuals, and 22.3% had someone living alone who was 65 years of age or older. The average household size was 1.99 and the average family size was 2.44.

14.8% are under the age of 18, 1.8% are between 18 and 24, 18.8% are between 25 and 44, 28.2% are between 45 and 64, and 36.4% are 65 years of age or older. The median age was 58 years. For every 100 females, there were 90.8 males. For every 100 females aged 18 and over, there were 83.7 males aged 18 and over.

The median income for a household in the city was $29,091, and the median income for a family was $35,125. Males had a median income of $30,000 versus $21,250 for females. The per capita income for the city was $17,566. About 3.5% of families and 7.5% of the population were below the poverty threshold, including 24.4% of those under age 18 and 1.8% of those age 65 or over.

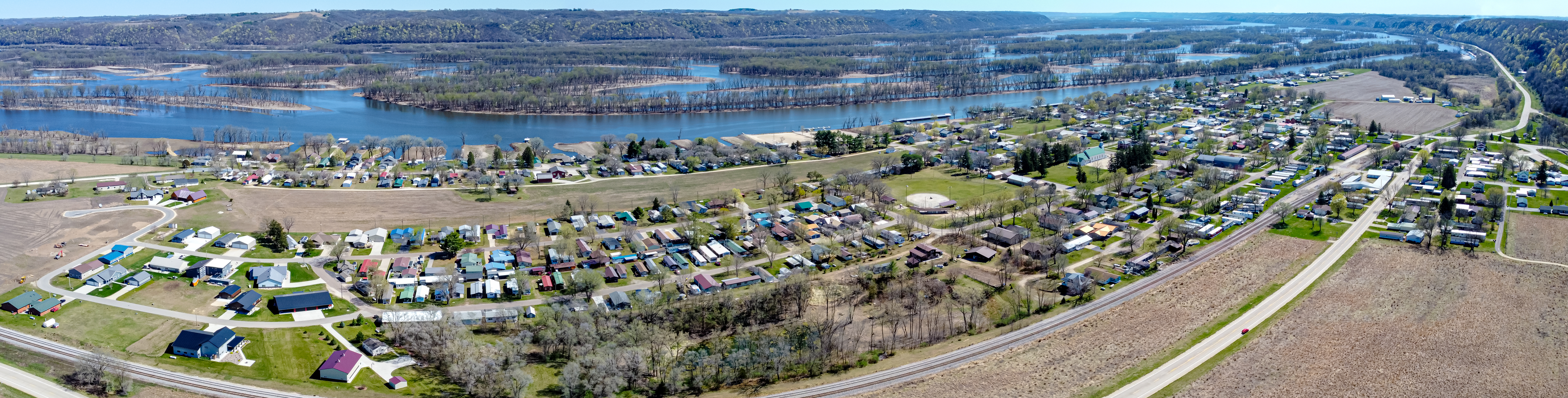

== Transportation ==
Passenger train service was provided to Harpers Ferry throughout its early history. Trains ran from La Crosse along the west bank of the Mississippi River through Harpers Ferry to Dubuque. This service gradually decreased in the first half of the twentieth century and was discontinued on June 8, 1951.

== See also ==
- Cota Creek
