= Waukon Standard =

The Standard
- Type: Weekly newspaper
- Editor: Jeremy Troendle
- Founded: 1868
- Headquarters: Waukon, Iowa
- Website: waukonstandard.com

The Standard, formerly the Waukon Standard is the local paper in Waukon, Iowa and Lansing, Iowa. It, along with the Postville Herald, cover all the top stories in NE Iowa. Each paper cost $1.25 to purchase. Each paper includes sections from education, to agriculture, to viewpoints of local residents.
