= Ion, Iowa =

- Unincorporated community
- Location within Iowa
- Coordinates: 43°06′46″N 91°15′43″W
- Country: United States
- State: Iowa
- County: Allamakee
- Elevation: 679 ft (207 m)
- Time zone: UTC-6 (Central (CST))
  - Summer (DST): UTC-5 (CDT)
- Area code: 563
- GNIS feature ID: 464590

Ion is an unincorporated community in Allamakee County, Iowa, United States.

== History ==
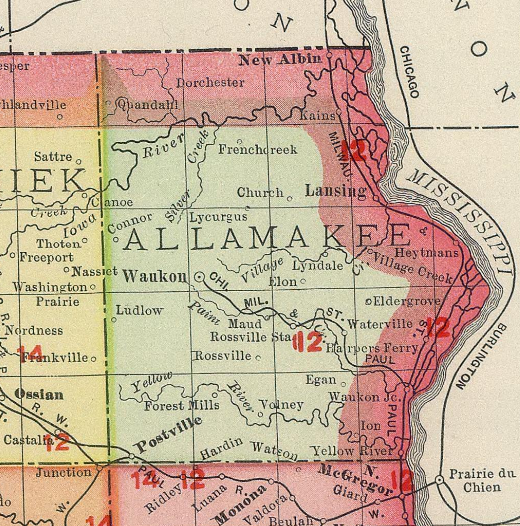
Ion in Allamakee County, Iowa, in 1903

Ion was platted in 1855 and was named after a character in a novel, one of the settlers had recently read. Ion's population was 52 in 1902.
