= Village Creek, Iowa =

- Unincorporated community
- Location within Iowa
- Coordinates: 43°18′33″N 91°14′06″W
- Country: United States
- State: Iowa
- County: Allamakee
- Elevation: 656 ft (200 m)
- Time zone: UTC-6 (Central (CST))
  - Summer (DST): UTC-5 (CDT)
- Area code: 563
- GNIS feature ID: 464786

Village Creek is an unincorporated community in Allamakee County, Iowa, United States.

== History ==
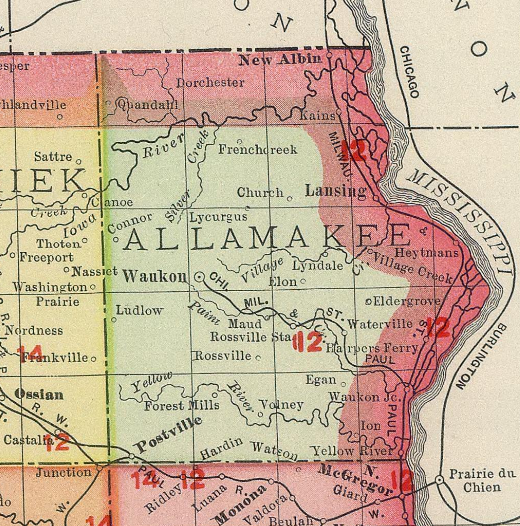
Village Creek in Allamakee County, Iowa, in 1903

The first flour mill in Allamakee County was established at Village Creek in 1853. The villages of Milton, Village Creek, and Howard Center were platted in quick succession in December 1854, March 1857, and September 1857, respectively. All three villages were close to one another and became known as Village Creek. A post office was established in 1857.

Village Creek became a major manufacturing center; after the first flour mill, more were added, and a woolen mill followed.

On June 24, 1882, the Village Creek valley experienced record flooding, and the residents of Village Creek were threatened with swiftly rising waters. The flood washed away both the wagon bridge and the railroad bridge in Village Creek.

Village Creek's population was 137 in 1902, 89 in 1915, and 178 in 1925.

Village Creek's population was 27 in 1940.
