= Makee Township, Allamakee County, Iowa =

Township in Iowa, US

Makee Township, Allamakee County
- Township
- Coordinates: 43°17′31″N 091°25′27″W
- Country: United States
- State: Iowa
- County: Allamakee

Area
  - Total: 35.69 sq mi (92.44 km^{2})
  - Land: 35.69 sq mi (92.44 km^{2})
  - Water: 0 sq mi (0 km^{2})
- Elevation: 1,125 ft (343 m)

Population (2010)
  - Total: 4,176
  - Density: 117/sq mi (45.2/km^{2})
- Time zone: UTC-6 (CST)
  - Summer (DST): UTC-5 (CDT)
- FIPS code: 19-92799
- GNIS feature ID: 0468333

Makee Township is one of eighteen townships in Allamakee County, Iowa, USA. At the 2010 census, its population was 4,176.

== History ==
Makee Township was organized in 1852.

== Geography ==
Makee Township covers an area of 35.69 square miles (92.4 km^{2}) and contains one incorporated settlement, Waukon, which is the Allamakee County seat. According to the USGS, it contains five cemeteries: County Care Facility, Lycurgus, Makee Township, Oakland and Round Prairie.
