= Hanover Township, Allamakee County, Iowa =

Township in Iowa, US

Hanover Township, Allamakee County
- Township
- Coordinates: 43°23′09″N 091°33′02″W
- Country: United States
- State: Iowa
- County: Allamakee

Area
  - Total: 35.96 sq mi (93.14 km^{2})
  - Land: 35.93 sq mi (93.07 km^{2})
  - Water: 0.027 sq mi (0.07 km^{2})
- Elevation: 827 ft (252 m)

Population (2010)
  - Total: 193
  - Density: 5.4/sq mi (2.1/km^{2})
- Time zone: UTC-6 (CST)
  - Summer (DST): UTC-5 (CDT)
- FIPS code: 19-91824
- GNIS feature ID: 0467998

Hanover Township is one of eighteen townships in Allamakee County, Iowa, USA. At the 2010 census, its population was 193.

== History ==
Hanover Township was organized in 1855.

== Geography ==
Hanover Township covers an area of 35.96 square miles (93.1 km^{2}) and contains no incorporated settlements. According to the USGS, it contains three cemeteries: Iowa River, O'Hare Place and Saint Patricks.
