= Union City Township, Allamakee County, Iowa =

Township in Iowa, US

Union City Township, Allamakee County
- Township
- Coordinates: 43°27′38″N 091°25′21″W
- Country: United States
- State: Iowa
- County: Allamakee

Area
  - Total: 30.69 sq mi (79.49 km^{2})
  - Land: 30.67 sq mi (79.43 km^{2})
  - Water: 0.023 sq mi (0.06 km^{2})
- Elevation: 699 ft (213 m)

Population (2010)
  - Total: 219
  - Density: 7.3/sq mi (2.8/km^{2})
- Time zone: UTC-6 (CST)
  - Summer (DST): UTC-5 (CDT)
- FIPS code: 19-94290
- GNIS feature ID: 0468848

Union City Township is one of eighteen townships in Allamakee County, Iowa, USA. At the 2010 census, its population was 219.

== History ==
Union City Township was organized in 1852. The township is named from an early settlement on the north side of the Upper Iowa River above the mouth of French Creek.

== Geography ==
Union City Township covers an area of 30.69 square miles (79.5 km^{2}) and contains no incorporated settlements. According to the USGS, it contains three cemeteries: Mount Hope, Portland Prairie and Wheatland.
