= Old Allamakee County Courthouse (Waukon, Iowa) =

- Allamakee County Courthouse
- U.S. National Register of Historic Places
- The museum in 2020

- Location within Iowa Location within the United States
- Location: 107 Allamakee St. Waukon, Iowa
- Coordinates: 43°16′15″N 91°28′31″W
- Area: less than one acre
- Built: 1861
- Architectural style: Greek Revival
- MPS: County Courthouses in Iowa TR
- NRHP reference No.: 77000492
- Added to NRHP: April 11, 1977

The Old Allamakee County Courthouse, also known as the Allamakee County Historical Museum, is a historic building located in Waukon, Iowa, United States. It was built in 1861 and was listed on the National Register of Historic Places in 1977 as a part of the County Courthouses in Iowa Thematic Resource. It was the second building used for court functions and county administration.

== History ==
There was a long and bitter fight between the towns of Waukon and Lansing as to which one would be the county seat in Allamakee County. The Iowa legislature chose Jefferson Township as the county seat. An election in 1851 rejected the choice as well as others and Columbus became the county seat. Two years later the legislature approved a petition to move the county seat closer to the center of the county and Waukon received two-thirds of the vote. A frame building in Waukon was used as a courthouse beginning in 1854, and a second building was constructed next to it in 1857. They served together as the courthouse until this building was completed. In 1859 Lansing offered to build an $8,000 courthouse and Waukon countered with its own offer and won by 420 votes. This building was constructed for the courthouse in Waukon, and it was completed for $13,635 in 1861. That same year both Columbus and Lansing joined together to fight for the courthouse. This time they beat Waukon by 22 votes in an election that was held in 1862. Court functions and records were moved to Lansing. Another election was held in 1864 with similar results. The county sheriff, who lived in Waukon, along with a posse removed the county records from Lansing. He was intercepted by horsemen from Lansing and forced to return the records. In 1867 the Iowa Supreme Court ruled that Waukon was the county seat. The building constructed in 1861 served as the county courthouse until 1940 when the present courthouse was built. The old courthouse was converted into a history museum from 1964 to 1966.

== Architecture ==
The Old Allamakee County Courthouse is a two-story, brick, vernacular Greek Revival structure. It is a temple form without a portico. On the roof above the main entrance is a two-stage cupola. It features cornice work and paired brackets on both stages, louvers at the bell chamber, and a finial on top of its tin-covered dome. Other decorative elements of the building include a classical pediment with a returned cornice and paired brackets, simple brick pilasters on all four sides of the building, and stone window sills and lintels. Even though the interior was altered in the 1960s, it still retains tin ceilings, most of its original woodwork, and a divided-flight stairway with large wooden newel posts and slender spindles.
