= Village Creek (Allamakee County, Iowa) =

- Mouth of Village Creek to the Mississippi

Location
- Country: United States
- State: Iowa
- District: Allamakee County

Physical characteristics
- Source
  - coordinates: 43.286°N 91.497°W
- Mouth: Mississippi River
  - coordinates: 43.347°N 91.204°W

Village Creek is a minor tributary of the Upper Mississippi River, rising and exiting in Allamakee County, Iowa. The headwaters are just north of Waukon, and about 2.5 miles east of there, it enters a canyon bounded by limestone cliffs. Numerous small springs feed the creek as it flows through Lafayette and Center Townships. By the time the creek reaches the Mississippi, the bluffs rise 400 feet above the water.

Paint Creek enters the Navigation Pool 9 of the Mississippi a few miles downstream of the Black Hawk Bridge. The catchment contains some farmland, but the area is mostly forested. In recent years, it has seen residential development on large country lots and locally, "Village Creek" is used for the district.

== See also ==
- List of rivers of Iowa
