= Franklin Township, Allamakee County, Iowa =

Township in Iowa, US

Franklin Township, Allamakee County
- Township
- Coordinates: 43°07′34″N 091°25′41″W
- Country: United States
- State: Iowa
- County: Allamakee

Area
  - Total: 35.63 sq mi (92.28 km^{2})
  - Land: 35.63 sq mi (92.28 km^{2})
  - Water: 0 sq mi (0 km^{2})
- Elevation: 833 ft (254 m)

Population (2010)
  - Total: 408
  - Density: 11/sq mi (4.4/km^{2})
- Time zone: UTC-6 (CST)
  - Summer (DST): UTC-5 (CDT)
- FIPS code: 19-91383
- GNIS feature ID: 0467848

Franklin Township is one of eighteen townships in Allamakee County, Iowa, USA. At the 2010 census, its population was 408.

== Geography ==
Franklin Township covers an area of 35.63 square miles (92.3 km^{2}) and contains no incorporated settlements. According to the USGS, it contains five cemeteries: Bailey Plot, Cummings Plot, Hardin, Smithfield and Volney.
