= Paint Creek Township, Allamakee County, Iowa =

Township in Iowa, US

Paint Creek Township, Allamakee County
- Township
- Coordinates: 43°12′32″N 091°18′16″W
- Country: United States
- State: Iowa
- County: Allamakee

Area
  - Total: 36.23 sq mi (93.84 km^{2})
  - Land: 36.23 sq mi (93.84 km^{2})
  - Water: 0 sq mi (0 km^{2})
- Elevation: 837 ft (255 m)

Population (2010)
  - Total: 544
  - Density: 15/sq mi (5.8/km^{2})
- Time zone: UTC-6 (CST)
  - Summer (DST): UTC-5 (CDT)
- FIPS code: 19-93255
- GNIS feature ID: 0468493

Paint Creek Township is one of eighteen townships in Allamakee County, Iowa, United States. At the 2010 census, its population was 544.

== History ==
Paint Creek Township was organized in 1852.

== Geography ==
Paint Creek Township covers an area of 36.23 square miles (93.8 km^{2}) and contains one incorporated settlement, Waterville. According to the USGS, it contains three cemeteries: East Paint Creek Synod, Maple Hill and Waterville Lutheran.
