= Ludlow Township, Allamakee County, Iowa =

Township in Iowa, US

Ludlow Township, Allamakee County
- Township
- Coordinates: 43°12′16″N 091°33′09″W
- Country: United States
- State: Iowa
- County: Allamakee

Area
  - Total: 35.12 sq mi (90.97 km^{2})
  - Land: 35.12 sq mi (90.97 km^{2})
  - Water: 0 sq mi (0 km^{2})
- Elevation: 1,168 ft (356 m)

Population (2010)
  - Total: 585
  - Density: 17/sq mi (6.4/km^{2})
- Time zone: UTC-6 (CST)
  - Summer (DST): UTC-5 (CDT)
- FIPS code: 19-92727
- GNIS feature ID: 0468309

Ludlow Township is one of eighteen townships in Allamakee County, Iowa, United States. At the 2010 census, its population was 585.

== History ==
Ludlow Township was organized in 1852.

== Geography ==
Ludlow Township covers an area of 35.12 square miles (91.0 km^{2}) and contains no incorporated settlements. According to the USGS, it contains three cemeteries: Bethlehem, Salem United and Zalmona.
