= Center Township, Allamakee County, Iowa =

Township in Iowa, US

Center Township, Allamakee County
- Township
- Coordinates: 43°18′17″N 091°18′35″W
- Country: United States
- State: Iowa
- County: Allamakee

Area
  - Total: 36.39 sq mi (94.26 km^{2})
  - Land: 36.39 sq mi (94.26 km^{2})
  - Water: 0 sq mi (0 km^{2})
- Elevation: 741 ft (226 m)

Population (2010)
  - Total: 329
  - Density: 9.1/sq mi (3.5/km^{2})
- Time zone: UTC-6 (CST)
  - Summer (DST): UTC-5 (CDT)
- FIPS code: 19-90582
- GNIS feature ID: 0467569

Center Township is one of eighteen townships in Allamakee County, Iowa, United States. At the 2010 census, its population was 329.

== History ==
Center Township was organized in 1856.

== Geography ==
Center Township covers an area of 36.39 square miles (94.2 km^{2}) and contains no incorporated settlements. According to the USGS, it contains nine cemeteries: Center Baptist, Elon, Faegre Prairie, Lutheran, Old East Paint Creek, Old West Paint Creek, Reynolds Plot, Roese Plot and West Paint Creek Synod.
