= Quandahl, Iowa =

- Unincorporated community
- Location within Iowa
- Coordinates: 43°27′00″N 91°36′24″W
- Country: United States
- State: Iowa
- County: Allamakee
- Elevation: 823 ft (251 m)
- Time zone: UTC-6 (Central (CST))
  - Summer (DST): UTC-5 (CDT)
- Area code: 563
- GNIS feature ID: 460480

Quandahl is an unincorporated community in Allamakee County, Iowa, United States.

== History ==
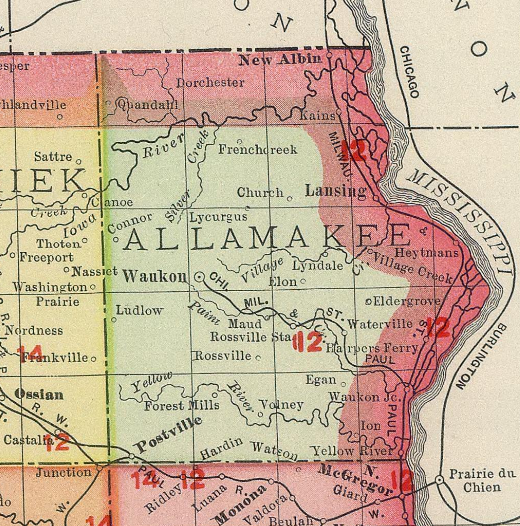
Quandahl in Allamakee County, Iowa, in 1903

Quandahl was founded in the northwestern corner of the county; the community's post office opened in 1877 and closed in 1906.

Quandahl's population was 28 in 1902, and was 42 in 1925. The population was 60 in 1940.

In the 1920s, Quandahl had a bank, a mill, a creamery, and a blacksmith shop. The failure of the bank in the early 1930s set Quandahl down a path of decline, according to a new article from the era.

In 1946, the almost-deserted community was reborn when a lens factory opened in Quandahl. The factory was owned by Theodore Franklin, and was credited for reviving the failing community.

The community is adjacent to the Bear Creek Public Access area.
