= Postville Herald =

Weekly newspaper published in Postville, Iowa

The Postville Herald
- "A Live Newspaper for a Live Community since 1892"
- Type: Weekly newspaper
- Format: 27" Broadsheet
- Owner: Mid America Publishing
- Editor: Melissa R. Collum
- Founded: 1892
- Language: English
- Headquarters: 112 North Lawler St, PO Box 100, Postville, Iowa 52162
- Circulation: 508
- Price: $1.00 single issue
- Website: postvilleherald.com

The Postville Herald is the official newspaper of Postville, Iowa. It is also one of two official newspapers of Allamakee. Seated at the hub of the four counties of Allamakee, Clayton, Winneshiek and Fayette, the Herald covers news and events in the four-county region.

== History ==
The Herald was originally established in 1892. However, during the early periods of history, there was no newspaper.

The function was carried on instead by the regular community gossip circles, such as they might pick up and carry home as they stood and talked around the “pot-bellied” stoves, or drank a glass of beer or whiskey in the village saloon. Most of the national and state news was brought into the community by letters from friends of relatives and strangers passing through.

During the early 1870s, F. M. McCormack from Decorah became interested in beginning a weekly newspaper in Postville. After a meeting of the chief citizens, a name was selected and the first issue of the Postville Review came off the press on March 19, 1873. He sold his interests in 1875 to W. N. Burdick who published it until his death in 1901 when it passed on to his sons, A. E. and A. S. Burdick. They continued to publish it until it ceased in 1921.

The Iowa Volksblatt, a German newspaper, served the community for many years. There was a large influx of German people in this area who could not read or write the English language but most of them could read or write German. They discussed the subject of a German newspaper with their pastor, Rev. J. Gass. In 1891 Rev. Gass began the publication of the Iowa Volksblatt. In 1895 he transferred the management of the paper to his printers, Henry Brechler and Guxtav Dietsch of Milwaukee, Wisconsin. By this time the paper was well established. Mr. Dietsch bought his partners share in 1897 and published the paper alone until 1908 when he sold his plant and office building to Paul Ronneburger and Sam Hoesly of Monroe, Wis.

William J. Klingbeil of Monroe purchase Sam Hoesly's half interest in the paper on June 1, 1914. In 1918 he also bought Mr. Ronneburgers’ interest, changed the name to the Postville Herald and began to publish in English rather than German. Consequently, the Herald was a direct descendant of the Volksblatt, with its roots dating back to 1891. In order to ensure success of his new paper he employed the dean of Postville's newsmen, Bert Tuttle of the Review. Bert served as assistant and managing editor for over 55 years. He probably knew more about Postville and the papers on which he worked than any other individual in the community. It is said that he alone got Ringling Brothers Circus to come to Postville in 1916.

Klingbeil served as editor and publisher of the paper until 1948 with the exception of about two years. He sold his interest in the paper to C. W. DeGarmo and Fred L. Martin. After the death of Mr. DeGarmo, James Seeley became partners with Fred Martin until Martins death. In 1985 Seeley sold the paper to Patrick Huber of Clarksville, Iowa. He was the sole publisher of the Herald from 1985 to 1991.

The Wisconsin-based News Publishing Company of Mt. Horeb began a competing publication, the Postville Leader. Later the same year, the Herald was bought out by the Leader and the publication was renamed the Postville Herald-Leader. The Herald-Leader was purchased and renamed the Postville Herald at the end October 2009 by Meyer Information Technology. As of January 1, 2015 the Herald was purchased by Mid-America Publishing of Hampton, Iowa.

In March 2026, Mid-America Publishing announced it will cease operations and shutter the Postville Herald, Monona Outlook and Calmar Courier unless a buyer could be found.
