= Elon, Iowa =

- Unincorporated community
- Location within Iowa
- Coordinates: 43°15′51″N 91°19′26″W
- Country: United States
- State: Iowa
- County: Allamakee
- Elevation: 1,257 ft (383 m)
- Time zone: UTC-6 (Central (CST))
  - Summer (DST): UTC-5 (CDT)
- Area code: 563
- GNIS feature ID: 464536

Elon is an unincorporated community in Allamakee County, Iowa, United States.

== History ==
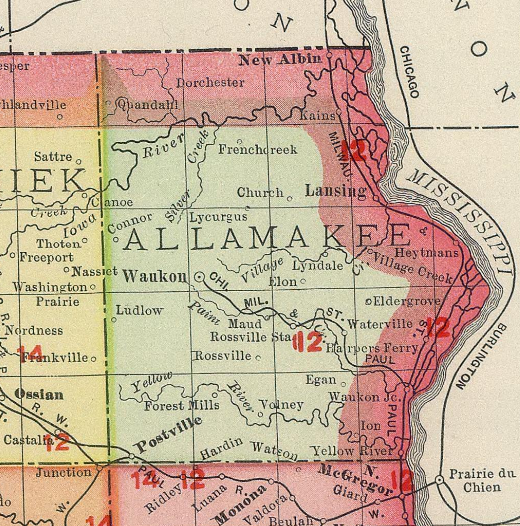
Elon in Allamakee County, Iowa, in 1903

A post office was opened in Elon in 1850; the first postmaster was Mr. Eldridge Howard, a Methodist minister, who preached in at least three area communities. Reverend Howard conducted the first funeral in the township, and his home served as the first place where the first school meeting was held on May 14, 1855.

The post office and store, located in section 32 of Center Township, was operated for many years by Edward Roese; Boese moved to the American West around 1913. Another store in Elon was operated by the Roe brothers, circa 1913. According to some county histories, "Elon never had more than four to six houses" and these two stores.

Elon's population was 17 in 1900. The Elon Post office closed in 1907.

The population of the community was 18 in 1925. The population was 5 in 1940.

== See also ==
- Dorchester, Iowa
