= Union Prairie Township, Allamakee County, Iowa =

Township in Iowa, US

Union Prairie Township, Allamakee County
- Township
- Coordinates: 43°18′12″N 091°33′29″W
- Country: United States
- State: Iowa
- County: Allamakee

Area
  - Total: 35.40 sq mi (91.68 km^{2})
  - Land: 35.40 sq mi (91.68 km^{2})
  - Water: 0 sq mi (0 km^{2})
- Elevation: 1,237 ft (377 m)

Population (2010)
  - Total: 761
  - Density: 21/sq mi (8.3/km^{2})
- Time zone: UTC-6 (CST)
  - Summer (DST): UTC-5 (CDT)
- FIPS code: 19-94293
- GNIS feature ID: 0468849

Union Prairie Township is one of eighteen townships in Allamakee County, Iowa, USA. At the 2010 census, its population was 761.

== History ==
Union Prairie Township was organized in 1852.

== Geography ==
Union Prairie Township covers an area of 35.4 square miles (92 km^{2}) and contains no incorporated settlements. According to the USGS, it contains three cemeteries: Eells Plot, Mount Olivet and West Ridge.
