= French Creek Township, Allamakee County, Iowa =

Township in Iowa, US

French Creek Township, Allamakee County
- Township
- Coordinates: 43°23′01″N 091°25′27″W
- Country: United States
- State: Iowa
- County: Allamakee

Area
  - Total: 36.58 sq mi (94.73 km^{2})
  - Land: 36.58 sq mi (94.73 km^{2})
  - Water: 0 sq mi (0 km^{2})
- Elevation: 1,020 ft (310 m)

Population (2010)
  - Total: 225
  - Density: 6.2/sq mi (2.4/km^{2})
- Time zone: UTC-6 (CST)
  - Summer (DST): UTC-5 (CDT)
- FIPS code: 19-91488
- GNIS feature ID: 0467883

French Creek Township is one of eighteen townships in Allamakee County, Iowa, USA. At the 2010 census, its population was 225.

== History ==
French Creek Township was organized in 1856. It is named for the creek flowing through it. French is the name of an early settler who lived near the head of French Creek.

== Geography ==
French Creek Township covers an area of 36.58 square miles (94.7 km^{2}) and contains no incorporated settlements. According to the USGS, it contains two cemeteries: English Bench and French Creek Methodist.
