= Allamakee County, Iowa =

County in Iowa, United States

- County
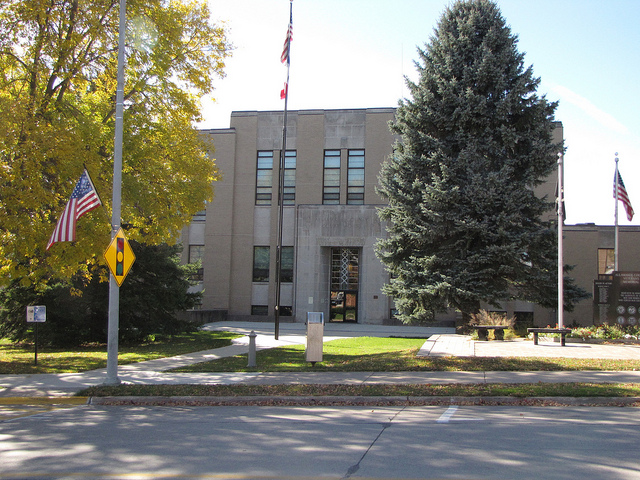
- Allamakee County Court House in Waukon, Iowa

- Logo

- Location within the U.S. state of Iowa
- Coordinates: 43°17′12″N 91°22′27″W
- Country: United States
- State: Iowa
- Founded: 1847
- Seat: Waukon
- Largest city: Waukon

Area
  - Total: 659 sq mi (1,710 km^{2})
  - Land: 639 sq mi (1,660 km^{2})
  - Water: 20 sq mi (52 km^{2}) 3.0%

Population (2020)
  - Total: 14,061
  - Estimate (2025): 14,238 ▲
  - Density: 22.0/sq mi (8.50/km^{2})
- Time zone: UTC−6 (Central)
  - Summer (DST): UTC−5 (CDT)
- Congressional district: 2nd
- Website: allamakeecounty.iowa.gov
- Iowa county number 03

Allamakee County (/ˈæləməˌki/) is the northeasternmost county in the U.S. state of Iowa. As of the 2020 census, the population was 14,061. Its county seat is Waukon.

== History ==
Allamakee County was formed on February 20, 1847. The derivation of the name is debated, some believing it was the name of an Indian chief, others think it was named for Allen Magee, an early historic trader. The first Allamakee County Courthouse in Waukon, built in 1861, now serves as the Allamakee County Historical Museum. The present Allamakee County Court House was built in 1940. Both courthouse buildings are listed on the National Register of Historic Places.

== Geography ==
Soils of Allamakee County

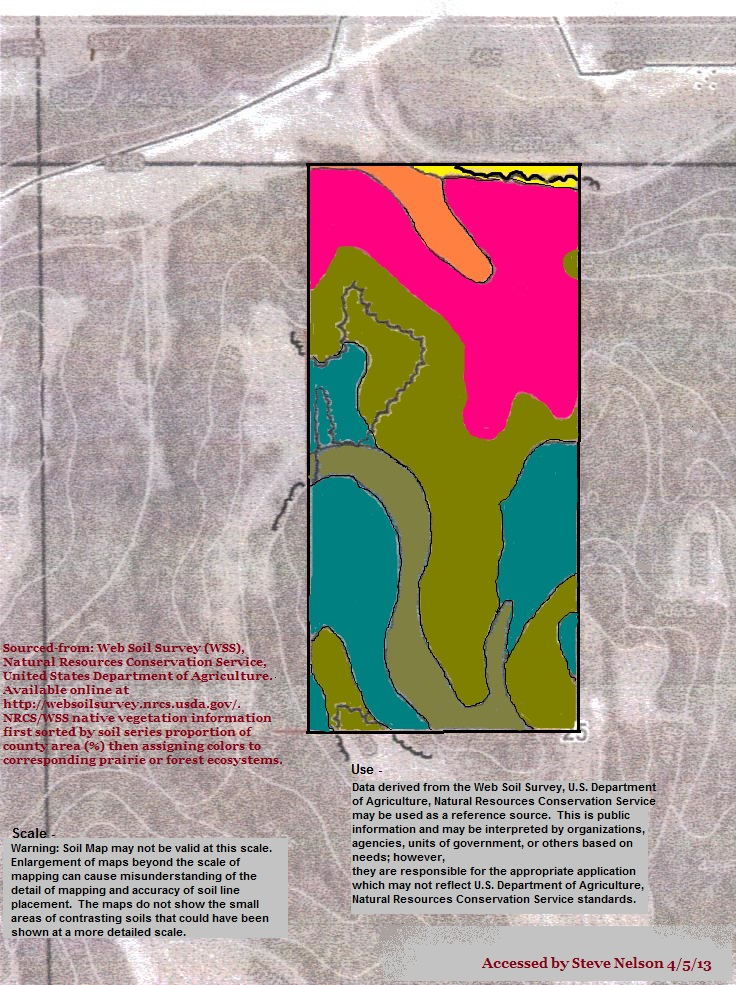
Soils of private land in Allamakee County

According to the U.S. Census Bureau, the county has a total area of 659 square miles (1,710 km^{2}), of which 639 square miles (1,660 km^{2}) is land and 20 square miles (52 km^{2}) (3.0%) is water.

In the northern part of the county is the Upper Iowa River. In the southern part is the Yellow River. The eastern boundary is the Mississippi River. All offer scenic and recreational opportunities, particularly in Yellow River State Forest.

French Creek flows north of Waukon, outside the city limits. Paint Creek, named after Paint Rock Bluff, flows out of the south of Waukon. Norfolk creek originates in the western outskirts of Waukon and is effluent to the Yellow River. Clear Creek flows into Lansing. Village Creek flows through essentially rural terrain. All are tributary to the Mississippi River.

The landforms encountered in the county are very unlike those found in most of Iowa, which is mostly absent Glacial Drift. As part of the Driftless Area, the county was ice free during the last ice age, and as one progresses to the Mississippi River, the streams and rivers display high-walled canyons carved of Cambrian and Ordovician period bedrock. This Driftless Area also includes parts of Clayton, Fayette, Winneshiek, Howard, Dubuque, and Jackson Counties.

=== Major highways ===
- U.S. Highway 18
- U.S. Highway 52
- Iowa Highway 9
- Iowa Highway 26
- Iowa Highway 51
- Iowa Highway 76

=== Adjacent counties ===
- Houston County, Minnesota (north)
- Vernon County, Wisconsin (northeast)
- Crawford County, Wisconsin (east)
- Clayton County (south)
- Winneshiek County (west)
- Fayette County (southwest)

== Demographics ==
Historical population
Census	Pop.	Note	%±
1850	777		—
1860	12,237		1,474.9%
1870	17,868		46.0%
1880	19,791		10.8%
1890	17,907		−9.5%
1900	18,711		4.5%
1910	17,328		−7.4%
1920	17,285		−0.2%
1930	16,328		−5.5%
1940	17,184		5.2%
1950	16,351		−4.8%
1960	15,982		−2.3%
1970	14,968		−6.3%
1980	15,108		0.9%
1990	13,855		−8.3%
2000	14,675		5.9%
2010	14,330		−2.4%
2020	14,061		−1.9%
2025 (est.)	14,238	▲	1.3%
U.S. Decennial Census; 1790-1960 1900-1990; 1990-2000 2010-2018

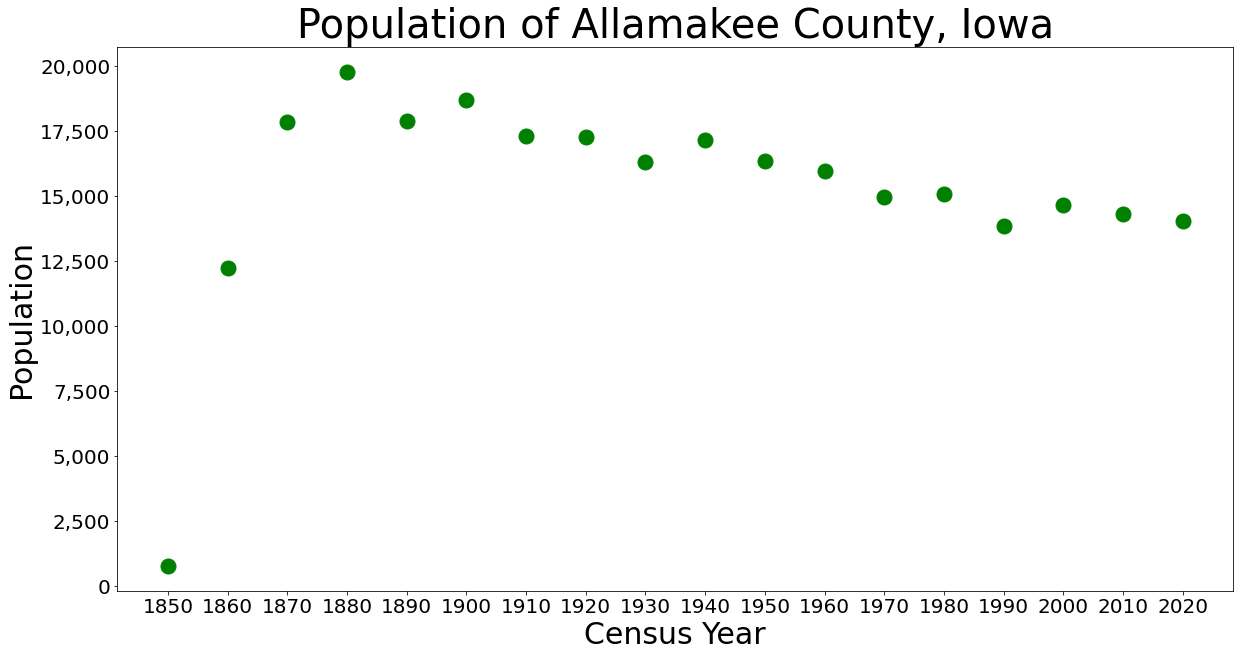
Population of Allamakee County from US census data

=== 2020 census ===
As of the 2020 census, the county had a population of 14,061 and a population density of 21.3/sq mi (8.2/km^{2}).

96.88% of the population reported being of one race, including 89.8% White, 1.1% Black or African American, 0.6% American Indian and Alaska Native, 0.3% Asian, <0.1% Native Hawaiian or Pacific Islander, 5.0% from some other race, and 3.1% from two or more races. Non-Hispanic Whites alone comprised 81.08% of the population, and Hispanic or Latino residents of any race made up 8.7% of the population.

The median age was 43.2 years. 23.3% of residents were under the age of 18 and 23.0% of residents were 65 years of age or older. For every 100 females there were 103.0 males, and for every 100 females age 18 and over there were 101.0 males age 18 and over.

There were 5,797 households in the county, of which 26.3% had children under the age of 18 living in them. Of all households, 52.3% were married-couple households, 19.8% were households with a male householder and no spouse or partner present, and 21.7% were households with a female householder and no spouse or partner present. About 31.2% of all households were made up of individuals and 15.1% had someone living alone who was 65 years of age or older. There were 7,668 housing units, of which 24.4% were vacant. Among occupied housing units, 77.3% were owner-occupied and 22.7% were renter-occupied. The homeowner vacancy rate was 1.6% and the rental vacancy rate was 8.7%.

<0.1% of residents lived in urban areas, while 100.0% lived in rural areas.

=== 2010 census ===
The 2010 census recorded a population of 14,330 in the county, with a population density of 22.4/sq mi (8.6/km^{2}). There were 7,617 housing units, of which 5,845 were occupied.

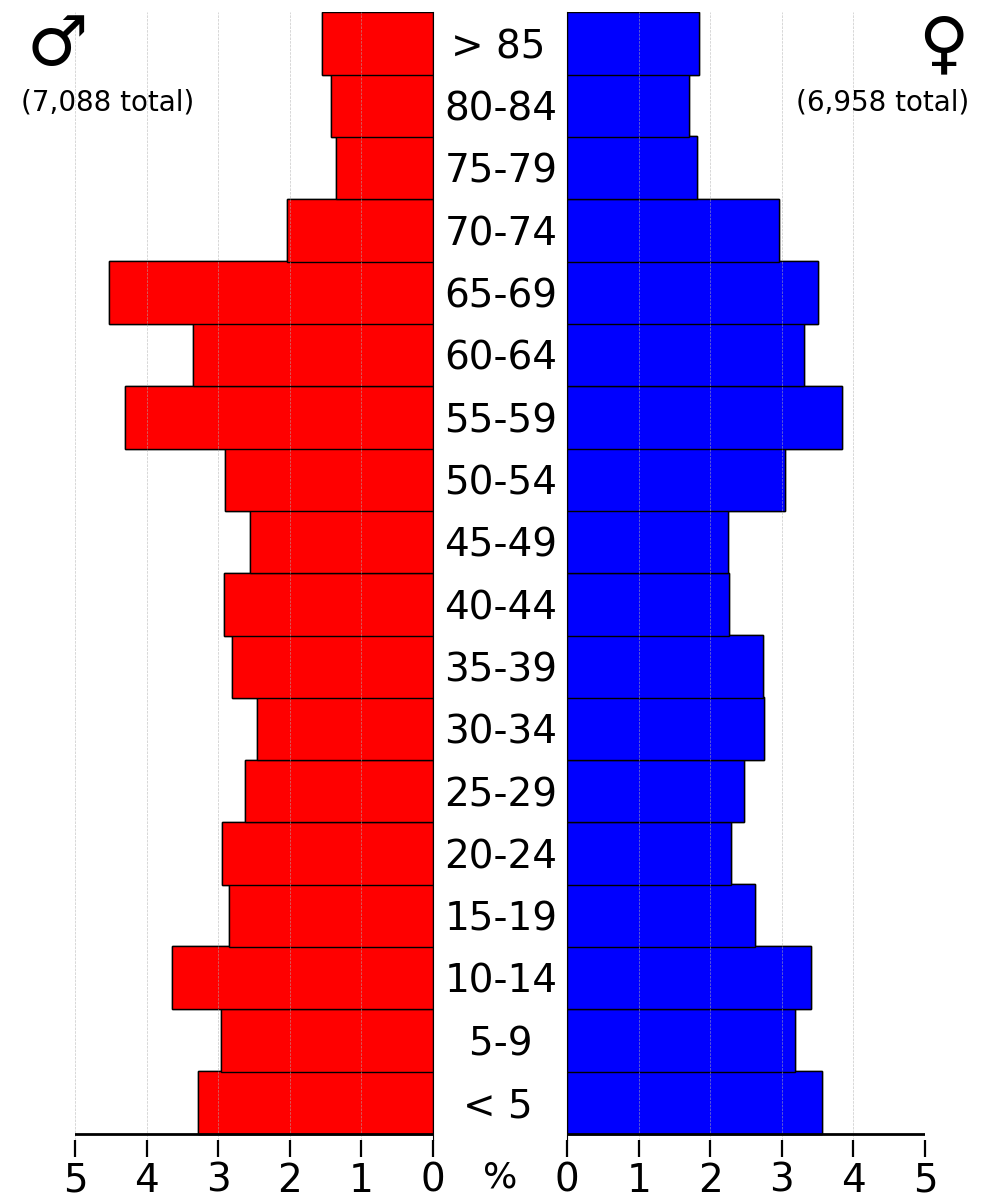
2022 US Census population pyramid for Allamakee County from ACS 5-year estimates

=== 2000 census ===
As of the census of 2000, there were 14,675 people, 5,722 households, and 3,931 families residing in the county. The population density was 23 people per square mile (8.9 people/km^{2}). There were 7,142 housing units at an average density of 11 units per square mile (4.2 units/km^{2}). The racial makeup of the county was 95.88% White, 0.14% Black or African American, 0.18% Native American, 0.27% Asian, 0.01% Pacific Islander, 2.82% from other races, and 0.70% from two or more races. 3.54% of the population were Hispanic or Latino of any race.

There were 5,722 households, out of which 30.60% had children under the age of 18 living with them, 58.40% were married couples living together, 6.60% had a female householder with no husband present, and 31.30% were non-families. 27.50% of all households were made up of individuals, and 14.30% had someone living alone who was 65 years of age or older. The average household size was 2.49 and the average family size was 3.02.

In the county, the population was spread out, with 25.40% under the age of 18, 7.00% from 18 to 24, 25.60% from 25 to 44, 23.60% from 45 to 64, and 18.40% who were 65 years of age or older. The median age was 40 years. For every 100 females there were 100.20 males. For every 100 females age 18 and over, there were 98.90 males.

The median income for a household in the county was $33,967, and the median income for a family was $40,589. Males had a median income of $26,122 versus $19,098 for females. The per capita income for the county was $16,599. About 6.40% of families and 9.60% of the population were below the poverty line, including 11.80% of those under age 18 and 8.10% of those age 65 or over.

== Notable sites ==
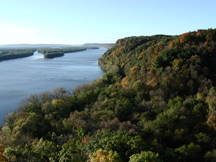
View of the Mississippi from Effigy Mounds National Monument

- Effigy Mounds National Monument is found in the southeast corner of the county.
- Upper Mississippi River National Wildlife and Fish Refuge encompasses the River.
- Driftless Area National Wildlife Refuge, a collection of small, non-contiguous parcels harboring two endangered species.
- Yellow River State Forest is a four-season state park.

== Media ==
- The Waukon Standard
- The Postville Herald-Leader

== Communities ==
=== Cities ===
- Harpers Ferry
- Lansing
- New Albin
- Postville (part)
- Waterville
- Waukon

=== Townships ===
Allamakee County is divided into eighteen townships:

- Center
- Fairview
- Franklin
- French Creek
- Hanover
- Iowa
- Jefferson
- Lafayette
- Lansing
- Linton
- Ludlow
- Makee
- Paint Creek
- Post
- Taylor
- Union City
- Union Prairie
- Waterloo

=== Unincorporated communities ===
- Church
- Columbus
- Dalby
- Dorchester
- Elon
- Ion
- Ludlow
- Lycurgus
- Maud
- Myron
- Quandahl
- Rossville
- Thompson Corner
- Village Creek
- Volney
- Waukon Junction

=== Ghost towns ===
- Columbus
- Hardin
- Ion
- Myron
- Village Creek

=== Population ranking ===
The population ranking of the following table is based on the 2020 census of Allamakee County.

† county seat

Rank	City/Town/etc.	Municipal type	Population (2020 Census)	Population (2024 Estimate)
1	† Waukon	City	3,827	3,865
2	Postville (partially in Clayton County)	City	2,503	2,618
3	Lansing	City	968	976
4	New Albin	City	432	418
5	Harpers Ferry	City	262	270
6	Waterville	City	109	110

== Politics ==
Allamakee County has been a Republican stronghold for most of its history. Between 1932 and 2008, no Democrat obtained an absolute majority in the county, though Franklin D. Roosevelt and Bill Clinton won it by plurality in 1936 and 1992, respectively. In 2008 Barack Obama won the county with a full majority and again in 2012, and since then the Republican strength in the county has increased significantly. The county saw the strongest Republican support in 2024 since the 1952 landslide election.

United States presidential election results for Allamakee County, Iowa
Year	Republican		Democratic		Third party(ies)	
Year	No.	%	No.	%	No.	%
1896	2,471	55.16%	1,897	42.34%	112	2.50%
1900	2,659	58.44%	1,850	40.66%	41	0.90%
1904	2,609	61.77%	1,571	37.19%	44	1.04%
1908	2,521	58.67%	1,725	40.14%	51	1.19%
1912	1,269	29.10%	1,767	40.52%	1,325	30.38%
1916	2,411	57.97%	1,714	41.21%	34	0.82%
1920	5,192	73.23%	1,833	25.85%	65	0.92%
1924	2,755	38.40%	1,289	17.97%	3,131	43.64%
1928	4,785	59.43%	3,227	40.08%	39	0.48%
1932	3,009	38.34%	4,783	60.95%	56	0.71%
1936	4,053	46.25%	4,327	49.38%	383	4.37%
1940	5,840	64.02%	3,258	35.72%	24	0.26%
1944	5,017	63.27%	2,893	36.49%	19	0.24%
1948	4,474	57.91%	3,172	41.06%	80	1.04%
1952	6,087	72.14%	2,341	27.74%	10	0.12%
1956	5,182	66.23%	2,622	33.51%	20	0.26%
1960	4,970	62.78%	2,933	37.05%	13	0.16%
1964	3,691	51.26%	3,504	48.67%	5	0.07%
1968	4,449	62.57%	2,245	31.58%	416	5.85%
1972	4,150	63.24%	2,271	34.61%	141	2.15%
1976	3,648	57.88%	2,568	40.74%	87	1.38%
1980	4,000	60.73%	2,170	32.95%	416	6.32%
1984	3,997	62.91%	2,282	35.91%	75	1.18%
1988	3,186	53.14%	2,768	46.17%	41	0.68%
1992	2,627	39.33%	2,362	35.36%	1,690	25.30%
1996	2,457	42.50%	2,551	44.13%	773	13.37%
2000	3,277	50.71%	2,883	44.61%	302	4.67%
2004	3,530	49.99%	3,449	48.84%	83	1.18%
2008	2,965	41.99%	3,971	56.23%	126	1.78%
2012	3,264	47.07%	3,553	51.24%	117	1.69%
2016	4,093	59.12%	2,421	34.97%	409	5.91%
2020	4,735	63.80%	2,576	34.71%	111	1.50%
2024	4,857	66.37%	2,350	32.11%	111	1.52%

== See also ==
- Cota Creek
- Duck Lake (Iowa)
- National Register of Historic Places listings in Allamakee County, Iowa
- Allamakee County Court House
- The former Allamakee County Courthouse, now a museum
