= Jefferson Township, Allamakee County, Iowa =

Township in Iowa, US

Jefferson Township, Allamakee County
- Township
- Coordinates: 43°12′18″N 091°25′33″W
- Country: United States
- State: Iowa
- County: Allamakee

Area
  - Total: 35.75 sq mi (92.59 km^{2})
  - Land: 35.75 sq mi (92.59 km^{2})
  - Water: 0 sq mi (0 km^{2})
- Elevation: 1,178 ft (359 m)

Population (2010)
  - Total: 607
  - Density: 17/sq mi (6.6/km^{2})
- Time zone: UTC-6 (CST)
  - Summer (DST): UTC-5 (CDT)
- FIPS code: 19-92202
- GNIS feature ID: 0468128

Jefferson Township is one of eighteen townships in Allamakee County, Iowa, USA. At the 2010 census, its population was 607.

== History ==
Jefferson Township was organized in 1852.

== Geography ==
Jefferson Township covers an area of 35.75 square miles (92.6 km^{2}) and contains no incorporated settlements. According to the USGS, it contains six cemeteries: Dundee Plot, Ebenezer, Evergreen, Independent Order of Odd Fellows, Nelson Plot and Rossville.
