= Waukon Junction, Iowa =

- Unincorporated community
- Nickname: The Junction
- Location within Iowa
- Country: United States
- State: Iowa
- County: Allamakee
- Elevation: 636 ft (194 m)
- Time zone: UTC-6 (Central (CST))
  - Summer (DST): UTC-5 (CDT)
- Area code: 563
- GNIS feature ID: 464795

Waukon Junction is an unincorporated community in Allamakee County, Iowa, United States.

== History ==
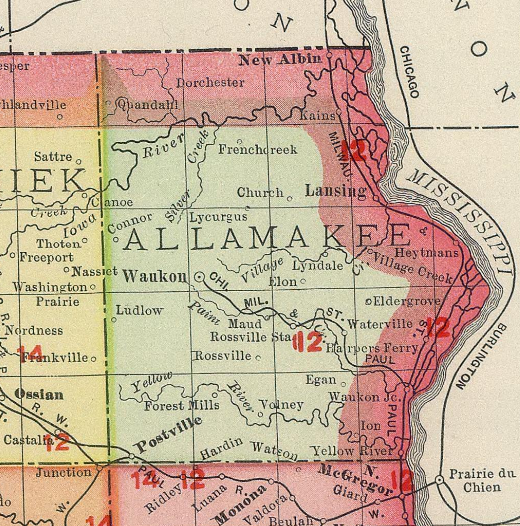
Waukon Junction in Allamakee County, Iowa, in 1903

Waukon Junction got its start following construction of the railroad through that territory. The community's population was 58 in 1902, and 75 in 1925. The population was 33 in 1940.
