= National Register of Historic Places listings in Allamakee County, Iowa =

Location of Allamakee County in Iowa

This is a list of the National Register of Historic Places listings in Allamakee County, Iowa.

This is intended to be a complete list of the properties and districts on the National Register of Historic Places in Allamakee County, Iowa, United States. Latitude and longitude coordinates are provided for many National Register properties and districts; these locations may be seen together in a map.

There are 22 properties and districts listed on the National Register in the county.

This National Park Service list is complete through NPS recent listings posted March 21, 2025.

	Name on the Register	Image	Date listed	Location	City or town	Description
1	Allamakee County Court House	Allamakee County Court House	August 28, 2003 (#03000827)	110 Allamakee Street; 43°16′14″N 91°28′35″W	Waukon	
2	Allamakee County Courthouse	Allamakee County Courthouse	April 11, 1977 (#77000492)	107 Allamakee Street; 43°16′15″N 91°28′31″W	Waukon	
3	Effigy Mounds National Monument	Effigy Mounds National Monument	October 15, 1966 (#66000109)	3 miles north of Marquette on Iowa Highway 76; 43°05′33″N 91°11′46″W	Marquette	Extends into Clayton County
4	Fish Farm Mound Group	Fish Farm Mound Group	July 25, 1988 (#88001131)	Fish Farm Mounds State Preserve; 43°27′19″N 91°16′46″W	New Albin	
5	Otto J. Hager House	Otto J. Hager House	June 27, 1985 (#85001383)	402 Allamakee Street; 43°16′23″N 91°28′33″W	Waukon	
6	Iron Post	Iron Post	September 29, 1976 (#76000732)	Northern end of Main Street; 43°30′03″N 91°16′59″W	New Albin	Survey marker which legally defines the boundary between Minnesota and Iowa.
7	G. Kerndt and Brothers Elevator and Warehouses, No. 11, No.12 and No. 13	G. Kerndt and Brothers Elevator and Warehouses, No. 11, No.12 and No. 13	October 18, 1979 (#79000881)	Front Street; 43°21′43″N 91°12′52″W	Lansing	
8	G. Kerndt & Brothers Office Block	G. Kerndt & Brothers Office Block	November 10, 1982 (#82000402)	4th and Main Street; 43°21′42″N 91°13′07″W	Lansing	
9	Lansing Fisheries Building	Lansing Fisheries Building	December 23, 1991 (#91001832)	Between County Highway X-52 and the Mississippi River in southern Lansing; 43°21′38″N 91°12′49″W	Lansing	
10	Lansing Main Street Historic District	Lansing Main Street Historic District	September 17, 2014 (#14000624)	100–401 Main Street, 1 block north and south on Front and 2nd streets, and 190 John Street; 43°21′43″N 91°12′59″W	Lansing	
11	Lansing Stone School	Lansing Stone School	December 18, 1973 (#73000721)	Southwestern corner of Center and Fifth Streets; 43°21′38″N 91°13′16″W	Lansing	
12	Fred W. Meier Round Barn		June 30, 1986 (#86001411)	Off Iowa Highway 9; 43°14′03″N 91°28′34″W	Ludlow	
13	Old Allamakee County Courthouse	Old Allamakee County Courthouse	February 24, 1983 (#83000338)	Second Street; 43°21′20″N 91°12′44″W	Lansing	
14	Old East Paint Creek Lutheran Church	Old East Paint Creek Lutheran Church	July 7, 1983 (#83000339)	North of Waterville on County Road A-52; 43°15′52″N 91°16′11″W	Waterville	
15	Thomas Reburn Polygonal Barn	Thomas Reburn Polygonal Barn	June 30, 1986 (#86001413)	Off Iowa Highway 26; 43°29′32″N 91°18′11″W	New Albin	
16	Red Bridge	Red Bridge	June 25, 1998 (#98000773)	Fuel Hollow Road over the Yellow River; 43°07′51″N 91°25′29″W	Postville	
17	Slinde Mound Group	Slinde Mound Group	November 1, 1989 (#88001132)	Address Restricted	Hanover Township	
18	Turner Hall	Turner Hall	December 11, 2000 (#00000921)	119 East Greene Street; 43°05′13″N 91°34′04″W	Postville	
19	Upper Iowa River Bridge	Upper Iowa River Bridge	June 25, 1998 (#98000772)	Mays Prairie Road over the Upper Iowa River; 43°25′57″N 91°24′43″W	Dorchester	
20	Waterloo Ridge Menigheds Kirke og Kirkegard Historic District	Waterloo Ridge Menigheds Kirke og Kirkegard Historic District	July 21, 2015 (#15000435)	169 Dorchester Drive; 43°29′08″N 91°36′01″W	Dorchester vicinity	
21	West Paint Creek Synod Evangelical Lutheran Church and Cemetery	West Paint Creek Synod Evangelical Lutheran Church and Cemetery	March 7, 2019 (#100003422)	1351 Elon Dr. 43°15′39″N 91°21′33″W	Waterville	
22	Yellow River State Forest Fire Tower		September 14, 2021 (#100006909)	Fire Tower Rd., Yellow River State Forest; 43°09′44″N 91°14′29″W	Harpers Ferry vicinity	

== Former listings ==
	Name on the Register	Image	Date listed	Date removed	Location	City or town	Description
1	Monsrud Bridge		June 25, 1998 (#98000771)	April 12, 2022	Swebakken Road over Paint Creek; 43°13′08″N 91°19′36″W	Waterville	
2	Postville Public School		April 12, 1984 (#84001200)	September 23, 1987	Ogden and Post Streets	Postville	

== See also ==
- List of National Historic Landmarks in Iowa
- National Register of Historic Places listings in Iowa
- Listings in neighboring counties: Clayton, Crawford (WI), Fayette, Houston (MN), Vernon (WI), Winneshiek
