= Hager House =

Hager House may refer to:

in the United States

(by state then city)

- Hager House (South Bend, Indiana), listed on the NRHP in St. Joseph County
- Otto J. Hager House, Waukon, Iowa, listed on the NRHP in Allamakee County
- Hager House (Hagerstown, Maryland), NRHP-listed
- Hager-Mead House, Waltham, Massachusetts, NRHP-listed
