= King Iron Bridge & Manufacturing Company =

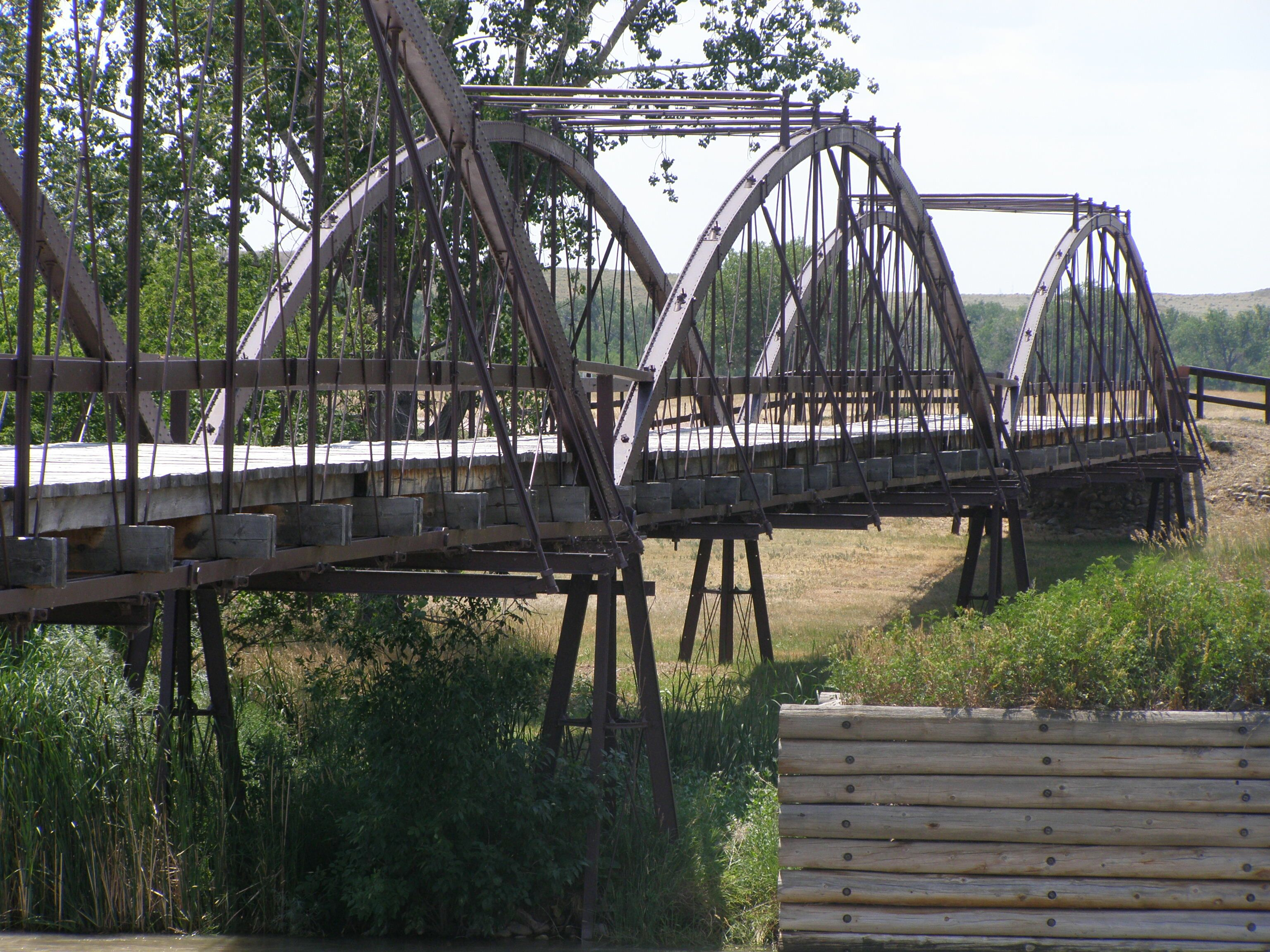
1867 North Platte River, Ft. Laramie, Wyoming

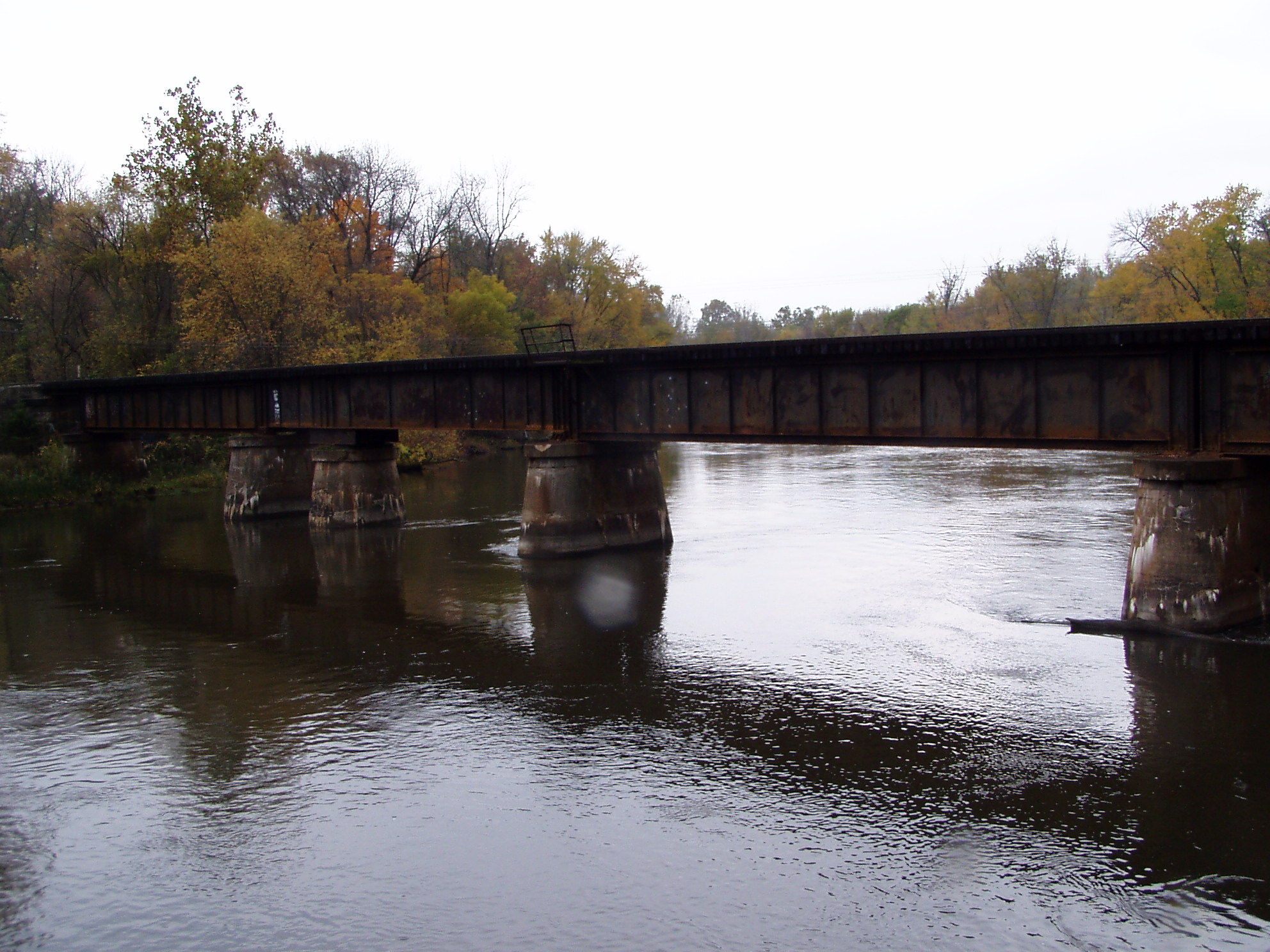
1907 Kalamazoo River bridge near Fennville and Saugatuck, Michigan

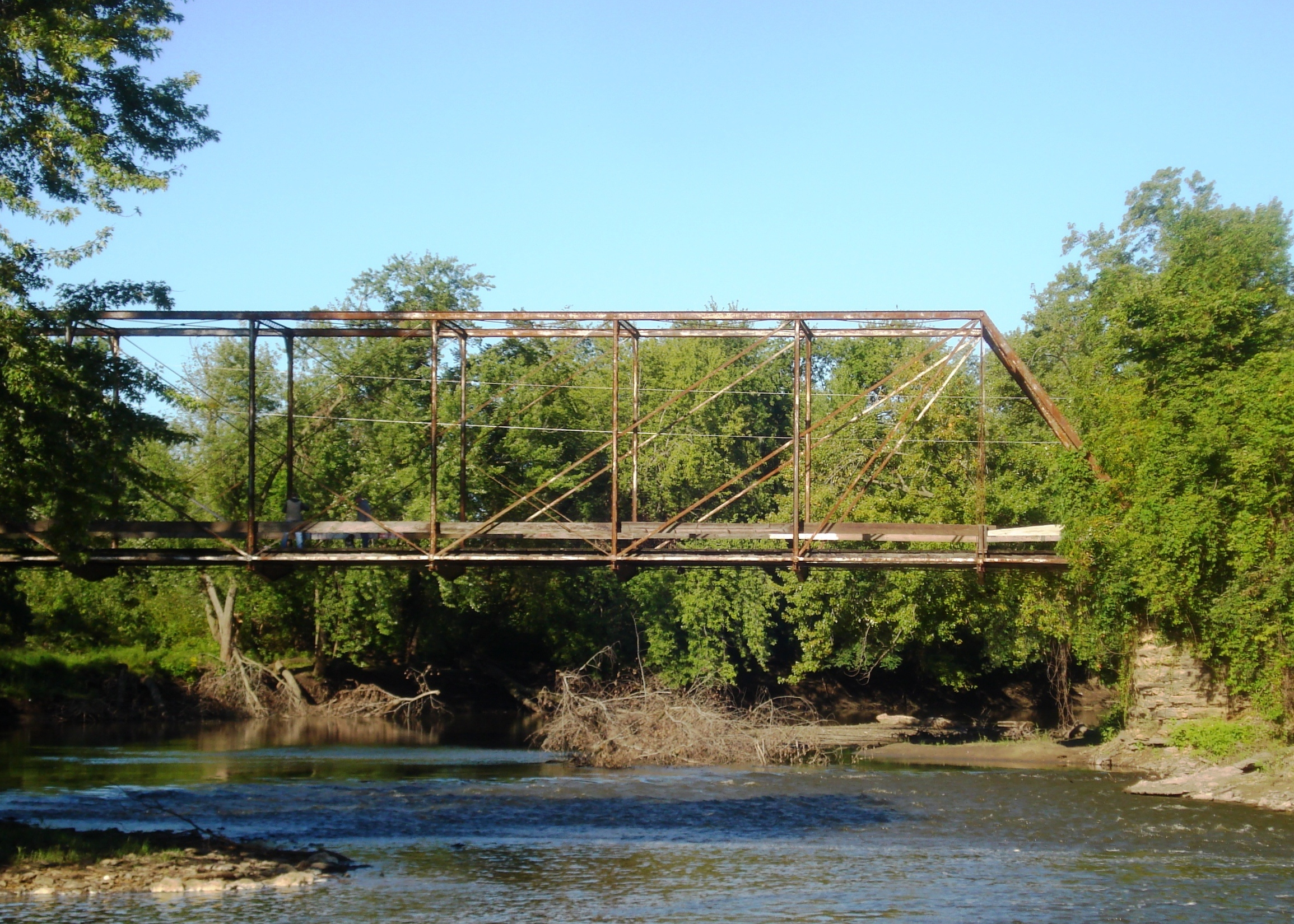
Quarry Bridge over the Iowa River.

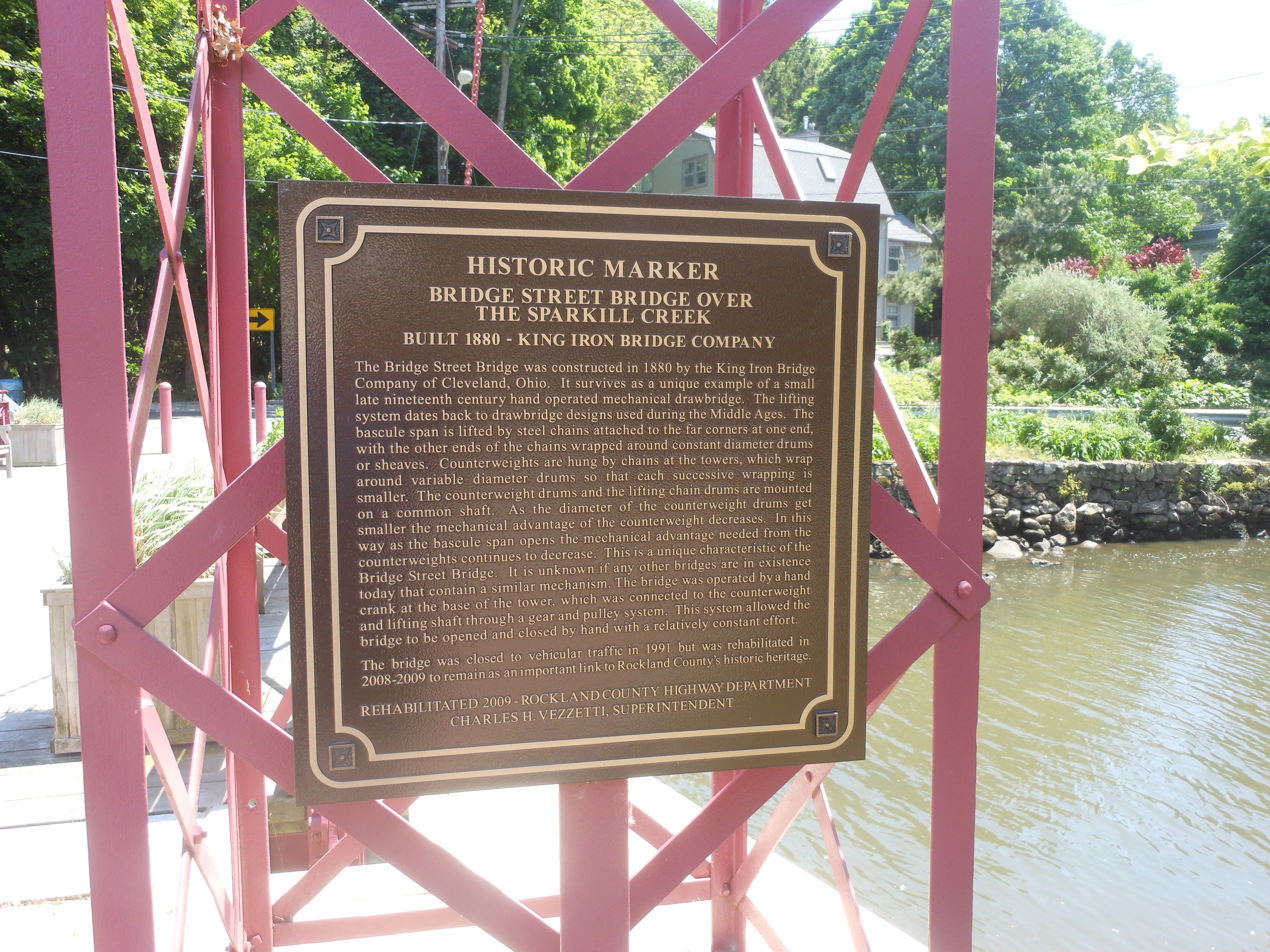
King Iron Bridge Company historic marker in Piermont, New York

The King Iron Bridge & Manufacturing Company was an American bridge building company. It was based in Cleveland, Ohio, United States, and was founded by Zenas King in 1858. It was later managed by his sons, James A. King and Harry W. King, and then his grandson, Norman C. King, until the mid-1920s. Many of the bridges built by the company were used during America's expansion west in the late 19th century and early 20th century, and some of these bridges are still standing today.

== Remaining examples ==
- Pyeatt's Mill Bridge AKA "Boner Bridge" (1869, Restored 2010), Little Pigeon River in Warrick County, Indiana. Listed to NRHP in 2022.
- Crum Road Bridge (1875), Walkersville, Maryland
- Skunk River Bridge (1876), Story County, Iowa. Originally located over the Skunk River in Cambridge, Iowa, moved southeast of Ames, Iowa in 1916. Vacated in 1990, and NRHP-listed in 1998.
- Marmaton Bridge (1878), Fort Scott, Kansas, 1 mile NE of Fort Scott, NRHP-listed
- Bowstring Truss Bridge (1878), near Ironto, Virginia
- Half Chance Iron Bridge (1880), Marengo County, Alabama
- Sparkill Creek Drawbridge (1880), Piermont, New York
- Adel Bridge (1882), Adel, Iowa. NRHP-listed in 2002
- Bentonsport Bridge (1882), Bentonsport, Iowa, NRHP-listed
- Cartwright Creek Bridge (1884), also near Springfield, Kentucky, NRHP-listed
- Old Alton Bridge (1884), Denton County, Texas
- Quarry Bridge (1885), County Road I-4 over the Iowa River, Quarry, Iowa. NRHP-listed
- Second Street Bridge (1886), Allegan, Michigan, NRHP-listed
- Monsrud Bridge (1887), Waterville, Iowa relocated to Yellow River State Forest in 2004, NRHP-listed
- Merriam Street Bridge (1887), Minneapolis, Minnesota (originally built in 1887 as the Broadway Avenue Bridge, one span relocated to Nicollet Island in 1987)
- Swing Bridge at New Bridge Landing (1888), Main St. and Old New Bridge Rd. over Hackensack River, in Teaneck and River Edge, New Jersey NRHP-listed
- Old Richardsville Road Bridge (1889) Bowling Green, Kentucky over Barren River. Bridge is NRHP-listed.
- Bennies Hill Road Bridge (1889), Frederick County, Maryland
- South Dakota Department of Transportation Bridge No. 14-088-170 (1890), Vermillion, South Dakota, local road over Clay Creek Ditch, NRHP-listed
- Clear Creek Bridge (1891), Twp. Rd. over Clear Cr., 5.8 mi. NW of Bellwood, Bellwood, Nebraska NRHP-listed
- Waverly Street Bridge (1892), Waverly St. at Georges Creek, Westernport, Maryland. NRHP-listed
- Hogback Bridge (1893), Curwensville, Pennsylvania
- Singing Bridge (1894), Frankfort, Kentucky, also known as St. Clair Street Bridge
- Ellsworth Ranch Bridge (1895), 130th St., over E fork of Des Moines R., Armstrong, Iowa NRHP-listed
- Rosendale trestle (1895–96), Rosendale, New York
- Dearborn River High Bridge (1897), 15 mi. SW of Augusta on Bean Lake Rd., Augusta, Montana NRHP-listed
- Manhasset Viaduct (1898), carries the Port Washington Branch of the Long Island Rail Road over Manhasset Bay between the Village of Thomaston and the Hamlet of Manhasset.
- Niantic River Bridge (1907), New London County, Connecticut (1907, being replaced in 2010–2012), deemed NRHP-eligible in 1987 but not finally NRHP-listed due to owner objection
- Robidoux Creek Pratt Truss Bridge (1910), Frankfort, Kansas, on Sunflower Road over Robidoux Creek, NRHP-listed
- Detroit-Superior Bridge (1918), Cleveland, Ohio

Additional bridges designed and/or built by the company (and many likely to be surviving) are:

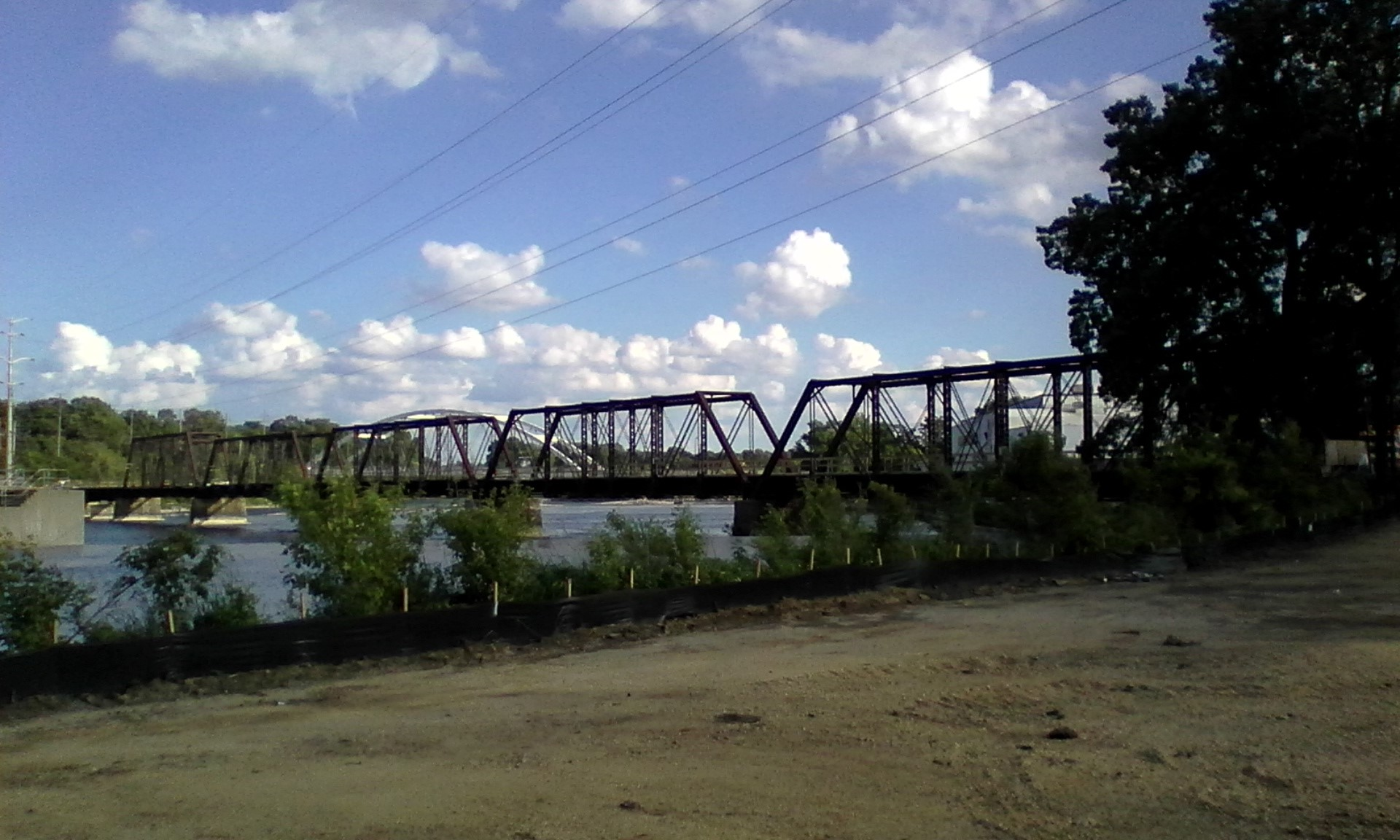
Abandoned Rock River railroad bridge in Rockford, IL. Now used for a rail-trail.

- Abandoned Illinois Railway (IR) Through truss bridge over Rock River, Rockford, Illinois. Built 1890s, relocated to present location 1929. Repurposed as a rail trail bridge in 2016.

Hendricks Ford Bridge (1880) Edinburg, Indiana

== Demolished bridges ==
- KY 2541 Bridge (1884), Greenup, Kentucky over Little Sandy River, NRHP-listed, demolished 2012 and replaced
- Beech Fork Bridge, Mackville Road (1884), near Springfield, Kentucky, NRHP-listed, has been replaced.
- Bridge over North Fork of Roanoke River (1892), near Ironto, Virginia, demolished 1995–1996
- Williams Street Bridge (1894), Helena, Montana, Williams St. crossing Ten Mile Creek, N of jct. of Williams St. and Broadwater Ave., NRHP-listed. Replaced by new bridge in 2010.
- South Dakota Dept. of Transportation Bridge No. 29-221-060 (1894), Castlewood, South Dakota, local road over the Big Sioux River, NRHP-listed, demolished and replaced 1999
