= Skunk River Bridge =

- U.S. National Register of Historic Places
- Skunk River Bridge

- Location within Iowa Location within the United States
- Location: Southeast of Ames, Iowa, over the Skunk River
- Nearest city: Ames, Iowa
- Coordinates: 41°59′12″N 93°35′13″W
- Built: 1876
- Architect: King Bridge Co. of Cleveland, Ohio
- Architectural style: Pinned Warren through truss span
- NRHP reference No.: 98000484
- Added to NRHP: May 15, 1998

The Skunk River Bridge is a Warren truss bridge that crosses Skunk River near Ames, Iowa in Story County, Iowa. It was built in 1876, and was added to the National Register of Historic Places in 1998.

== Description ==
In 1876, Story County Supervisors contracted with King Iron Bridge Company to build three iron truss bridges, the longest of which would cross the Skunk River, just east of Cambridge, Iowa. The Cambridge bridge had an 80 feet (24 m) truss, and its 3 spans had a combined length of 163 feet (50 m). This bridge was used frequently, and underwent occasional repairs. By 1916, it was no longer sufficient to handle the traffic on its road. It was subsequently replaced and moved to its present location, southeast of Ames, Iowa. The bridge was used lightly until 1990, when the road it was on was abandoned. It is still standing, but has fallen into a state of disrepair.

This bridge was added to the National Register of Historic Places in 1998. It was one of only a few Warren truss iron bridges built in Iowa in the late 19th century, and was an important transportation resource during a time of great growth in Story County.

== See also ==
- Quarry Bridge, also by the King Iron Bridge Company and NRHP-listed
