= Anamosa State Penitentiary =

Coordinates: 42.111°N 91.291°W

- Iowa Men's Reformatory Historic District
- U.S. National Register of Historic Places
- U.S. Historic district
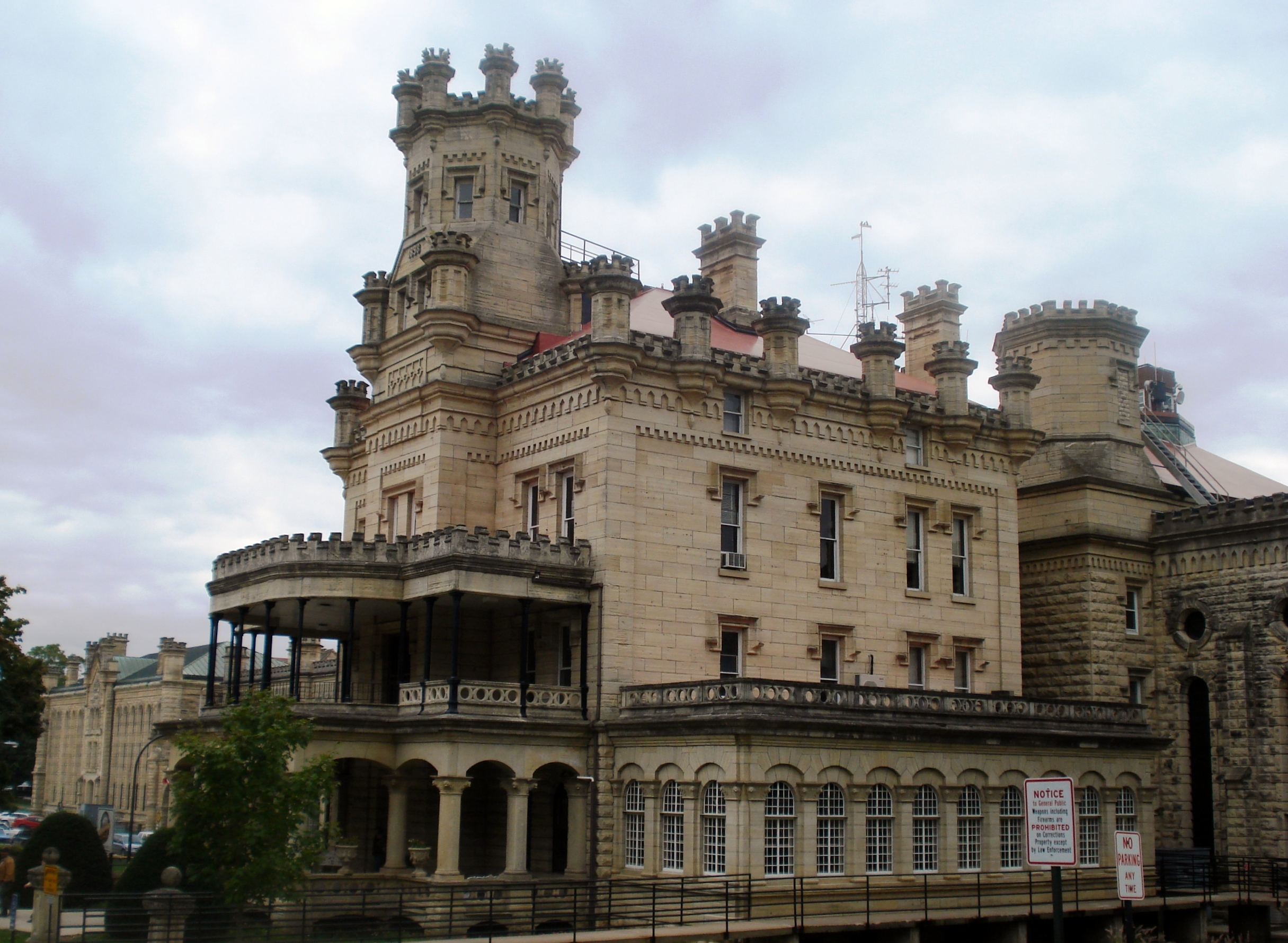

- Location within Iowa Location within the United States
- Location: N. High St. Anamosa, Iowa
- Built: 1875–1899
- Architect: Foster, William; Liebbe, Henry Franz; 1877; 1907
- Architectural style: Gothic Revival; Scottish Baronial Revival
- NRHP reference No.: 92001667
- Added to NRHP: 18 December 1992

Anamosa State Penitentiary is a Medium/Maximum security penitentiary prison located in the Jones County community of Anamosa, Iowa – approximately 25 miles (40 km) northeast of Cedar Rapids, Iowa.

== Building ==
The building was commissioned in 1872 by the 14th Iowa General Assembly, as the site of the "Additional Penitentiary", and a commission of three men was established to complete the task. Having purchased a suitable site, covering 11 acres, and a quarry from which to obtain the building stone, forced-labour for the construction process was imported in the Spring of 1873 in the form of 20 prisoners from Fort Madison. The architects were William Foster (1842-1909) and Henry Franz Liebbe (1851-1927), who produced an unusual design in the Scottish Baronial Revival style, the building having "massive outer walls and crenelated towers that give it the appearance of a medieval fortress". The entrance to the central block, known as the "Administration Building" is guarded ceremonially by stone statues of lions. The prison came into operation in 1874.

== Prison operations ==
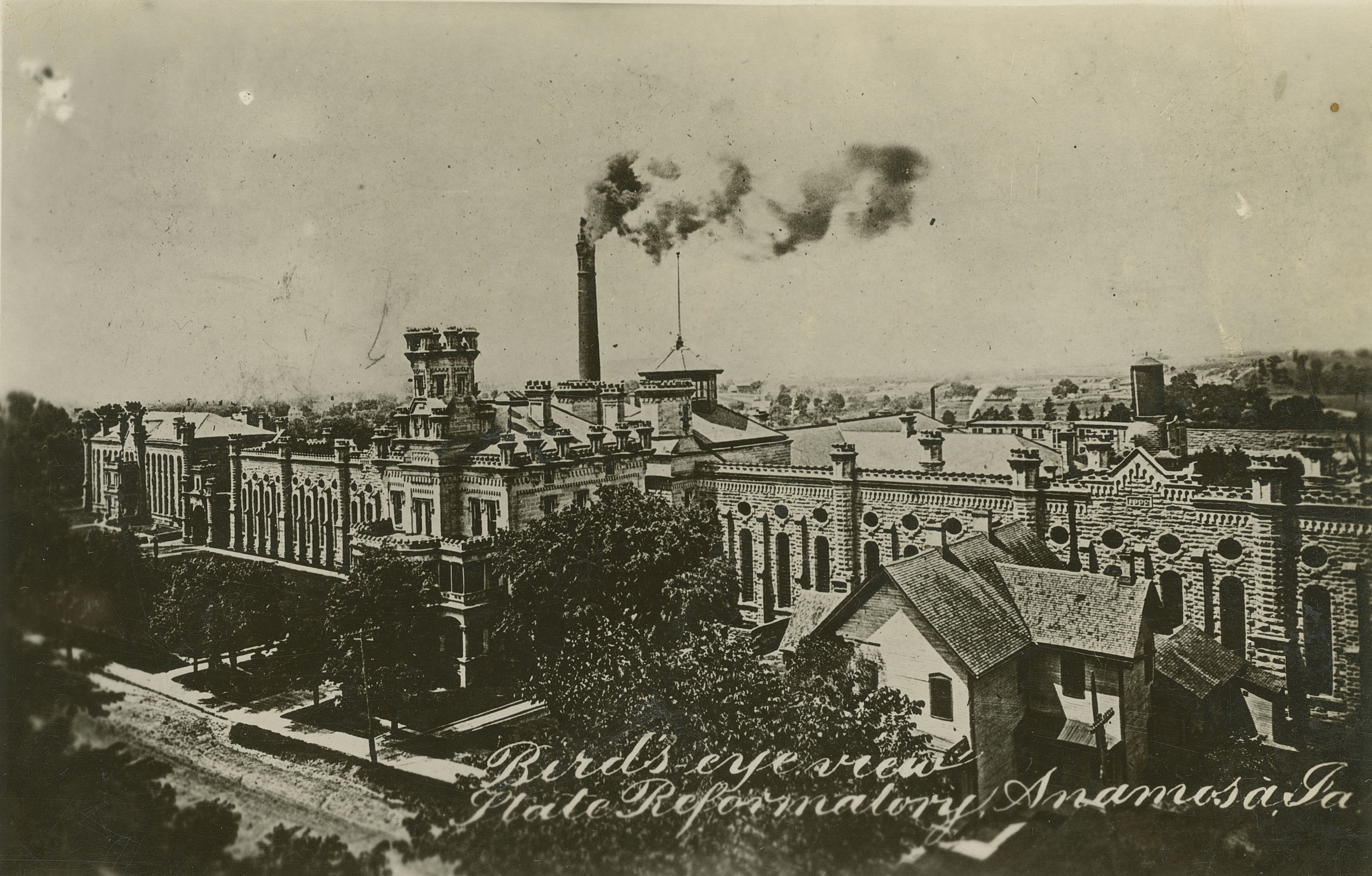
Anamosa State Penitentiary, 1911

As of February 21, 2016, the penitentiary was home to approximately 855 inmates, with another 175 in segregation, and had a staff of 357. Inmates working in the Iowa Prison Industries produce metal stamping, custom wood, printing, metal furniture, signage, and cleaning products at the penitentiary. The penitentiary also offers educational services through a community college with which it has a contract. The prison offers vocational training in welding, automobile repair, horticulture, and janitorial work. Inmates may also take courses in order to earn a high school diploma or a GED, or in order to earn credits towards an Associate of Arts degree. The prison also offers substance abuse treatment programs for those inmates with drug and/or alcohol problems.

Supporting the Treatment and Security functions of the prison, there is also a comprehensive program of religious services, physical, and creative activities.

A.S.P. Religion Center: This offers an expanding variety of services, programs, and studies from multiple faith groups. These include (listed alphabetically): Asatru, Buddhist, Christian (Catholic, Liturgical Protestant, Pentecostal & Gospel), Jehovah's Witnesses, Moorish Science Temple of America, Muslim (Sunni), Nation of Gods and Earths, Native American sacred ceremonies, Satanist, and Wicca. The program is supported by 60+ regular volunteers who are clergy and lay authorities in their various faith groups.

Activity areas also allow inmates to be positively occupied in various team sports through the gym. The hobby/craft area allows them to work with creative arts and crafts such as pottery, leather work, and woodworking. Finally, the music department provides an opportunity to be involved in the performing arts as soloists or in small bands.

All of the ancillary programs (Religion, Sports, Music, and Hobby Craft) seek to support generally positive interactions between individuals, establish a sense of teamwork that supports Treatment and Security goals.

The penitentiary also maintains a satellite minimum security institution for up to 80 inmates at the Luster Heights Prison Farm. This is located in the northeastern corner of the state in the Yellow River State Forest near Harpers Ferry, all in Allamakee County.

The prison also has a golf course which was built by John Wayne Gacy in the late 1960s. The prison also had a Jaycees chapter, led by Gacy during his initial sentence for sodomy.

== Anamosa State Penitentiary Museum ==
The Anamosa State Penitentiary Museum is located just outside the penitentiary's walls in a stone building that was formerly a barn and then a cheese-making facility for the prison. Exhibits include the history of the prison, the role of prison guards and the construction of the buildings. The museum is open seasonally and features a gift shop.

== Notable inmates ==
- Jerry Lynn Burns, convicted killer of Michelle Martinko
- John Wayne Gacy, serial killer, served time here, from 1968 to 1970, for sodomy with a minor.
- Harry Edward Greenwell, posthumously identified as the "I-65 Killer." Served time here for burglary and escape in 1982.
- Robert Hansen, serial killer, served time here for arson in the early 1960s.
- Chai Vang, mass murderer who shot and killed six people and injured two in Meteor, Wisconsin on 21 November 2004.
- Warren John Nutter, murderer, served time here from 1957 to around 1962.

== See also ==
- List of Iowa state prisons
