= Ellsworth Ranch Bridge =

- U.S. National Register of Historic Places
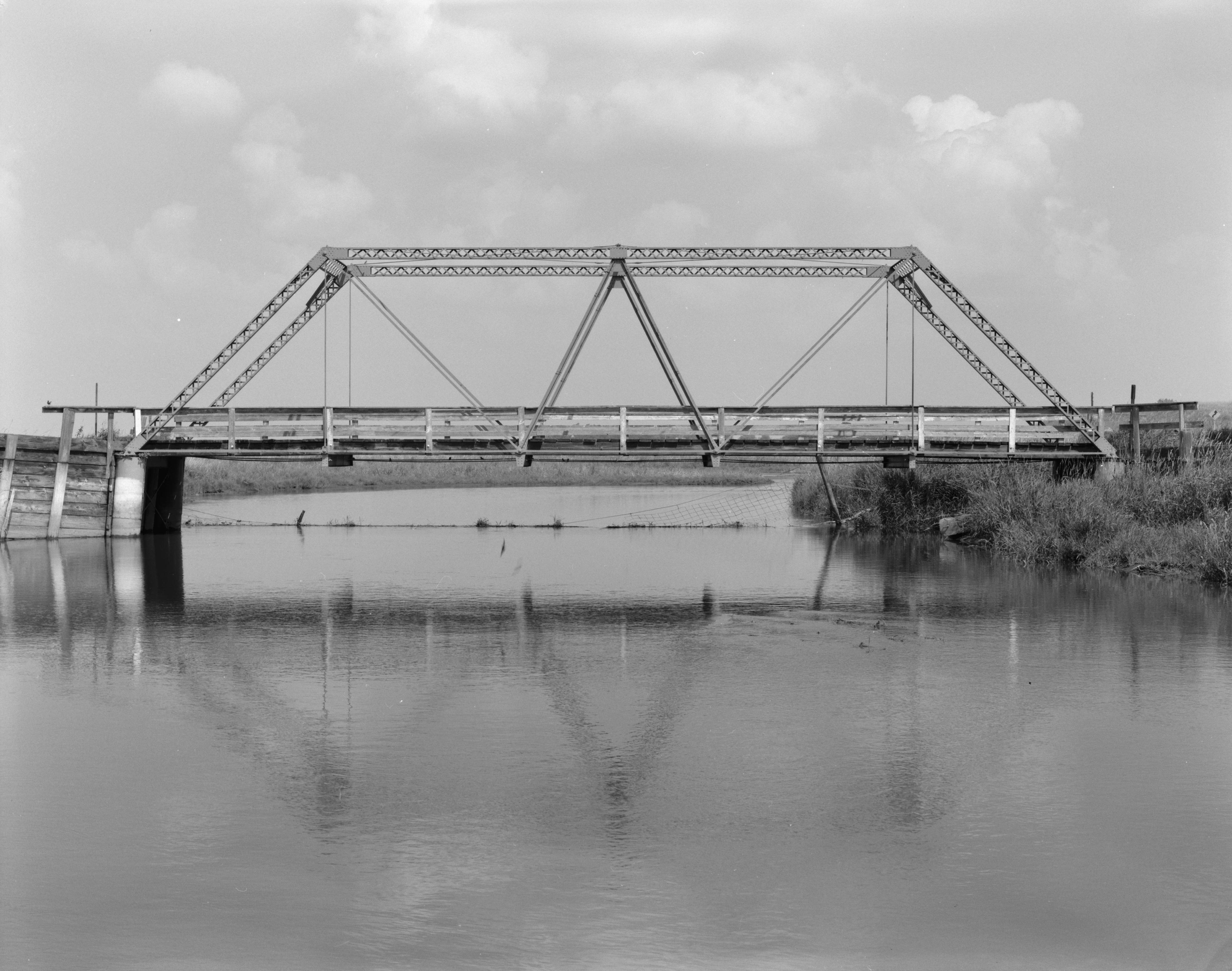

- Location within Iowa Location within the United States
- Location: 130th Street over the East Fork of the Des Moines River
- Nearest city: Armstrong, Iowa
- Coordinates: 43°27′36″N 94°34′49″W
- Area: less than one acre
- Built: 1895
- Architect: King Bridge Company
- Architectural style: Pratt/Warren through truss
- MPS: Highway Bridges of Iowa MPS
- NRHP reference No.: 98000869
- Added to NRHP: July 15, 1998

Ellsworth Ranch Bridge is a truss bridge located 7 miles (11 km) northwest of Armstrong in rural Emmet County, Iowa, United States. The Emmet County Board of Supervisors received a petition in January 1895 for a bridge across the East Fork of the Des Moines River in Lincoln Township. They gave their approval in April of the same year, and in May the board adopted the plans of the King Bridge Company of Cleveland, Ohio. However, they rejected all the bids as too high, so they reduced the length of the span from 100 feet (30 m) to 80 feet (24 m). King won the contract for this and two other bridges for $3,400. The Ellsworth Ranch Bridge was completed later in 1895. The bridge includes elements of both the Pratt and Warren configurations in its single span. A minor reconstruction was completed in 1937, and it was listed on the National Register of Historic Places in 1998.

== See also ==
- List of bridges documented by the Historic American Engineering Record in Iowa
