= Thomas Reburn Polygonal Barn =

- U.S. National Register of Historic Places
- The barn in 2020

- Location within Iowa Location within the United States
- Location: Off Iowa Highway 26; New Albin, Iowa
- Coordinates: 43°29′30.5″N 91°18′13.1″W
- Area: less than one acre
- Built: 1914
- MPS: Iowa Round Barns: The Sixty Year Experiment TR
- NRHP reference No.: 86001413
- Added to NRHP: June 30, 1986

The Thomas Reburn Polygonal Barn is an historic building located near New Albin in rural Allamakee County, Iowa, United States. It was built in 1914 as a beef cattle barn. The building measures 46 feet (14 m) in diameter. It is a 12-sided structure that features red vertical siding and a silo that extends one story through the roof. It is one of four known barns in the round barn genre that was built with a flat or near flat roof in Iowa. It has been listed on the National Register of Historic Places since 1986.
