= Iron Post =

- U.S. National Register of Historic Places

- Location within Iowa Location within the United States
- Location: Northern end of Main St. New Albin, Iowa
- Coordinates: 43°30′03″N 91°16′59″W
- Area: 1 acre (0.40 ha)
- Built: 1849
- Architect: A. Dowling
- NRHP reference No.: 76000732
- Added to NRHP: September 29, 1976

Iron Post is a historic boundary marker located in New Albin, Iowa, United States. An Act of Congress on March 3, 1849, sought to resolve the boundary issue between the State of Iowa and the newly established Minnesota Territory. This cast iron post was placed here by Captain Thomas Lee of the U.S. Army Corps of Topographical Engineers. He determined that North latitude 43 degrees, 30 minutes was indeed the border between the two entities, which the United States Congress had designated on August 4, 1846, as Iowa's northern border. It also served as a correction for the townships that had been established below the line, and as a practical surveying base for the territory to the north from this point all the way to the Big Sioux River.

The post is an obelisk that rises 54 inches (1.4 m). It is painted an aluminium color, and bears inscriptions on its four faces: "Iowa" (south), "Minesota" [sic] (north), "1849" (east), and "Lat 43 degrees 30 minutes" (west). It was brought here across the frozen Mississippi River from Victory, Wisconsin by John Ross on a sled pulled by a team of oxen. The post was listed on the National Register of Historic Places in 1976.
