= Merriam Street Bridge =

Bridge in Minnesota

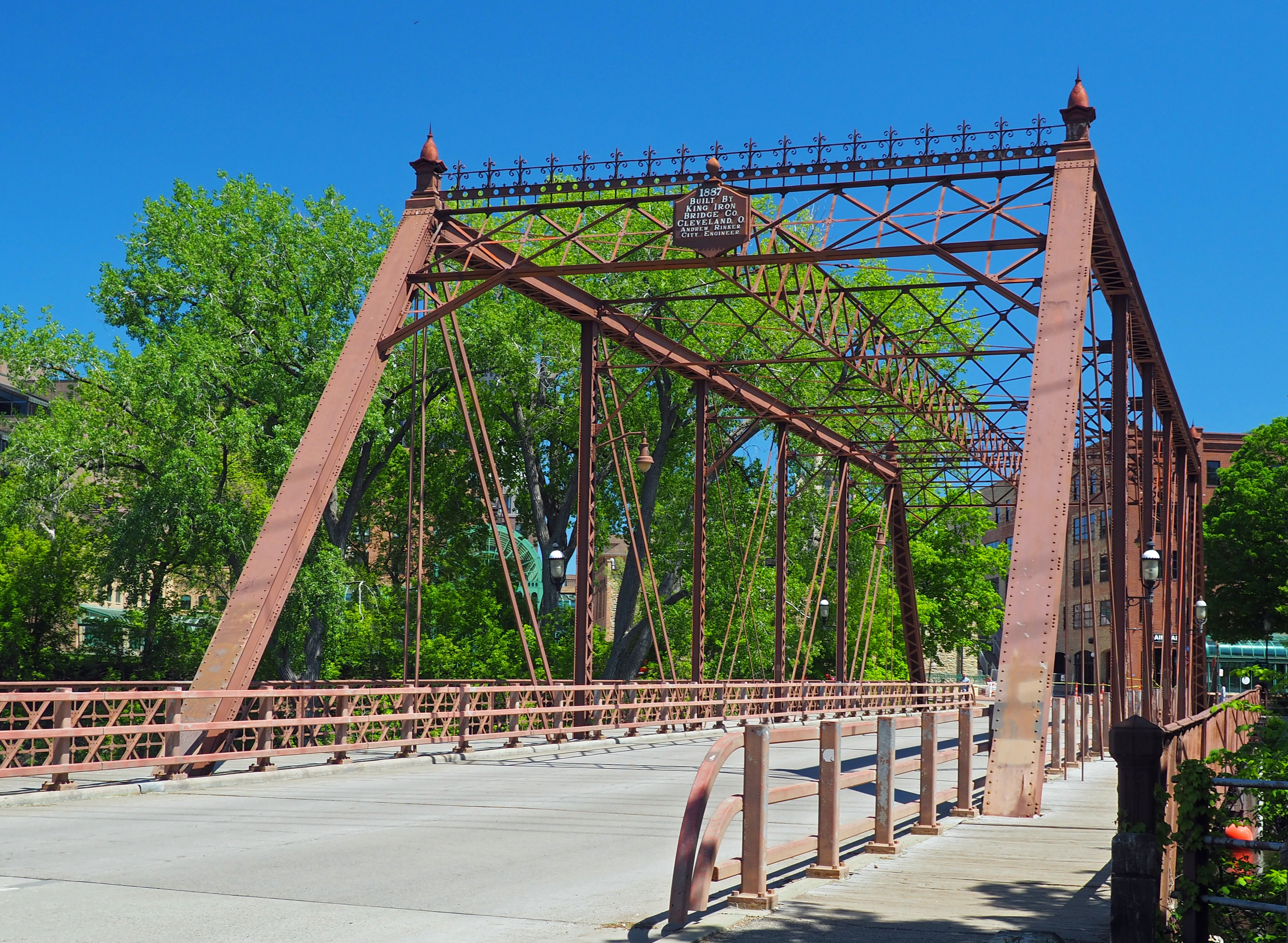
- Merriam Street Bridge from the west
- Coordinates: 44°59′9″N 93°15′35″W
- Carries: Two lanes of Merriam Street
- Crosses: East channel of the Mississippi River
- Locale: Minneapolis
- Maintained by: City of Minneapolis
- ID number: 27664

Characteristics
- Design: Truss bridge
- Total length: 256.7 feet
- Width: 34 feet
- Longest span: 147 feet
- Clearance below: 14 feet

History
- Engineering design by: Andrew Rinker
- Opened: 1887 as part of the Broadway Avenue Bridge; moved to current location in 1987

Statistics
- Daily traffic: 1077 vehicles per day

Merriam Street Bridge is a truss bridge that spans the east channel of the Mississippi River between Nicollet Island and the east bank of the river in Minneapolis. The bridge was originally built in 1887 by King Iron Bridge Company as one of the four spans of the Broadway Avenue Bridge. When the Broadway Avenue Bridge was reconstructed in 1987, one span was preserved and moved to Nicollet Island. The truss span is actually decorative; the bridge is supported by a beam from underneath.

The original Broadway Avenue Bridge was one of the fanciest bridges on the Mississippi River. It featured finials on each top corner and a band of scrolls, crosses, and lines between them. The horizontal struts and guard railings used X-shapes as a pattern. Each end of the bridge has a hexagonal cast iron plate embossed with the date and the designer of the bridge. The bridge now serves as a connector between parkland on Nicollet Island and the Saint Anthony Main development on the east bank, allowing opportunities for visitors to stroll across the river.

== Gallery ==
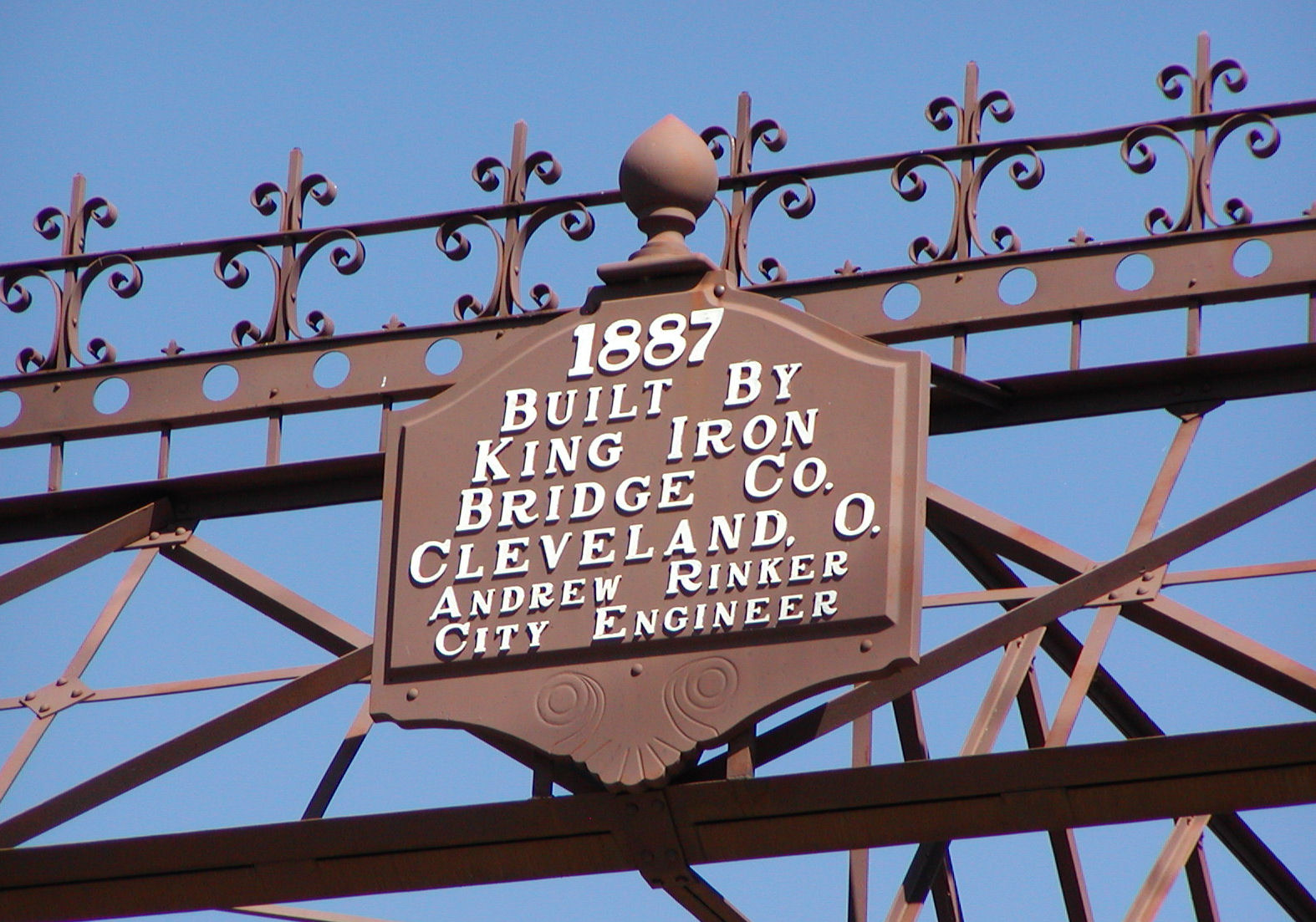
Plaque above bridge

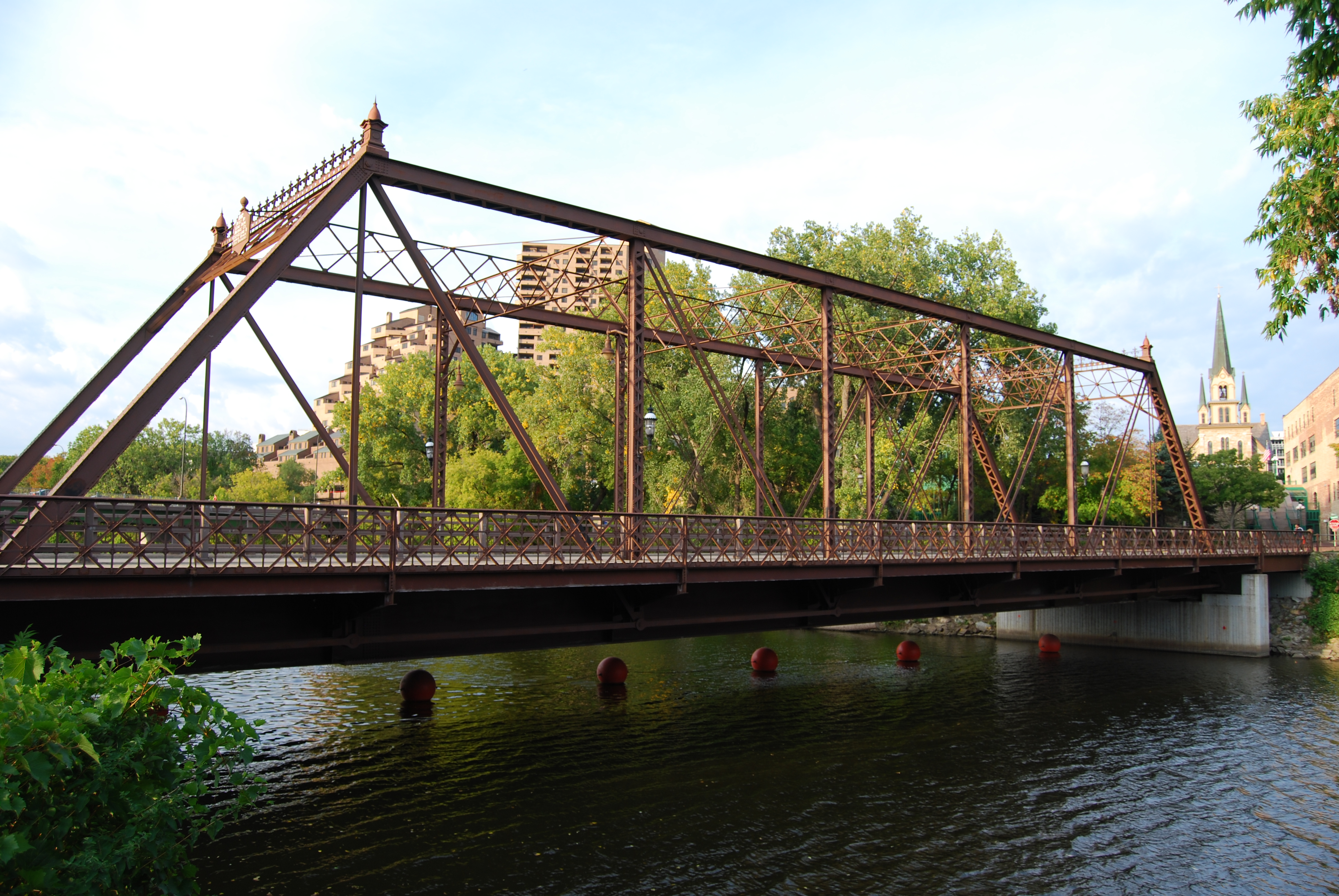
Side view, from Nicollet Island
