= Clear Creek Bridge =

Historic bridge in Nebraska, United States

- U.S. National Register of Historic Places
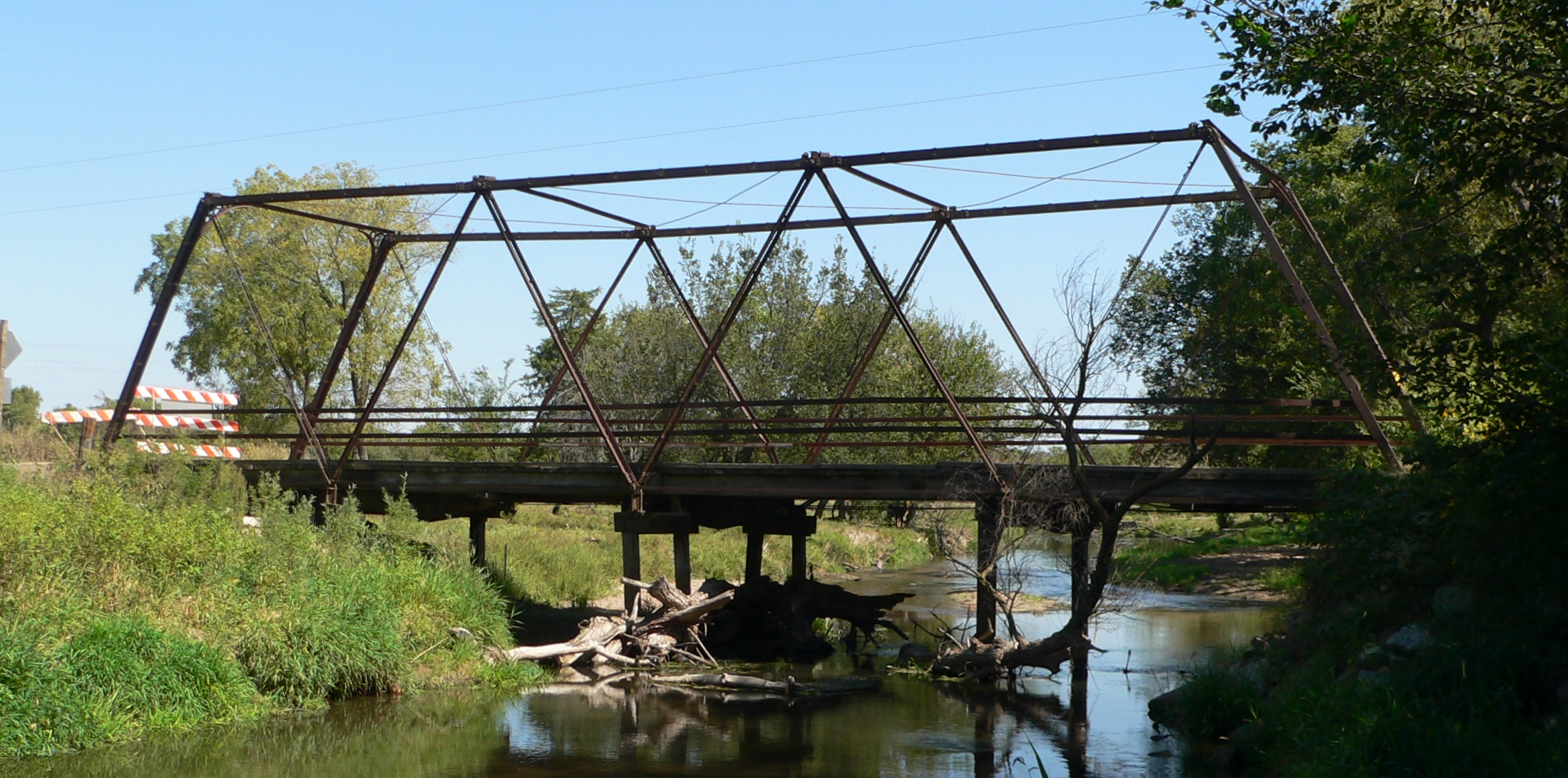

- Location within Nebraska Location within the United States
- Nearest city: Bellwood, Nebraska
- Coordinates: 41°23′03″N 97°20′06″W
- Area: less than one acre
- Built: 1891
- Built by: King Bridge Co.; CRM Co.
- Architectural style: Warren through truss
- MPS: Highway Bridges in Nebraska MPS
- NRHP reference No.: 92000734
- Added to NRHP: June 29, 1992

The Clear Creek Bridge, in Butler County, Nebraska, near Bellwood, Nebraska, was built in 1891. It is a Warren through truss bridge. It was listed on the National Register of Historic Places in 1992.

It is a 73 feet (22 m) single-span bridge. It was designed and built by the King Bridge Co. of Cleveland, Ohio; it was fabricated by the CRM Co.

Its 1991 National Register nomination noted that "the bridge's integrity has been diminished by later alterations, [but] this fact is mitigated by the structure's extreme rarity and age. Among Nebraska's oldest vehicular spans, the crossing continues to carry vehicular traffic." In 2010, the bridge was blocked off and no longer carried traffic.

It brings a township road over Clear Creek about 5.8 miles (9.3 km) northwest of Bellwood.
