= Adel Bridge =

Historic bridge in Iowa, United States

- U.S. National Register of Historic Places
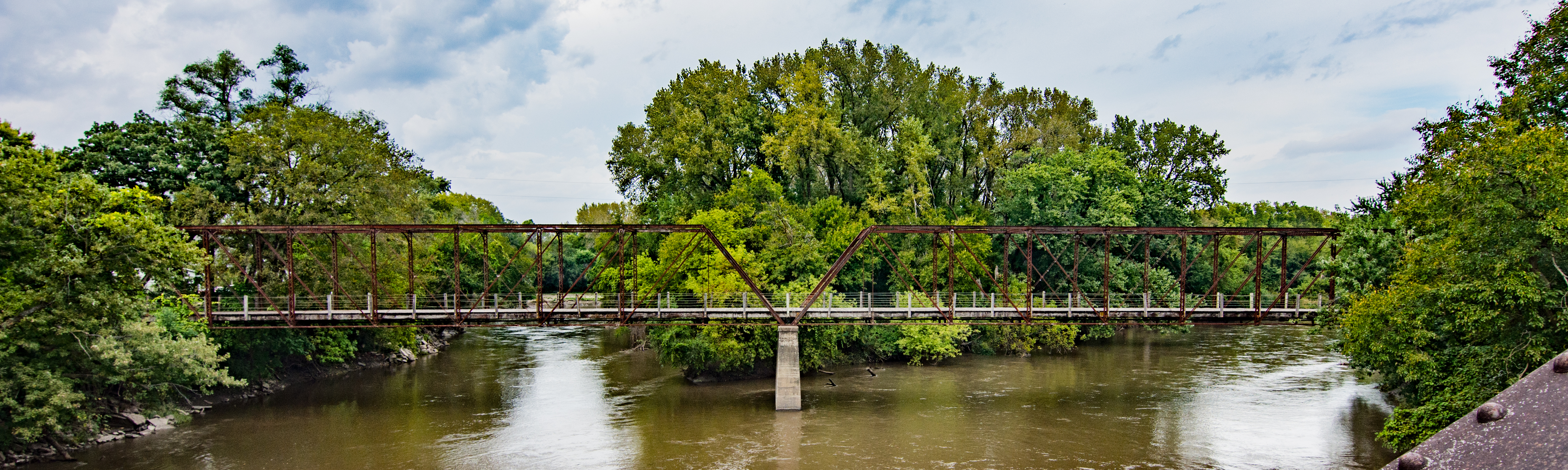
- View from adjacent Raccoon River Trail bridge

- Location within Iowa Location within the United States
- Location: River St. Adel, Iowa
- Coordinates: 41°36′57″N 94°0′43″W
- Area: less than one acre
- Built: 1882
- Built by: King Iron Bridge and Manufacturing
- Architectural style: Pratt through truss
- MPS: Highway Bridges of Iowa MPS
- NRHP reference No.: 02000374
- Added to NRHP: April 18, 2002

The Adel Bridge is located on the east edge of Adel, Iowa, United States. The bridge was constructed in 1882. The 400-foot (120 m) span carried traffic on River Street over the Raccoon River. The Dallas County Board of Supervisors received a petition to replace a deteriorating bridge at this location. The old bridge had been built where ferry service had been initiated in 1850, three years after the town had been established. They contracted with the King Iron Bridge and Manufacturing of Cleveland to build the two-span Pratt through truss bridge for $12,500. It was a primary river crossing into Adel until 1932 when the U.S. Highway 6 bridge was completed not far to the south. While it remains in place, it was closed to vehicular traffic in 2000. The bridge was listed on the National Register of Historic Places in 2002.

== Photo gallery ==
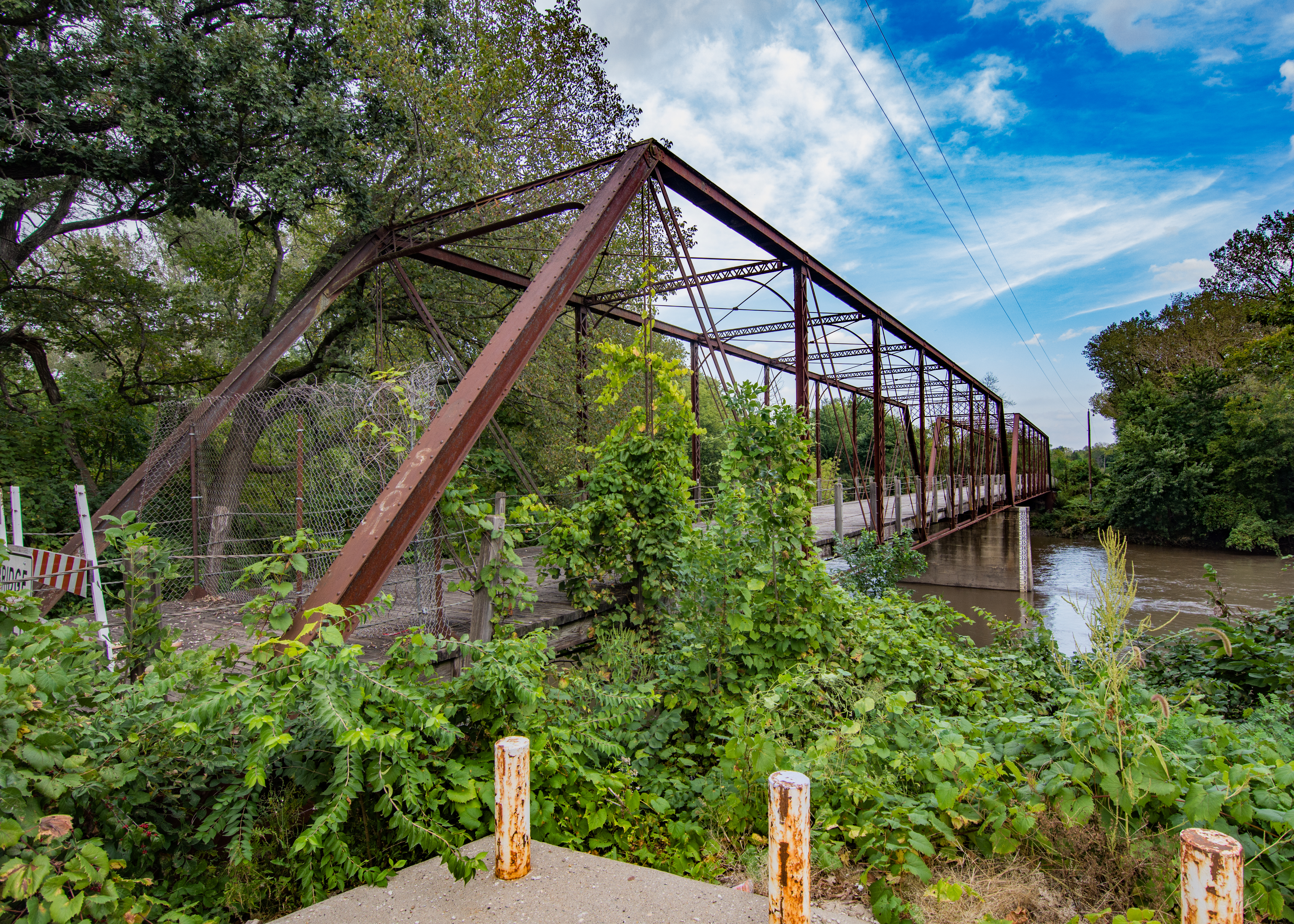

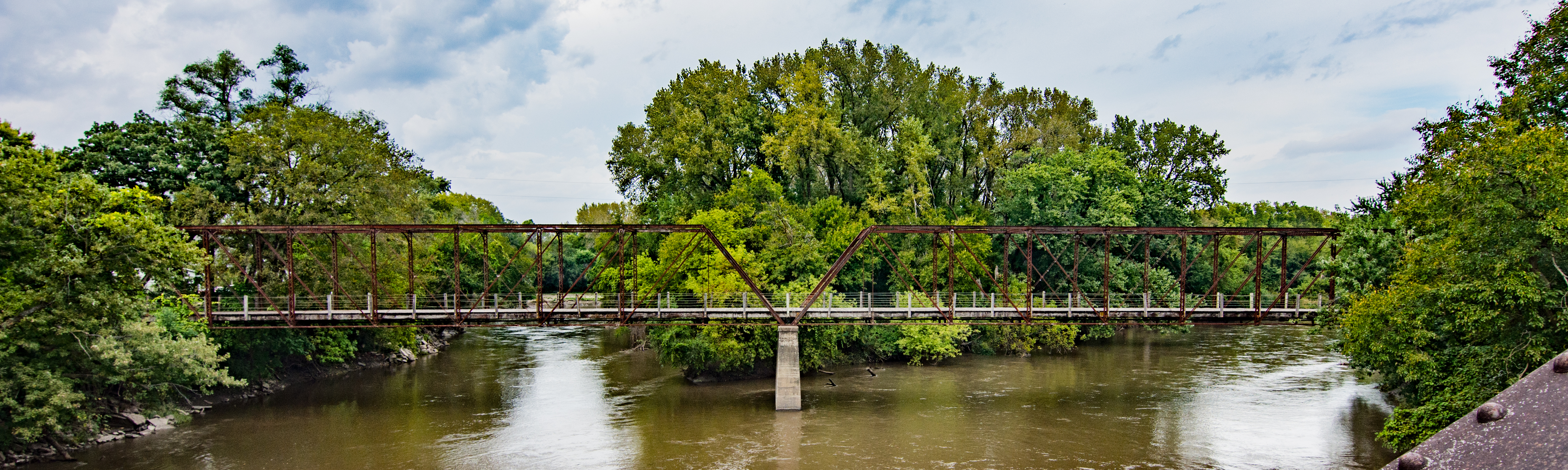
