= Luster Heights Prison Farm =

Minimum-security prison in Iowa, United States

Coordinates: 43°08′20″N 91°11′08″W

Luster Heights Prison Farm was a satellite facility of Anamosa State Penitentiary and operated by the Iowa Department of Corrections. It was located in the Yellow River State Forest about five miles south of Harpers Ferry. It was situated in Fairview Township, in southeastern Allamakee County. The minimum-security facility housed approximately 60 male inmates, with a capacity of 88.

The inmates did work for the Iowa Department of Natural Resources in maintaining the state forest. In particular, they worked at a DNR-owned sawmill. In 2006, the Animal Welfare Foundation of Iowa started a program at the facility for inmates to train stray dogs for later adoption.

The facility closed in 2017 and the buildings were demolished. The land was later purchased by the U.S. Fish and Wildlife Service.

== Sources ==
=== Web sources ===
- Iowa Department of Corrections
- Daily prisoner counts
- U.S. Geological Survey Geographic Names Information System: Luster Heights Prison Farm
- Yellow River State Forest
- Sawmill
- Prison dog adoption program
