= Iowa Township, Allamakee County, Iowa =

Township in Iowa, US

Iowa Township, Allamakee County
- Township
- Coordinates: 43°28′19″N 091°17′49″W
- Country: United States
- State: Iowa
- County: Allamakee

Area
  - Total: 37.31 sq mi (96.64 km^{2})
  - Land: 34.51 sq mi (89.38 km^{2})
  - Water: 2.80 sq mi (7.25 km^{2})
- Elevation: 636 ft (194 m)

Population (2010)
  - Total: 744
  - Density: 21/sq mi (8.3/km^{2})
- Time zone: UTC-6 (CST)
  - Summer (DST): UTC-5 (CDT)
- FIPS code: 19-92049
- GNIS feature ID: 0468076

Iowa Township is one of eighteen townships in Allamakee County, Iowa, USA. At the 2010 census, its population was 744.

== History ==
Iowa Township was organized in 1855.

== Geography ==
Iowa Township occupies the extreme northeast corner of the state of Iowa. The township covers an area of 37.31 square miles (96.6 km^{2}) and contains one settlement, New Albin. According to the USGS, it contains three cemeteries: Holy Cross, New Albin and Saint Peters.
