= Lansing Stone School =

- U.S. National Register of Historic Places
- The school in 2020

- Location within Iowa Location within the United States
- Location: Southwestern corner of Center and 5th Sts. Lansing, Iowa
- Coordinates: 43°21′38″N 91°13′16″W
- Area: Less than one acre
- Built: 1864
- NRHP reference No.: 73000721
- Added to NRHP: December 18, 1973

Lansing Stone School is a historic building located in Lansing, Iowa, United States. The two-story structure was constructed in 1864 using locally quarried limestone. The cupola on the center front of the building is original. The building was enlarged in 1867 when the wings on the north and south sides were added. It served as a school building for 108 years. It was listed on the National Register of Historic Places in 1973.
