= Quarry Bridge =

- U.S. National Register of Historic Places
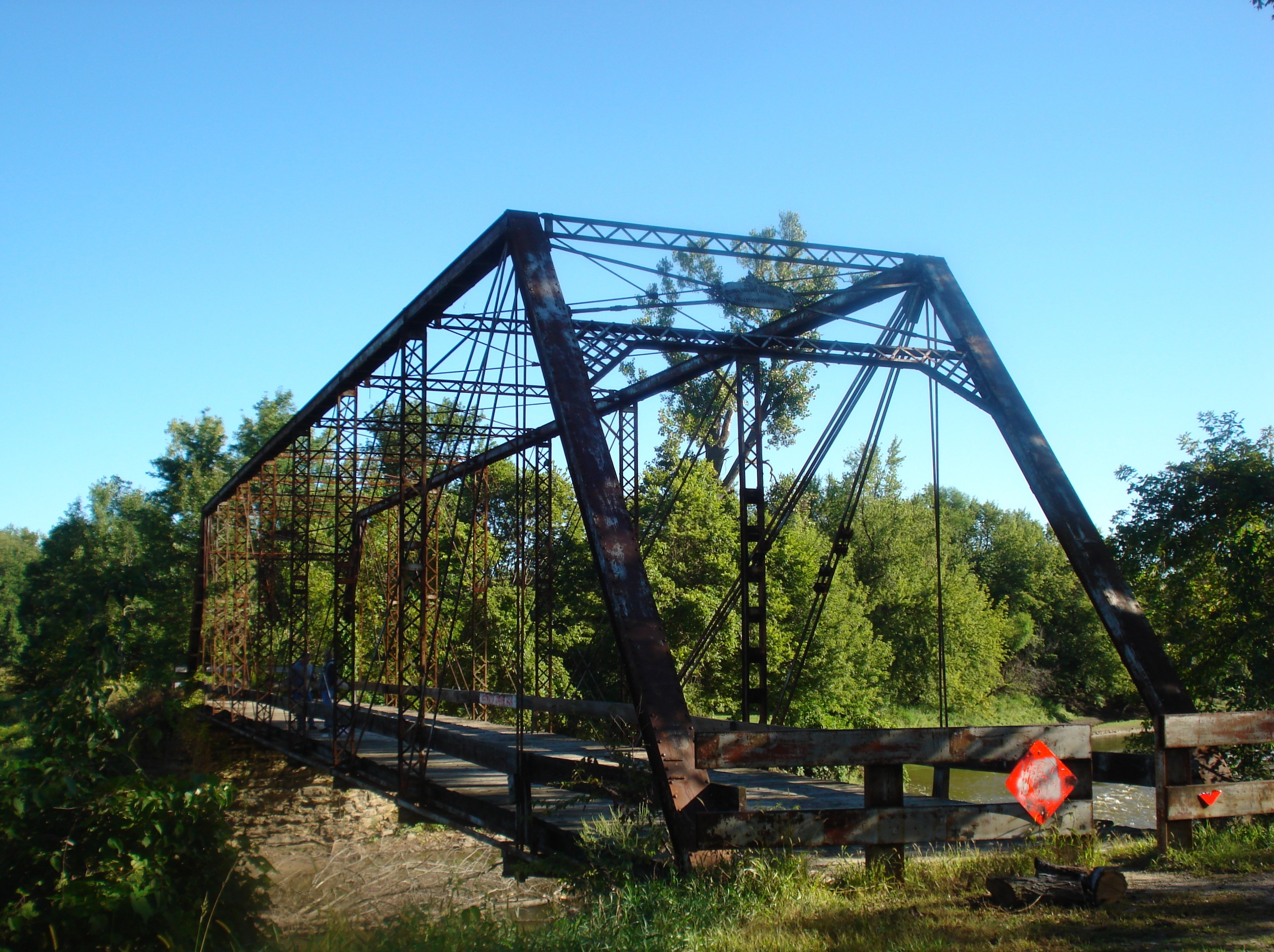
- Quarry Bridge

- Location within Iowa Location within the United States
- Location: County Road I-4 over the Iowa River
- Nearest city: Quarry, Iowa
- Coordinates: 42°1′35″N 92°48′29″W
- Built: 1885
- Architect: King Bridge Co. of Cleveland, Ohio
- Architectural style: Pin-connected Whipple through truss
- NRHP reference No.: 98000498
- Added to NRHP: May 15, 1998

The Quarry Bridge is located near Quarry, Iowa in Marshall County, Iowa. The bridge is also called the Iowa River Bridge. It was built in 1885 and has been listed on the National Register of Historic Places since 1998.

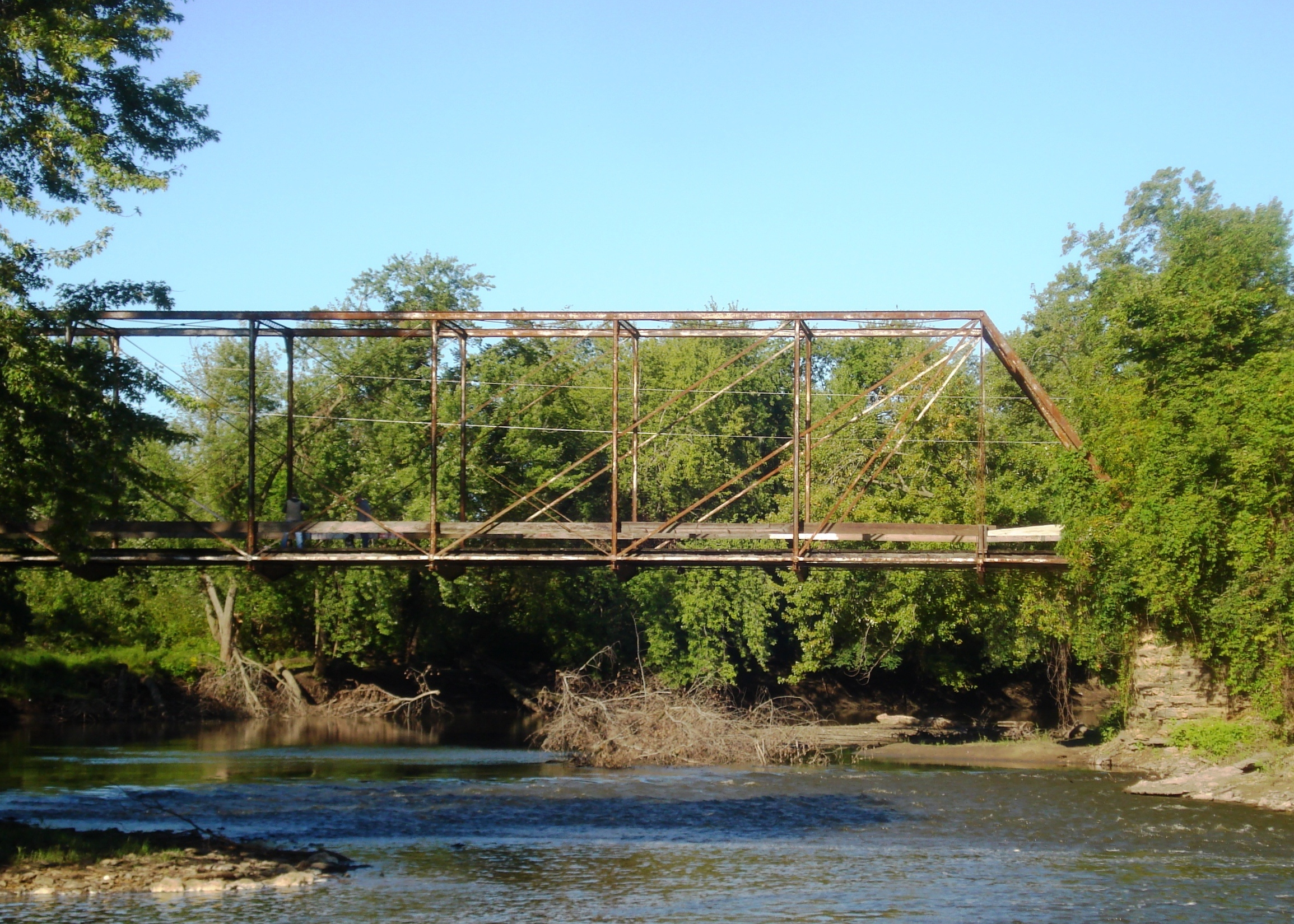
Quarry Bridge over the Iowa River

The superstructure of the bridge was fabricated by the King Iron Bridge Company of Cleveland, Ohio. The builders completed the bridge in September 1885 at a cost of $3,295. The total length of the bridge is 149.9 feet (45.7 m). The deck width is 16.1 feet (4.9 m). The vertical clearance above the deck is 14.2 feet (4.3 m).

== See also ==
- Le Grand Bridge (1896), nearby, also NRHP-listed
- Le Grand Bridge (1914)
