= Lansing Fisheries Building =

- U.S. National Register of Historic Places
- The building in 2020

- Location within Iowa Location within the United States
- Location: Between County Highway X-52 and the Mississippi River in southern Lansing
- Coordinates: 43°21′38″N 91°12′49″W
- Area: Less than one acre
- Built: 1915
- Architect: Iowa State Fish and Game Warden
- MPS: Conservation Movement in Iowa MPS
- NRHP reference No.: 91001832
- Added to NRHP: December 23, 1991

Lansing Fisheries Building, also known as the Lansing Fish Hatchery/Lansing Fish Rescue Station, is a historic building located in Lansing, Iowa, United States. Lansing was long associated with fish rescue work along the Mississippi River. Fish would get caught in the backwaters and would suffocate when the water levels dropped or froze to death in the shallow waters in winter. Rescued fish would either be redeposited in the river or transported inland to stock streams and lakes by the State Fish and Game Warden (after 1931 the Iowa Fish and Game Commission, and after 1935 the State Conservation Commission).

This building was constructed by the Iowa State Fish and Game Warden in 1915 as a headquarters for fish rescue, and as a fish hatchery. The facility was along the Chicago, Milwaukee and St. Paul Railroad tracks, and it and other railroads in the state would transport fish for the state for a nominal fee in specially designed cars for stocking purposes. In the 1930s the Lansing facility became the headquarters for fish management in eastern Iowa. Rescue efforts were discontinued in the 1940s, but the facility remained a hatchery into the late 1970s. Luther College leased the building in 1981 for an onsite laboratory. Beginning in 1984 the Lansing chapter of the Veterans of Foreign Wars began leasing the building. It was listed on the National Register of Historic Places in 1991.
