= G. Kerndt and Brothers Elevator and Warehouses, No. 11, No.12 and No. 13 =

- U.S. National Register of Historic Places
- U.S. Historic district – Contributing property
- The complex in 2020

- Location within Iowa Location within the United States
- Location: Front St. Lansing, Iowa
- Coordinates: 43°21′43″N 91°12′52″W
- Area: Less than one acre
- Built: 1868, 1890
- Part of: Lansing Main Street Historic District (ID14000624)
- NRHP reference No.: 79000881
- Added to NRHP: October 18, 1979

G. Kerndt and Brothers Elevator and Warehouses, No. 11, No.12 and No. 13 is a historic complex located in Lansing, Iowa, United States. The four Kerndt brothers were all German immigrants who settled in the Lansing area by 1854. Gustav, William and Mortiz established a broom factory and cigar business in town while Herman farmed and provided the broom corn for the factory. A fifth brother, Julian, died shortly after arriving in Iowa. They built their first grain warehouse in the late 1850s. In 1861 they began their general store, which would in time include private banking as a part of their mercantile business. In 1908 it was incorporated by the family as the Kerndt Brothers Savings Bank.

The first floor on the north side of this building was completed in 1868, and was known as warehouses 11 and 12. The elevator portion of the building was added in 1890. It is the upper portion with the gable roof. Warehouse 13 is the section on the south side of the building that projects forward. The main floor of the building is brick, and built on a basement of native limestone. The basement is exposed in the back, and it extends to the edge of the Mississippi River. The upper section where the grain elevator was located is a frame structure that was originally faced with corrugated metal. At the time of its nomination the grain elevator machinery was still in place. The building now houses several different commercial enterprises. It was listed on the National Register of Historic Places in 1979, and it was included as a contributing property in the Lansing Main Street Historic District in 2014.
