= Hager–Mead House =

Historic house in Massachusetts, United States

- U.S. National Register of Historic Places
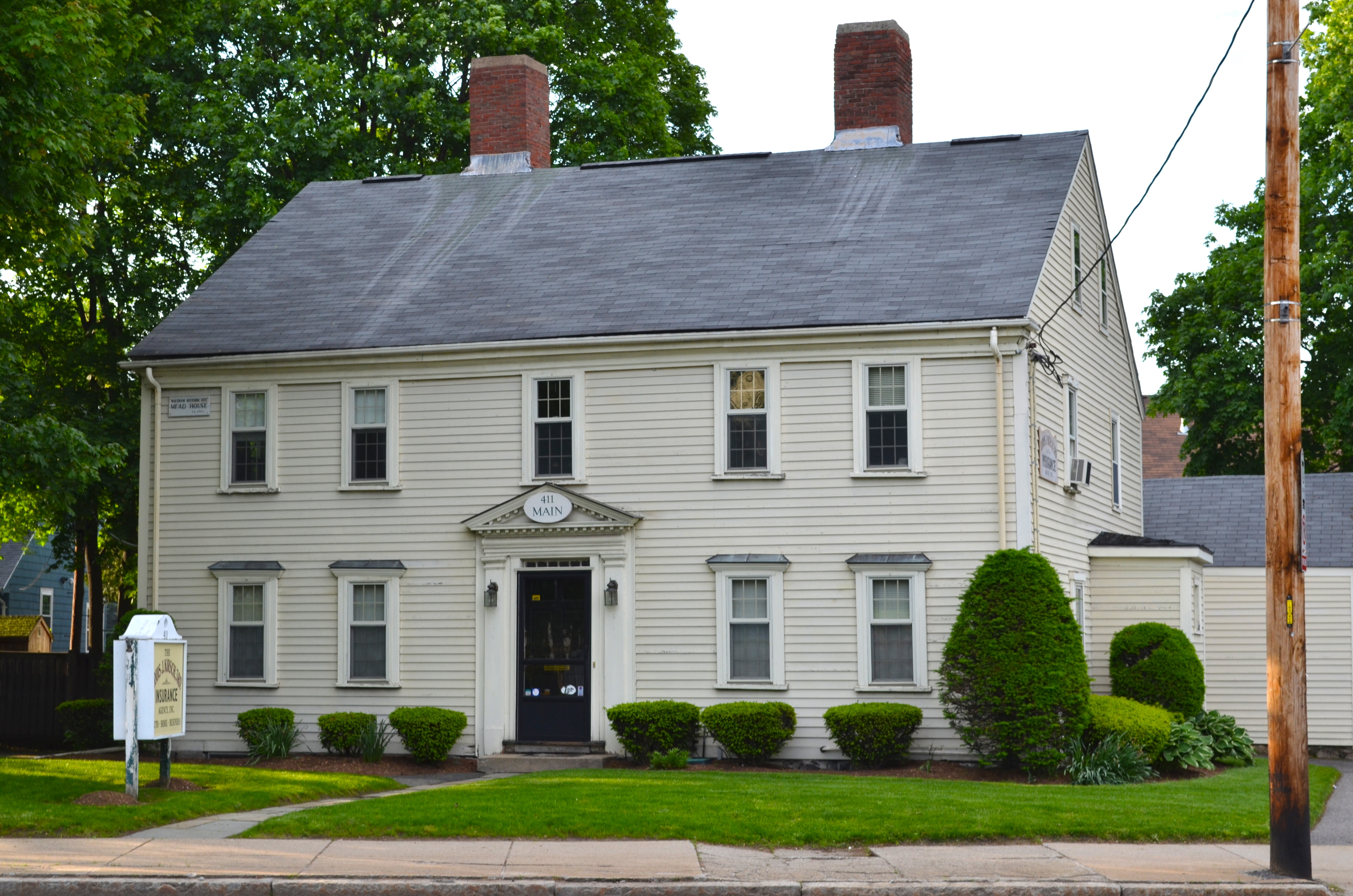

- Location within Massachusetts Location within the United States
- Location: 411 Main St., Waltham, Massachusetts
- Coordinates: 42°22′40″N 71°13′38″W
- Built: 1795
- Architectural style: Georgian
- MPS: Waltham MRA
- NRHP reference No.: 89001572
- Added to NRHP: September 28, 1989

The Hager–Mead House is a historic house at 411 Main Street in Waltham, Massachusetts. The 2 1/2-story wood-frame house was built in 1795, and is one of the city's small number of 18th-century houses. It is five bays wide and two deep, with chimneys set in the ridge, and a center entry flanked by Doric pilasters and topped by a six-pane transom window and modillioned cornice. The house was built by Samuel Hager, a farmer from Watertown, who promptly sold it Stephen Mead, a blacksmith, in 1796.

The house was listed on the National Register of Historic Places in 1989.

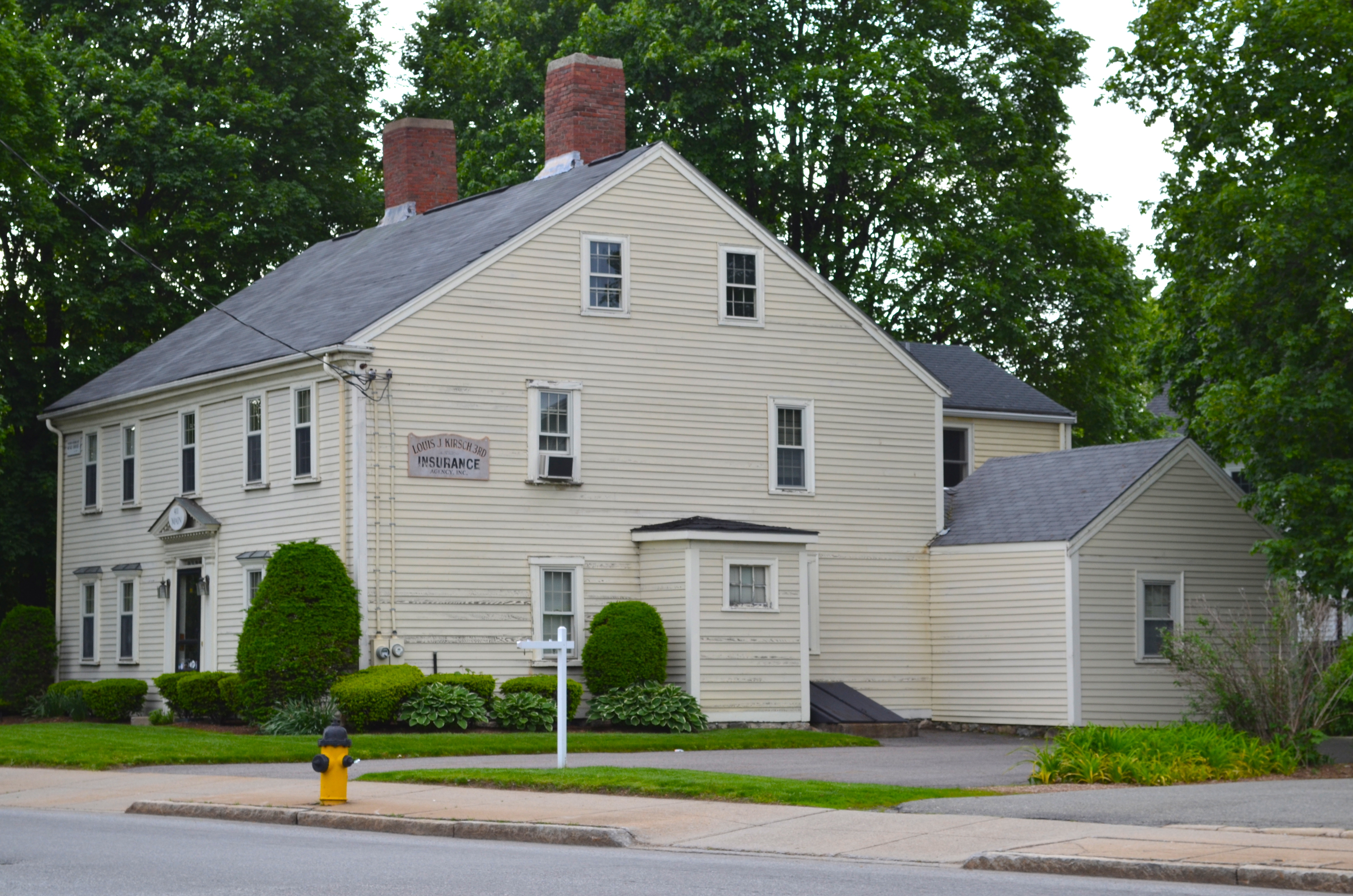

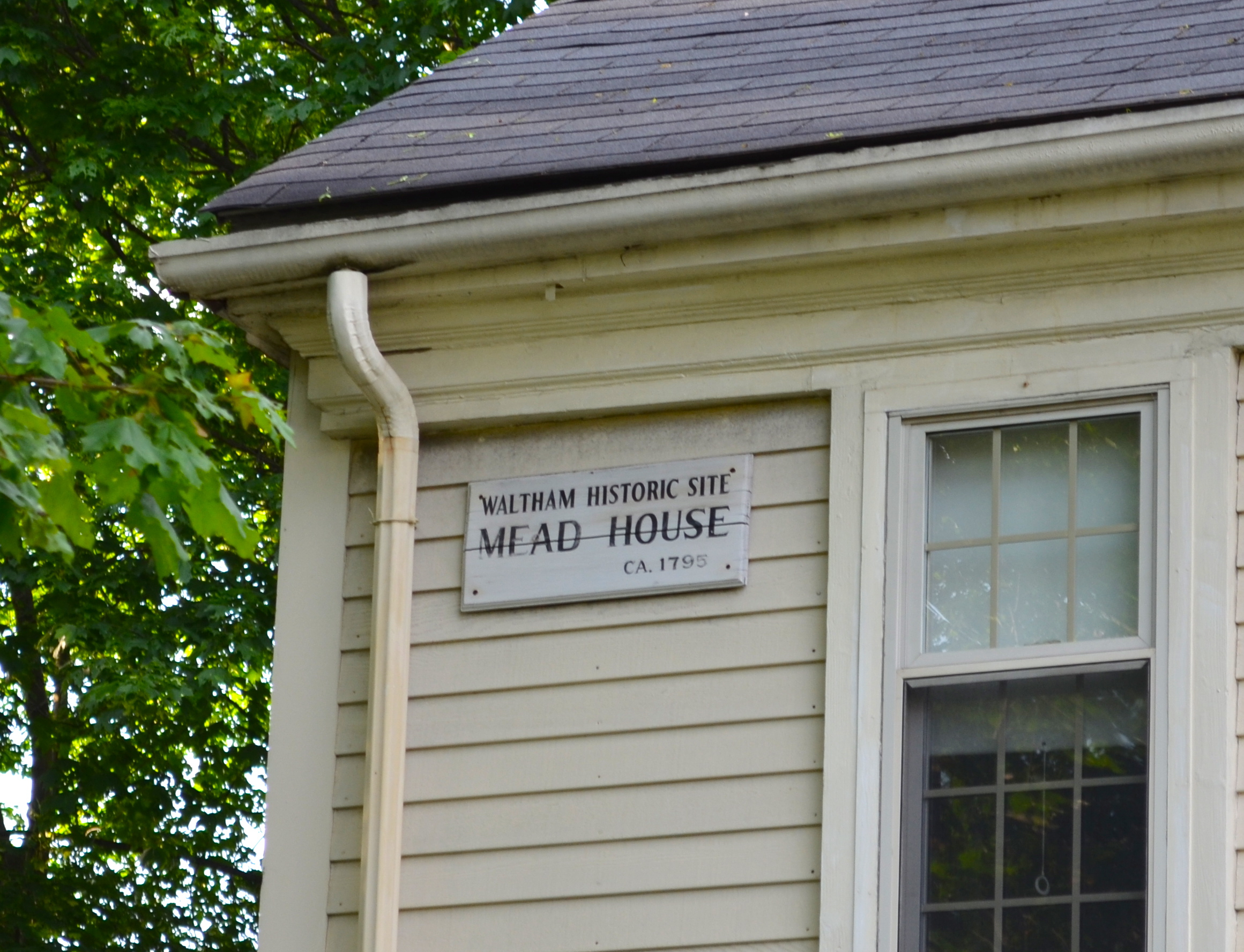
Plaque on the front of the house

== See also ==
- National Register of Historic Places listings in Waltham, Massachusetts
