= G. Kerndt & Brothers Office Block =

- U.S. National Register of Historic Places
- U.S. Historic district – Contributing property
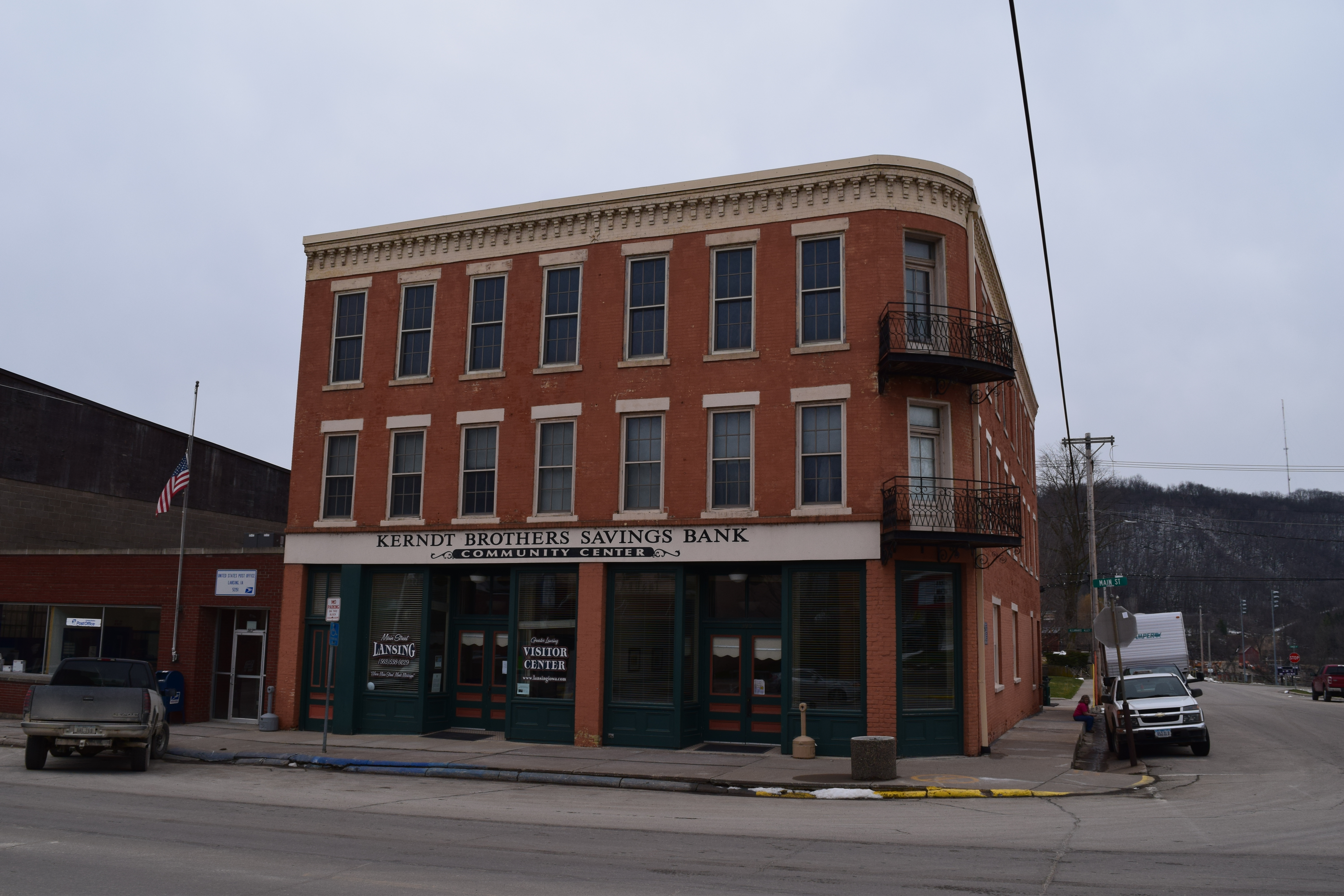

- Location within Iowa Location within the United States
- Location: 4th and Main Sts. Lansing, Iowa
- Coordinates: 43°21′42″N 91°13′07″W
- Area: Less than one acre
- Built: 1861, 1866
- Part of: Lansing Main Street Historic District (ID14000624)
- NRHP reference No.: 82000402
- Added to NRHP: November 10, 1982

G. Kerndt & Brothers Office Block, also known as the Kerndt Brothers Building, is a historic building located in Lansing, Iowa, United States. The four Kerndt brothers were all German immigrants who settled in the Lansing area by 1854. Gustav, William and Mortiz established a broom factory and cigar business in town while Herman farmed and provided the broom corn for the factory. In 1861 they built the first part of this building to house their general store. They were so successful they expanded the building in 1866. In addition to the store they also owned a gran elevator along the Mississippi River. Added to this they started in private banking as a part of their mercantile business. In 1908 it was incorporated by the family as the Kerndt Brothers Savings Bank. This building now houses the Kerndt Brothers Savings Bank Community Center.

The commercial Italianate building is a three-story brick structure. It features a simple cornice, a rounded corner, and two storefronts. The iron balconies on the second and third floors of the rounded corner are recreations of the originals. The building was listed on the National Register of Historic Places in 1982, and it was included as a contributing property in the Lansing Main Street Historic District in 2014.
