= Lansing Main Street Historic District =

Historic district in Iowa, United States

- U.S. National Register of Historic Places
- U.S. Historic district
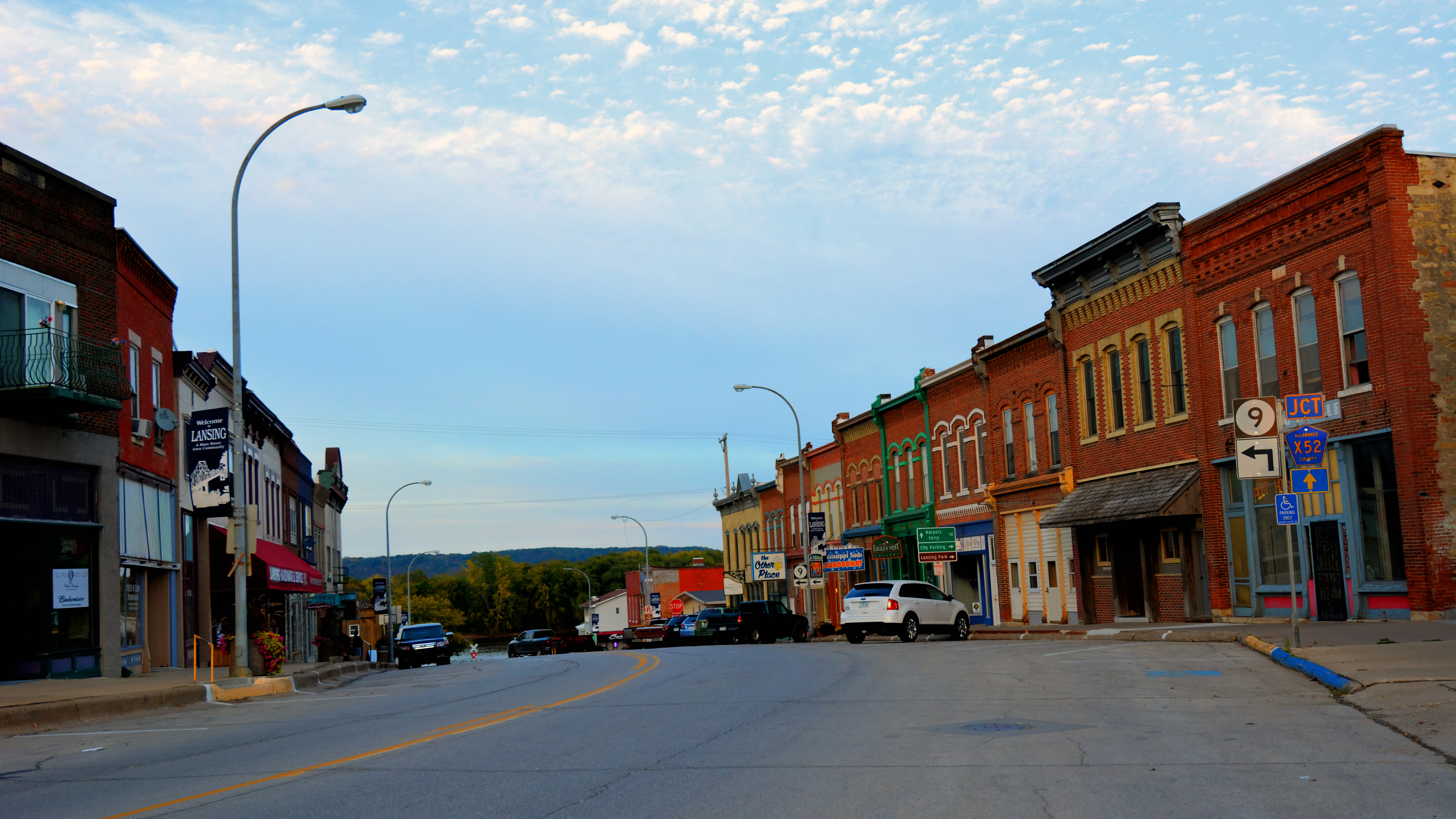

- Location within Iowa Location within the United States
- Location: 100–401 Main Street, 1 block north and south on Front and 2nd streets, and 190 John Street, Lansing, Iowa
- Coordinates: 43°21′42.7″N 91°12′58.8″W
- Area: 9.2 acres (3.7 ha)
- Architectural style: Italianate; Art Deco
- NRHP reference No.: 14000624
- Added to NRHP: September 17, 2014

The Lansing Main Street Historic District is a nationally recognized historic district located in Lansing, Iowa, United States. It was listed on the National Register of Historic Places in 2014. At the time of its nomination the district consisted of 51 resources, including 42 contributing buildings, 8 non-contributing buildings, and one non-contributing site. The district covers most of the central business district, which is generally along Main Street. The commercial buildings are mostly masonry structures constructed with bricks or native limestone. A few buildings are frame construction with gable roofs. The buildings are from one to three stories in height, although most are no taller that two stories. The Italianate architectural style dominates. Most of the upper stories in the buildings housed retail or office space, but a few were residential. The commercial buildings that did not house retail establishments were located near the Mississippi River and were industrial in nature. The G. Kerndt & Brothers Office Block (1861) and the G. Kerndt and Brothers Elevator and Warehouses, No. 11, No.12 and No. 13 (1868) are individually listed on the National Register. Three public buildings are located in the district: the former jail and fire station (ca. 1855–1865), the Art Deco former City Hall (1938), and the modern U.S. Post Office (c. 1960).
