= Monsrud Bridge =

- Formerly listed on the U.S. National Register of Historic Places
- Location within Iowa Location within the United States
- Location: Swebakken Rd. over Paint Creek
- Nearest city: Waterville, Iowa
- Coordinates: 43°13′08″N 91°19′36″W
- Built: 1887
- Built by: King Iron Bridge Co.
- Architectural style: Bowstring pony arch
- MPS: Highway Bridges of Iowa MPS
- NRHP reference No.: 98000771

Significant dates
- Added to NRHP: May 15, 1998
- Removed from NRHP: April 12, 2022

Monsrud Bridge is a historic structure originally located northwest of Waterville, Iowa, United States. It spanned Paint Creek for 43 feet (13 m). The King Iron Bridge Company of Cleveland fabricated and erected the Bowstring pony arch structure in 1887. It was listed on the National Register of Historic Places (NRHP) in 1998.

The bridge was replaced with a low water crossing and abandoned in place. In 2004, it was moved to the Yellow River State Forest. It was removed from the NRHP in 2022.
