= Broadway Avenue Bridge =

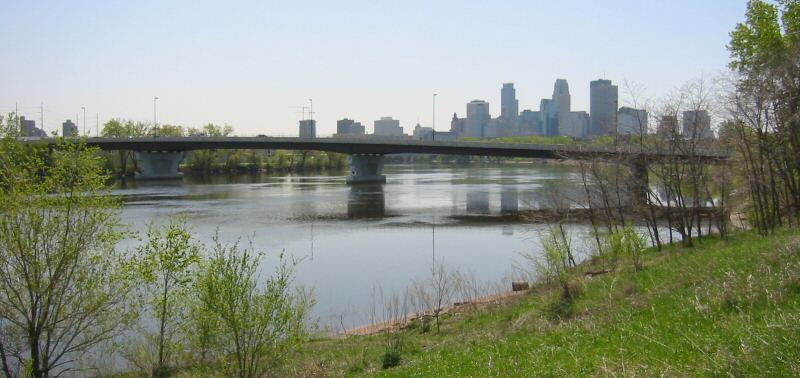
- Coordinates: 44°59′56″N 93°16′31″W
- Carries: Four lanes of West Broadway/Broadway Street Northeast
- Crosses: Mississippi River
- Locale: Minneapolis, Minnesota
- Official name: Broadway Avenue Bridge
- Maintained by: City of Minneapolis
- ID number: 27608

Characteristics
- Design: Girder bridge
- Total length: 857 feet (261 m)
- Width: 52 feet (16 m)
- Longest span: 186 feet (57 m)
- Clearance below: 22.6 feet (6.9 m)

History
- Opened: 1987

Broadway Avenue Bridge is a girder bridge that spans the Mississippi River in Minneapolis, Minnesota. Designed by Norman C. Davis and Shawn Pierson Bruns of Van Doren-Hazard-Stallings, it was built in 1987. The bridge has a rather streamlined shape, but its piers are more ornate. The piers have two flat columns that taper together, with a base that extends out to the full width of the bridge.

This bridge is the third bridge to cross the river at this location. The first bridge was a wooden structure completed in 1857, but washed away in a flood in 1859. The second bridge was a four-span Pratt truss bridge built in 1887. It spanned the northern industrial district that was developing on both sides of the river. The 1887 bridge was very ornate, featuring finials on each top corner and a band of scrolls, crosses, and lines between them. The horizontal struts and guard railings used X-shapes as a pattern. In 1950, the bridge was raised 20 feet (6.1 m) to allow barges and larger boats to pass underneath. The old bridge was removed in 1985, but a single span of the bridge lives on as the Merriam Street Bridge that connects Nicollet Island to the St. Anthony section of Minneapolis.

== See also ==
- List of bridges documented by the Historic American Engineering Record in Minnesota
- List of crossings of the Upper Mississippi River
