= Otto J. Hager House =

Historic house in Iowa, United States

- U.S. National Register of Historic Places
- The front of the house seen from the east

- Location within Iowa Location within the United States
- Location: 402 Allamakee St. Waukon, Iowa
- Coordinates: 43°16′23″N 91°28′33″W
- Area: Less than one acre
- Built: 1907-1908
- Architect: Robert Clossen Spencer, Jr.
- Architectural style: Prairie School
- NRHP reference No.: 85001383
- Added to NRHP: June 27, 1985

Otto J. Hager House is a historic building located in Waukon, Iowa, United States. Built from 1907 to 1908, the Hager house is the only known Iowa commission for Chicago architect Robert Clossen Spencer, Jr. Spencer played a leading role in the development of the Prairie School movement in the Midwest. His work was strongly influenced by the English Arts and Crafts movement, but with this house he moved away from that influence. It was designed in what was thought to be the most innovative period of his career.

The two-story, brick residence with a rubble stone foundation follows a rectangular plan. The main facade is asymmetrical. The open entry porch is off-center and features a superimposed chamfered balcony room. It is balanced by the stepped window stair set to the right. These two elements are vertically aligned with two hipped dormers on the roof. The entry is flanked by two free-standing flared columns with decorative capitals. They support an exposed wooden beam below the balcony room. Postville limestone contrasts with the red Monona brick, and was used for the water table, first floor window sills, terrace copings, a continuous projecting belt course, chimney copings, and a surround on the stair window set. The back of the house features a half-octagonal kitchen wing, which is in line with the main entrance. The house was listed on the National Register of Historic Places in 1985.
