= New Albin, Iowa =

- City
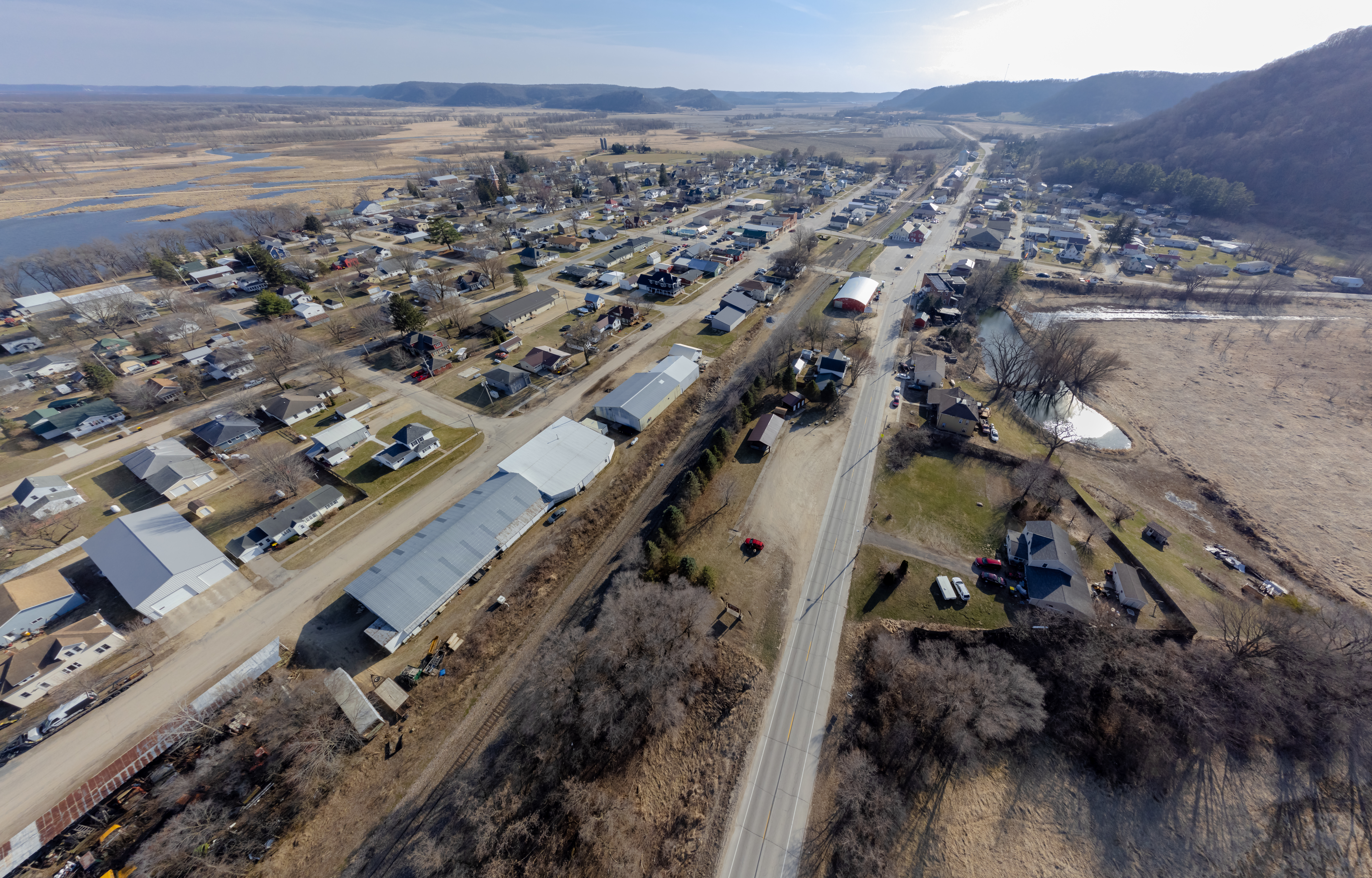
- Aerial view of New Albin

- Location of New Albin, Iowa

- Location within Iowa Location within the United States
- Coordinates: 43°29′55″N 91°17′15″W
- Country: United States
- State: Iowa
- County: Allamakee
- Township: Iowa
- Platted: 1872
- Incorporated: May 20, 1895
- Named for: Albin Rhomberg

Area
  - Total: 0.25 sq mi (0.65 km^{2})
  - Land: 0.25 sq mi (0.65 km^{2})
  - Water: 0 sq mi (0.00 km^{2})
- Elevation: 653 ft (199 m)

Population (2020)
  - Total: 432
  - Density: 1,712.2/sq mi (661.07/km^{2})
- Time zone: UTC-6 (Central (CST))
  - Summer (DST): UTC-5 (CDT)
- ZIP code: 52160
- Area code: 563
- FIPS code: 19-55785
- GNIS feature ID: 2395183

New Albin is a city in Iowa Township, Allamakee County, Iowa, United States. It is the northeastern-most town in Iowa, located on the Mississippi River and the Minnesota border. The population was 432 at the time of the 2020 census.

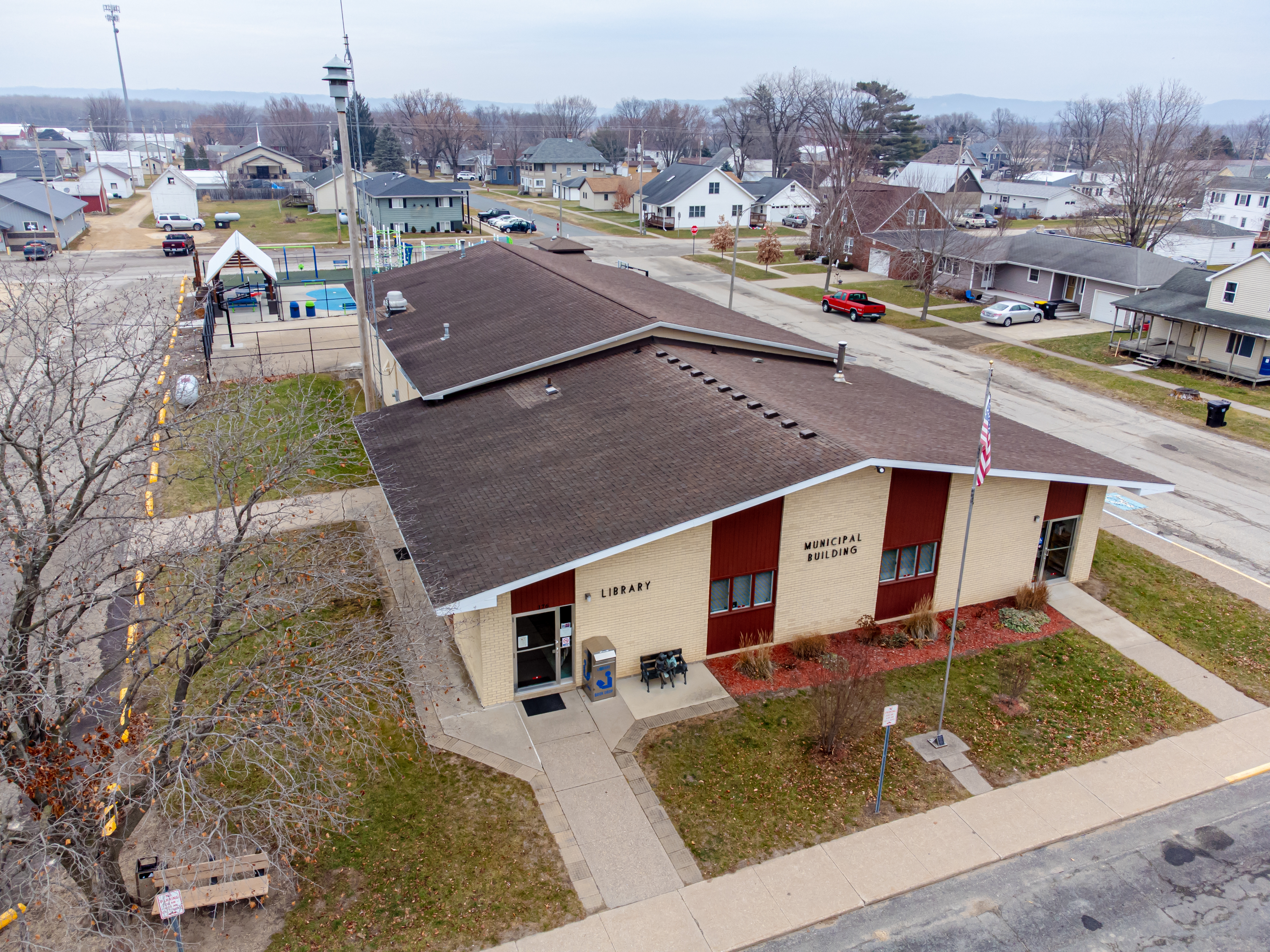
New Albin municipal building

== History ==
New Albin was platted in 1872 shortly after the Chicago, Dubuque and Minnesota Railroad had been built through that territory. It was named for the son of a railroad official, who died from burns after falling into a bonfire. Residents originally wanted to name the community 'Albin'; however, the post office claimed this would cause confusion with the already existing towns of Albia and Albion, so the name 'New Albion' was chosen instead.

On May 20, 1895, New Albion was officially incorporated as a city.

Highway 26 (originally Highway 182) was constructed through New Albin in 1936.

== Geography ==
According to the United States Census Bureau, the city has a total area of 0.24 square miles (0.62 km^{2}), all land.

In the north part of town, there is an iron post marking the border between Iowa and Minnesota.

== Demographics ==
Historical populations
Year	Pop.	±%
1880	423	—
1890	411	−2.8%
1900	543	+32.1%
1910	588	+8.3%
1920	683	+16.2%
1930	556	−18.6%
1940	602	+8.3%
1950	568	−5.6%
1960	643	+13.2%
1970	644	+0.2%
1980	609	−5.4%
1990	534	−12.3%
2000	527	−1.3%
2010	522	−0.9%
2020	432	−17.2%
Source:"U.S. Census website". United States Census Bureau. and Iowa Data Center; Source: U.S. Decennial Census

=== 2020 census ===
As of the census of 2020, there were 432 people, 206 households, and 114 families residing in the city. The population density was 1,712.2 inhabitants per square mile (661.1/km^{2}). There were 239 housing units at an average density of 947.2 per square mile (365.7/km^{2}). The racial makeup of the city was 97.2% White, 0.0% Black or African American, 0.5% Native American, 0.0% Asian, 0.0% Pacific Islander, 0.2% from other races and 2.1% from two or more races. Hispanic or Latino persons of any race comprised 0.5% of the population.

Of the 206 households, 21.8% of which had children under the age of 18 living with them, 41.3% were married couples living together, 10.7% were cohabitating couples, 23.3% had a female householder with no spouse or partner present and 24.8% had a male householder with no spouse or partner present. 44.7% of all households were non-families. 34.0% of all households were made up of individuals, 18.0% had someone living alone who was 65 years old or older.

The median age in the city was 45.6 years. 21.1% of the residents were under the age of 20; 5.3% were between the ages of 20 and 24; 22.9% were from 25 and 44; 26.6% were from 45 and 64; and 24.1% were 65 years of age or older. The gender makeup of the city was 51.9% male and 48.1% female.

=== 2010 census ===
As of the census of 2010, there were 522 people, 222 households, and 138 families living in the city. The population density was 2,175.0 inhabitants per square mile (839.8/km^{2}). There were 257 housing units at an average density of 1,070.8 per square mile (413.4/km^{2}). The racial makeup of the city was 97.1% White, 0.4% African American, 1.5% Native American, 0.4% Asian, 0.2% from other races, and 0.4% from two or more races. Hispanic or Latino of any race were 0.4% of the population.

There were 222 households, of which 27.9% had children under the age of 18 living with them, 50.5% were married couples living together, 7.7% had a female householder with no husband present, 4.1% had a male householder with no wife present, and 37.8% were non-families. 32.9% of all households were made up of individuals, and 17.6% had someone living alone who was 65 years of age or older. The average household size was 2.35 and the average family size was 3.01.

The median age in the city was 43.5 years. 25.3% of residents were under the age of 18; 5.6% were between the ages of 18 and 24; 21.1% were from 25 to 44; 25.7% were from 45 to 64; and 22.2% were 65 years of age or older. The gender makeup of the city was 49.6% male and 50.4% female.

=== 2000 census ===
As of the census of 2000, there were 527 people, 226 households, and 139 families living in the city. The population density was 2,390.8 inhabitants per square mile (923.1/km^{2}). There were 247 housing units at an average density of 1,120.5 per square mile (432.6/km^{2}). The racial makeup of the city was 97.15% White, 1.14% Native American, 0.19% from other races, and 1.52% from two or more races. Hispanic or Latino of any race were 0.57% of the population.

There were 226 households, out of which 29.2% had children under the age of 18 living with them, 50.0% were married couples living together, 8.0% had a female householder with no husband present, and 38.1% were non-families. 34.1% of all households were made up of individuals, and 15.9% had someone living alone who was 65 years of age or older. The average household size was 2.33 and the average family size was 2.99.

Age spread: 26.9% under the age of 18, 7.6% from 18 to 24, 25.8% from 25 to 44, 19.4% from 45 to 64, and 20.3% who were 65 years of age or older. The median age was 38 years. For every 100 females, there were 95.2 males. For every 100 females age 18 and over, there were 96.4 males.

The median income for a household in the city was $32,981, and the median income for a family was $36,667. Males had a median income of $26,625 versus $19,375 for females. The per capita income for the city was $14,049. About 4.5% of families and 6.6% of the population were below the poverty line, including 6.3% of those under age 18 and 8.5% of those age 65 or over.

== Transportation ==
Passenger train service was provided to New Albin throughout its early history. Trains ran from La Crosse along the west bank of the Mississippi River through New Albin to Dubuque. This service gradually decreased in the first half of the twentieth century and was discontinued on June 8, 1951.

== Notable person ==
- Milt Gantenbein, NFL player for the Green Bay Packers, was born in New Albin
