= Yellow River State Forest =

State forest in Iowa, United States

- Location within Iowa Location within the United States
- Location: Allamakee County, Iowa
- Coordinates: 43°9′18″N 91°14′36″W
- Area: 8,900 acres (3,600 ha)
- Established: 1935
- Administrator: Iowa Department of Natural Resources
- Website: Official website
- Yellow River State Forest Fire Tower
- U.S. National Register of Historic Places
- Area: Less than one acre
- Built: 1962
- Built by: Bob Menery
- NRHP reference No.: 100006909
- Added to NRHP: September 14, 2021

Yellow River State Forest (YRSF) is mostly forested land owned by the Iowa Department of Natural Resources. It is located in the southeastern corner of Allamakee County, the most northeasterly of Iowa's counties. It is adjacent to the Upper Mississippi River National Wildlife and Fish Refuge and is just north of Effigy Mounds National Monument in the bluff region of the Upper Mississippi River.

== History ==
The forest was established in 1933 by the Civilian Conservation Corps with the purchase of 1500 acres of land at the mouth of the Yellow River. It now has six units: Luster Heights, Paint Creek North, Paint Creek South, Paint Rock, Waukon Junction and Yellow River, collectively aggregating 8,503 acres (3,441 ha). The original 1,500 acres (610 ha) were transferred to the National Park Service in 1945, due to the presence of many Native American effigy mounds, and is now known as Effigy Mounds National Monument. The majority of YRSF is now in the catchment of Paint Creek. Some of the forest is reclaimed farmland, but much of it was never farmed because of the steepness of the terrain.

The State and the various Federal agencies actively cooperate in the management of the lands under their care, particularly in the use of fire to maintain goat prairies, which are found "on steep, thin soils with a south-southwest exposure. The best examples occur in northeast Iowa's Paleozoic Plateau, but similar prairie can be found in other parts of the state."

== Geological history ==
The forest is located in the Driftless Area of Iowa, a region that was not glaciated during the last ice age. The geology of the region shows ancient Silurian period formations. The Yellow River and Paint Creek have rugged, steep walled canyons, showing millennia of erosion, where glacial action would have otherwise smoothed out the features.

== Lumber production ==
Yellow River is home to one of only two public-owned sawmills in Iowa, with the other at Shimek State Forest. The first sawmill in Iowa, which was built in the 1800s, was also located in Yellow River. About 150,000 board feet (350 m³) of lumber is annually harvested in the forest and processed by inmates at the minimum-security Luster Heights Prison Farm. The prisoners do other work in the forest as well. The lumber produced at the sawmill is used for state-related projects and can be produced for private orders. The type of wood produced at the sawmill depends on the type of wood that grows in the forest (mainly oak and hickory).

== Yellow River Fire Tower ==
The forest includes the Yellow River Fire Tower, the only fire tower standing in Iowa. The tower is an Aermotor LS40 model fire tower sold to the Iowa Department of Natural Resources from the U.S. Forest Service. It was acquired in 1950 and rebuilt on the current site in 1962. Today it is in poor condition, most of the window sashes have been broken out, all the window glass is gone, some of the cab roofing is gone, and the wood on the stairs and in the cab has rotted away, most of this is due to vandalism. So for that and safety reasons, the tower was fenced in and is currently closed to the public. It was listed on the National Register of Historic Places in 2021.

=== Tower measurements ===
- Tower height- 100 feet
- Cab- 7x7 feet
- Elevation- 1047 feet

== See also ==
- Monsrud Bridge

== Sources ==
- Yellow River State Forest Iowa Department of Natural Resources
- Iowa Audubon Society
- Paint Creek, Army Corps of Engineers
- Yellow River Fire Tower National Historic Lookout Register
