= List of dams and reservoirs in Wisconsin =

Map of large dams in Wisconsin. There are 175 Hydroelectric dams in Wisconsin according the Wisconsin DNR.

Hydroelectric dams

Large dams with no hydroelectricity

Following is a list of dams and reservoirs in Wisconsin.

All major dams are linked below. The National Inventory of Dams defines any "major dam" as being 50 feet (15 m) tall with a storage capacity of at least 5,000 acre-feet (6,200,000 m^{3}), or of any height with a storage capacity of 25,000 acre-feet (31,000,000 m^{3}).

== Dams and reservoirs in Wisconsin ==
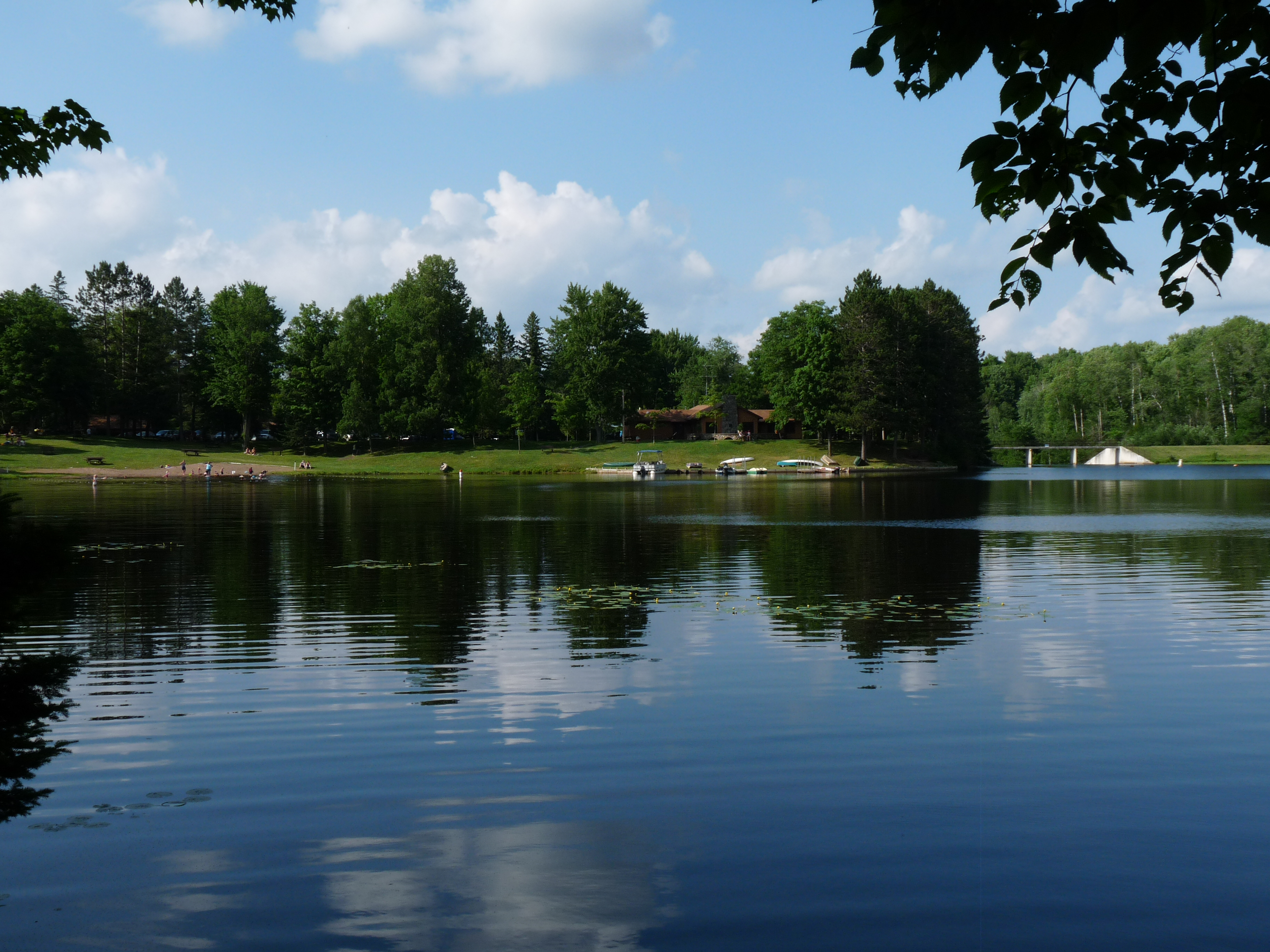
Mondeaux Dam Recreation Area

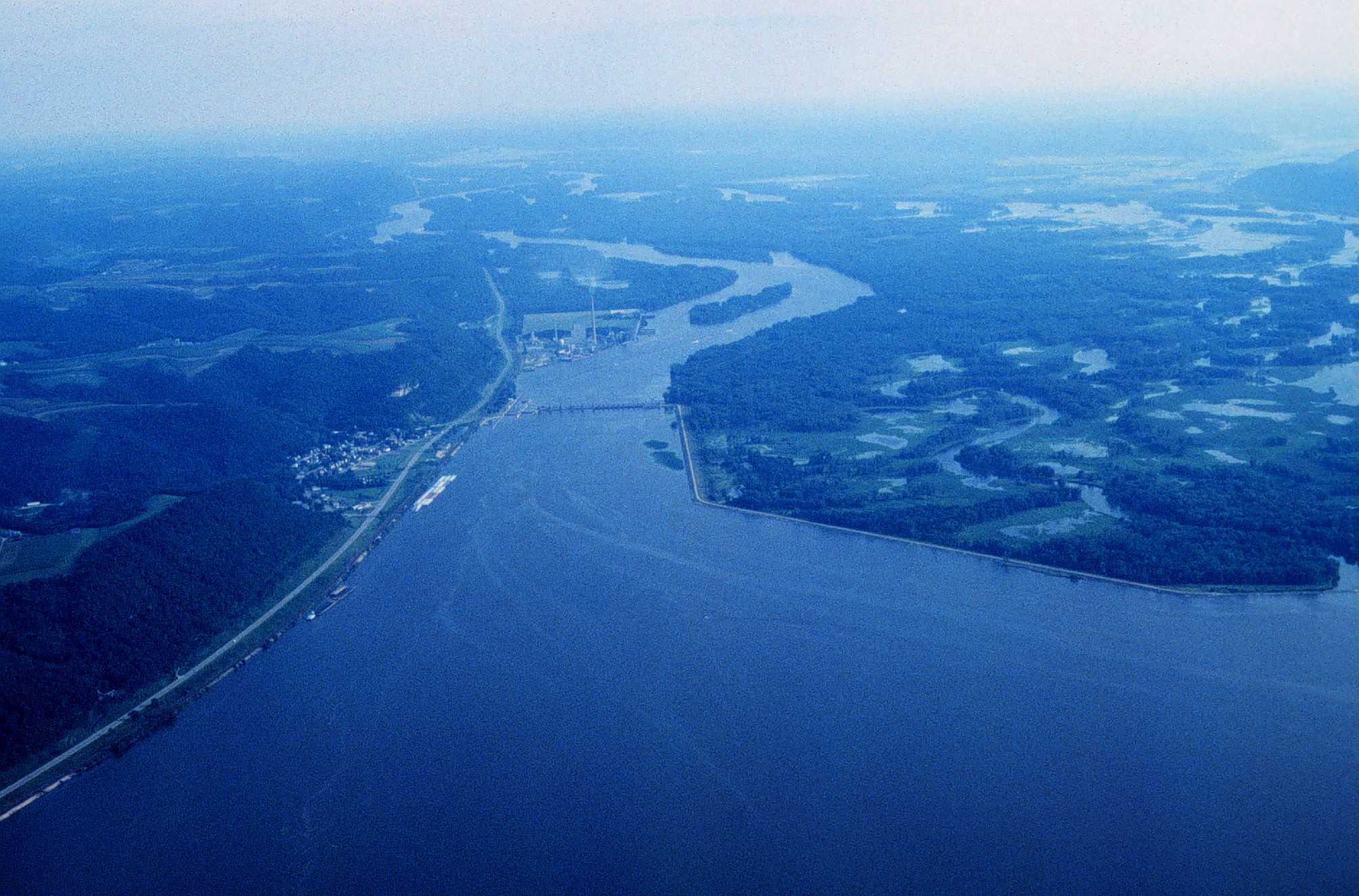
aerial view of Lock and Dam No. 8

This list is incomplete. You can help Wikipedia by expanding it.

- Lock and Dam No. 3, Mississippi River, United States Army Corps of Engineers (between Wisconsin and Minnesota)
- Lock and Dam No. 4, Mississippi River, USACE (between Wisconsin and Minnesota)
- Lock and Dam No. 5, Mississippi River, USACE (between Wisconsin and Minnesota)
- Lock and Dam No. 5A, Mississippi River, USACE (between Wisconsin and Minnesota)
- Lock and Dam No. 6, Mississippi River, USACE (between Wisconsin and Minnesota)
- Lock and Dam No. 7, Lake Onalaska, USACE (between Wisconsin and Minnesota)
- Lock and Dam No. 8, Mississippi River, USACE (between Wisconsin and Minnesota)
- Lock and Dam No. 9, Lake Winneshiek, USACE (between Wisconsin and Iowa)
- Lock and Dam No. 11, Mississippi River, USACE (between Wisconsin and Iowa)
- Alexander Dam, Alexander Lake, Wisconsin Public Service Corp.
- Altoona 2WP340 Dam, Lake Altoona, Eau Claire County
- Arpin Dam, Radisson Flowage on the Chippewa River, Renewable World Energy, LLC
- Babcock Park Lock and Dam, Lake Waubesa, Dane County
- Big Eau Pleine Dam, Big Eau Pleine Reservoir, Wisconsin Valley Improvement Company
- Billy Boy Flowage Dam, 45.84195, -91.40758
- Biron Dam, Biron Flowage, NewPage
- Caldron Falls Dam, Caldron Falls Reservoir, Wisconsin Public Service Co.
- Castle Rock Dam, Castle Rock Lake, Wisconsin River Power Company
- Cedar Falls Dam, Tainter Lake, Xcel Energy
- Chalk Hills Dam, unnamed reservoir on the Menominee River, Wisconsin Electric Power Co. (between Wisconsin and Michigan)
- Chequamegon Waters Dam, 45.20061, -90.71103
- Chippewa Lake Dam, 45.88809, -91.07708
- Chippewa Falls Dam, unnamed reservoir on the Chippewa River, Xcel Energy
- Cornell Dam, Cornell Flowage, Xcel Energy
- Chute Pond Dam, Chute Pond, Oconto County
- Crowley Flowage Dam, 45.86852, -90.58542
- Dell Creek Dam, Lake Delton, Village of Lake Delton
- Dexterville Dam, Lake Dexter, Wood County
- DuBay Dam, Lake DuBay, NewPage
- Eau Claire Dam, Eau Claire Lake, Eau Claire County
- Flambeau Flowage Dam, 46.06977, -90.22393
- High Falls Dam, High Falls Reservoir, Wisconsin Public Service Co.
- Holcombe Dam, Holcombe Flowage, Xcel Energy
- Gordon Dam, St. Croix Flowage on the St. Croix River, Douglas County
- Grandfather Dam, unnamed reservoir on the Wisconsin River, Wisconsin Public Service Co.
- Indianford Dam, Lake Koshkonong, Rock County
- Jim Falls Dam, Old Abe Lake, upper overflow dam, 45.06044, -91.2663
- Jim Falls Dam, Old Abe Lake on the Chippewa River, lower hydroelectric dam, Xcel Energy, 45.05137, -91.27417
- Kilbourn Dam, Dells of the Wisconsin River, Alliant Energy
- La Farge Dam (uncompleted), Kickapoo River, USACE
- Long Lake Dam (by Nobleton), 45.66708, -91.68125
- Long Lake / Jobes Dam (by Phillips), 45.68291, -90.45232
- Lake of the Falls Dam, 46.15056, -90.16127
- Lower Park Falls Dam, 45.91348, -90.44763
- Menasha Genlaws, a portion of Little Lake Butte des Morts, USACE
- Menomonie Dam, Lake Menomin, Xcel Energy
- Mondeaux Dam, Mondeaux Flowage, Chequamegon-Nicolet National Forest
- Mooney Dam, 46.25876, -91.56958 / Lower Eau Claire Lake
- Namekagon Dam, 46.22372, -91.148
- Neenah Dam, a portion of Little Lake Butte des Morts, Neenah and Menasha Power Co.
- Lake Noquebay Dam, Lake Noquebay, Marinette County
- Park Falls Dam, 45.93838, -90.44407
- Petenwell Dam, Petenwell Lake, Wisconsin River Power Company
- Prairie du Sac Dam, Lake Wisconsin, Alliant Energy
- Radisson Flowage Dam, 45.76093, -91.2025
- Rainbow Dam, Rainbow Flowage, Wisconsin Valley Improvement Company
- Rapide Croche Lock and Dam, unnamed reservoir on the Fox River, USACE
- Red Cedar / Hemlock Lake Dam, 45.58977, -91.60194
- Lake Redstone Dam, Lake Redstone, Sauk County
- Rice Lake Dam, 45.49928, -91.73291
- Round Lake Logging Dam, South Fork of the Flambeau River, Price County
- St. Croix Falls Dam, Indianhead Flowage on the St. Croix River (Wisconsin–Minnesota), Xcel Energy
- Sandstone Rapids Dam, Sandstone Reservoir, Wisconsin Public Service Co.
- Stone Lake Dam, 45.83244, -91.56426
- Sturgeon Falls Dam, unnamed reservoir on the Menominee River, City of Norway, Michigan (between Wisconsin and Michigan)
- Tomahawk Dam, Lake Mohawksin on the Wisconsin River, Wisconsin Public Service Co.
- Trego Dam, Trego Lake on the Namekagon River, Xcel Energy
- Turtle Dam, Turtle-Flambeau Flowage on the North Fork of the Flambeau River, Xcel Energy
- Upper Beaver Dam, Beaver Dam Lake (Wisconsin), City of Beaver Dam
- Upper Green Lake Dam, Upper Green Lake, City of Green Lake
- White Rapids Dam, Rosebush Lake on the Menominee River, Wisconsin Electric Power Co. (between Wisconsin and Michigan)
- Winter Dam, Lake Chippewa (Wisconsin) on the Chippewa River, Xcel Energy
- Winter Lake Dam (by Winter), 45.79591, -90.98879 (not the same as previous line)
- Wissota Dam, Lake Wissota, Xcel Energy

== See also ==
- List of lakes of Wisconsin
- List of hydroelectric dams in Wisconsin
