= Wisconsin's 72nd Assembly district =

American legislative district in central Wisconsin

Wisconsin's 72nd State Assembly district
- 2024 map defined in 2023 Wisc. Act 94; 2022 map defined in Johnson v. Wisconsin Elections Commission; 2011 map was defined in 2011 Wisc. Act 43
Assemblymember
Scott Krug; R–Rome
since January 3, 2011 (15 years)
- Demographics: 92.46% White; 0.97% Black; 2.47% Hispanic; 1.5% Asian; 1.98% Native American; 0.09% Hawaiian/Pacific Islander
- Population (2020) • Voting age: 59,742; 48,081
- Website: Official website
- Notes: Central Wisconsin

The 72nd Assembly district of Wisconsin is one of 99 districts in the Wisconsin State Assembly. Located in central Wisconsin, the district comprises the northern half of Juneau County, the southern half of Wood County, and much of the northern half of Adams County. It includes the cities of Wisconsin Rapids, Adams, and Nekoosa, and the villages of Biron, Camp Douglas, Friendship, Necedah, and Port Edwards. The district also contains Volk Field Air National Guard Base, Buckhorn State Park, Roche-a-Cri State Park, most of Necedah National Wildlife Refuge, and the eastern half of Mill Bluff State Park. The district is represented by Republican Scott Krug, since January 2011.

The 72nd Assembly district is located within Wisconsin's 24th Senate district, along with the 70th and 71st Assembly districts.

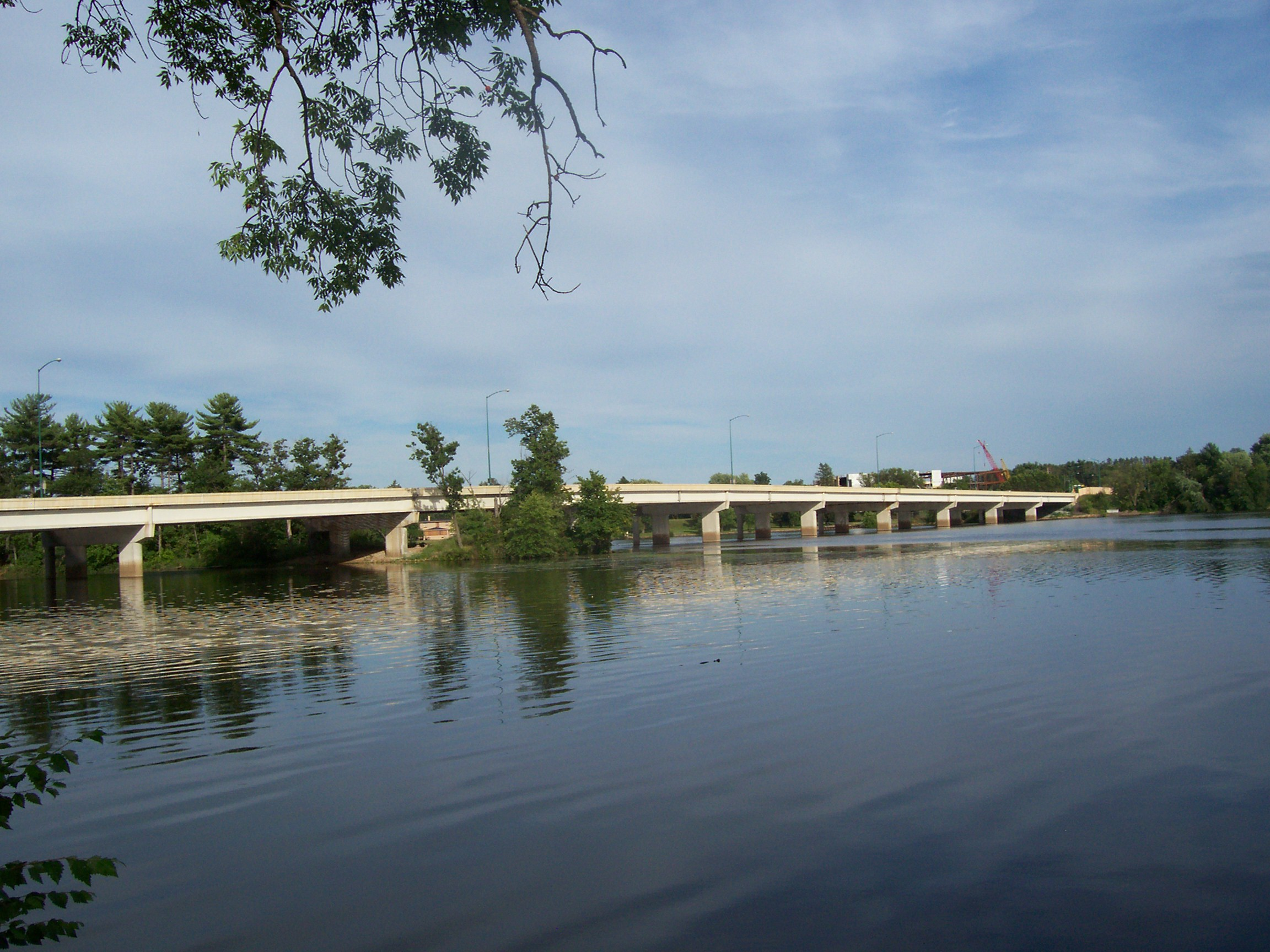
Bridge over the Wisconsin River at Wisconsin Rapids

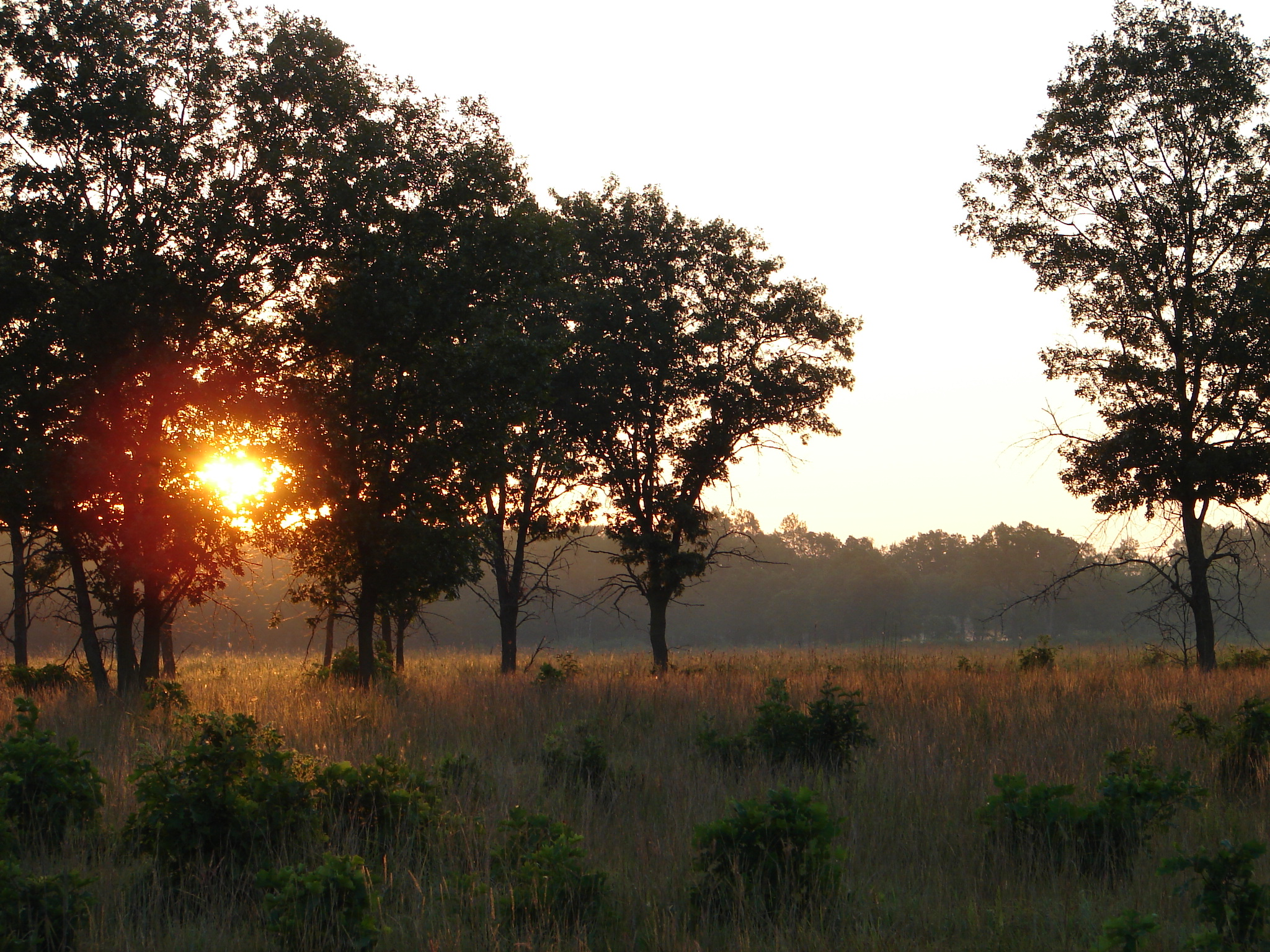
Necedah National Wildlife Refuge

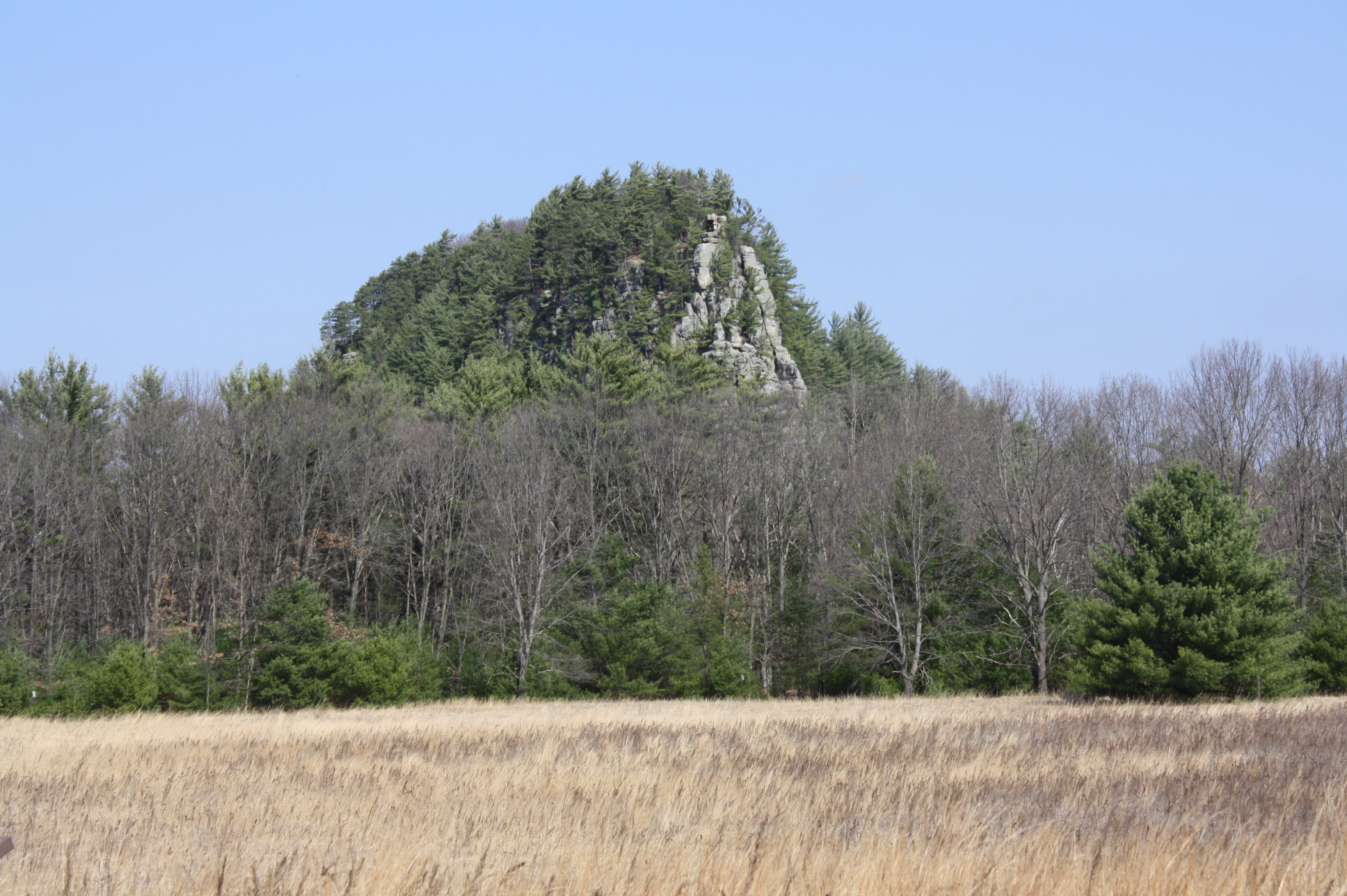
Roche-a-Cri State Park

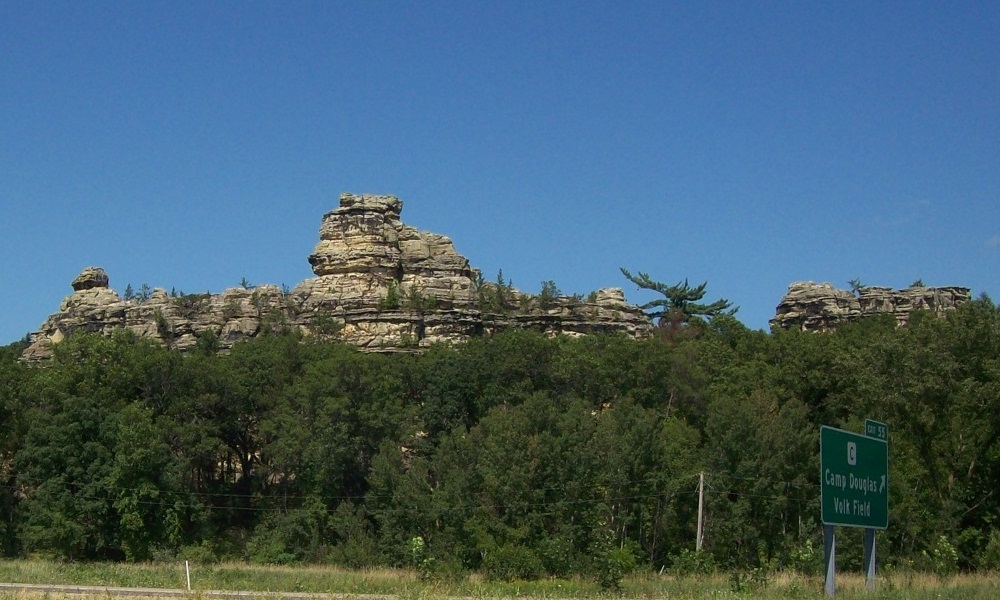
Castle Rock near Camp Douglas

== List of past representatives ==
List of representatives to the Wisconsin State Assembly from the 72nd district
Member	Party	Residence	Counties represented	Term start	Term end	Ref.
District created
Jon P. Wilcox	Rep.	Wautoma	Dodge, Fond du Lac, Green Lake, Waushara	January 1, 1973	January 6, 1975	
Patricia A. Goodrich	Rep.	Berlin	Dodge, Fond du Lac, Green Lake, Waushara	January 6, 1975	January 3, 1983	
Mary Panzer	Rep.	West Bend	Ozaukee, Washington	January 3, 1983	January 7, 1985	
Marlin D. Schneider	Dem.	Wisconsin Rapids	Adams, Marquette, Portage	January 7, 1985	January 3, 2011	
Marlin D. Schneider	Dem.	Wisconsin Rapids	Adams, Marquette, Portage, Waushara	January 7, 1985	January 3, 2011	
Scott Krug	Rep.	Rome	Adams, Portage, Waushara, Wood	January 3, 2011	Current	
Scott Krug	Rep.	Rome	Adams, Juneau, Wood	January 3, 2011	Current	
