= List of Wisconsin hurricanes =

Wisconsin, located well inland in North America, is infrequently affected by the remnants of tropical cyclones impacting in the Southern United States. It has never been directly impacted by the full effects of a hurricane. Since 1851, when reliable records for the North Atlantic hurricane basin began, no cyclones have traversed the state while retaining tropical characteristics. Only three of these storms have tracked directly across the state. Under normal circumstances, mid-latitude westerlies push remnant cyclones from the North Atlantic and the Gulf of Mexico northeast or east and away from the Midwestern United States. In some cases, an area of high pressure over the Central United States can cause storms to travel farther north than normal. Hurricane Carla in 1961 produced the greatest rainfall of any of these storms with 7.58 in (193 mm) falling in Brodhead.

== List of storms ==
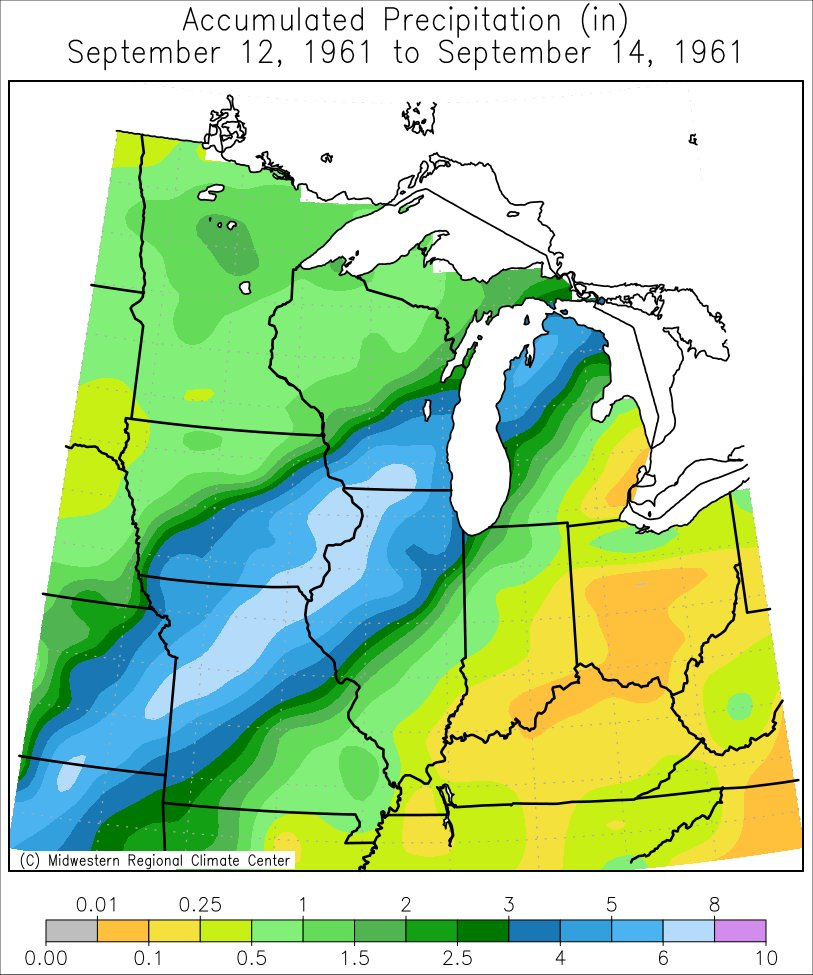
A map of rainfall accumulations associated with the remnants of Hurricane Carla in mid-September 1961 across the Upper Mississippi River Valley.

=== 1900s ===
- September 10–11, 1900 — The extratropical remnants of the 1900 Galveston hurricane quickly traverse the state before entering Lake Michigan at Milwaukee. Rainfall amounts peak at 4.25 in (108 mm) in Shawano, with 27 of 39 weather stations in northern and central Wisconsin registering over 1 in (25 mm) of rain in 24 hours. The National Weather Service lists it as the first recorded center of a tropical storm to cross through Wisconsin.
- June 14, 1906 — The remnants of a tropical storm produce light rain across southeastern parts of the state; accumulations reach 0.4–0.5 in (10–13 mm).
- October 19–20, 1916 — The remnants of a hurricane produce rainfall across the state, reaching 1.5–2 in (38–51 mm) in southeastern counties.
- June 26, 1921 — It brought less than 0.75 inches (1.9 cm) to the entire state.
- October 17-18-19, 1923 — It dropped over 2 inches (5.1 cm) precipitation to southeastern Wisconsin.
- September 24–25, 1941 — the entire state received precipation with the southeast corner of the state recording up to 1.5 inches (3.8 cm)
- October 1949 Texas hurricane — Extratropical remnants of the Category 2 hurricane traversed the state. The National Weather Service lists it as the second recorded center of a tropical storm to cross through Wisconsin.
- 1960 Texas tropical storm — Peak rainfall of 2.83 in (72 mm) at the Eau Pleine Reservoir.
- September 12–14, 1961 — The extratropical remnants of Hurricane Carla bring 54 hours of rainfall to much of the Upper Midwest, with the heaviest rains occurring along a swath from Missouri to Wisconsin. Accumulations peak at 7.58 in (193 mm) in Brodhead, the highest on record for the state from a tropical cyclone's remnants. This equated to the average rainfall for September, October, and November combined. Overall effects were relatively limited and farmers welcomed the precipitation due to an ongoing drought. Brodhead recorded 4.48 in (114 mm) of rain in a 24-hour period, a record for the month of September. Some creeks and rivers overtopped their banks, leading to flooding on highways. Slippery roads led to a car hydroplaning into an embankment, injuring the two occupants.
- June 26, 1968 — Rains from Tropical Storm Candy fall across much of Wisconsin as the center of the storm passes south of the state, with a rainfall maximum of 5.75 in (146 mm) in Charmany Farm. The Wisconsin Michigan Power Company's weather station in Appleton, Wisconsin sets a single-day rainfall record with 3.92 in (100 mm) falling on June 26. The heavy rains elevate streams in the Fox Cities, prompting the opening of locks along the Fox River to mitigate a possible failure of the Little Kaukauna Dam and flooding along Lake Winnebago. The rains flood most basements in central Appleton. Milwaukee also reports the flooding of 400 basements. High winds down power lines, causing power outages in several towns including Caroline, Marion, and Menasha.
- August 21, 1983 – The remnants of Hurricane Alicia combine with a warm front to produce widespread rainfall over northeastern Wisconsin. Rainfall accumulations peak at 2.32 in (59 mm) at Green Bay International Airport. Winds associated with Alicia's remnants top out at 38 mph (61 km/h) at Mitchell Field in Milwaukee. In Kenosha, the winds down trees and power lines, cutting power to some 300 homes.
- Hurricane Juan 1985 — Peak rainfall of 4.9 in (120 mm) in Marinette.

The remnants of Hurricane Chantal impacting southeastern Wisconsin on August 4, 1989

- September 24–26, 1986 — The remnants of Eastern Pacific Hurricane Newton bring heavy rain to southern portions of the state, exacerbating ongoing flooding. Accumulations peak at 3.3 in (84 mm) in Beloit. Kenosha County sees extensive damage, with more than 200 homes and 3 businesses flooded; property damage exceeded $6 million. A severe thunderstorm and accompanying downburst inflicts $900,000 in damage across Sheboygan; widespread damage to homes and trees occurs and about a quarter of the city's roads become impassable. Thirty-minute rainfall accumulations reach 2.36 in (60 mm) in the city. Two brief tornadoes also cause minor damage elsewhere in the state.
- September 20–21, 1988 — The extratropical remnants of Hurricane Gilbert cross southeastern Wisconsin, becoming the third system to track directly across the state. Rainfall accompanying the storm does not exceed 1 in (25 mm).
- August 4, 1989 — Following the dissipation of Hurricane Chantal's surface circulation, its remnant cloud shield and associated shortwave trough tracked across southern Wisconsin, producing significant precipitation. Rainfall accumulations peaked at 3.67 in (93 mm) in Port Washington. Severe thunderstorms produce damaging winds of 75 mph (121 km/h) and hail up to 2.25 in (5.7 cm) in diameter, toppling trees and power poles. The Wisconsin State Journal describes tree damage as the worst in several years for the state. Extensive crop damage occurred and barns were flattened around La Crosse. One person was injured when a wall collapsed in Janesville.
- September 25–27, 1992 — Dual rain events from the remnants of Pacific Hurricane Lester affect the entire state for three days. Accumulations peak at 2.83 in (72 mm) near Blue Mounds.
- September 14–15, 1998 — Light to moderate rain accompanies the extratropical remnant of Tropical Storm Frances; accumulations peak at 3.75 in (95 mm) in Darlington.

=== 2000s ===
- July 16–17, 2005 — The slow-moving remnants of Hurricane Dennis bring very light rain to parts Wisconsin, with a maximum of 0.6 in (15 mm) registered in Phelps. The rainfall does little to alleviate severe drought conditions plaguing the state.
- September 4–5, 2008 — Described as a rare event for southeastern Wisconsin, heavy rains accompany the passage of former Hurricane Gustav. Accumulations reach 3.14 in (80 mm) in Kenosha, with nearby areas reporting 1–2 in (25–51 mm). Localized ponding affects roads and low-lying areas.
- September 15, 2008 — Light rainfall occurs in far southeastern parts of the state with the passage of former Hurricane Ike. Accumulations reach 1.43 in (36 mm) in Kenosha.
- September 2–3, 2012 — The remnants of Hurricane Isaac bring negligible rainfall to extreme southeastern Wisconsin, failing to alleviate drought conditions.

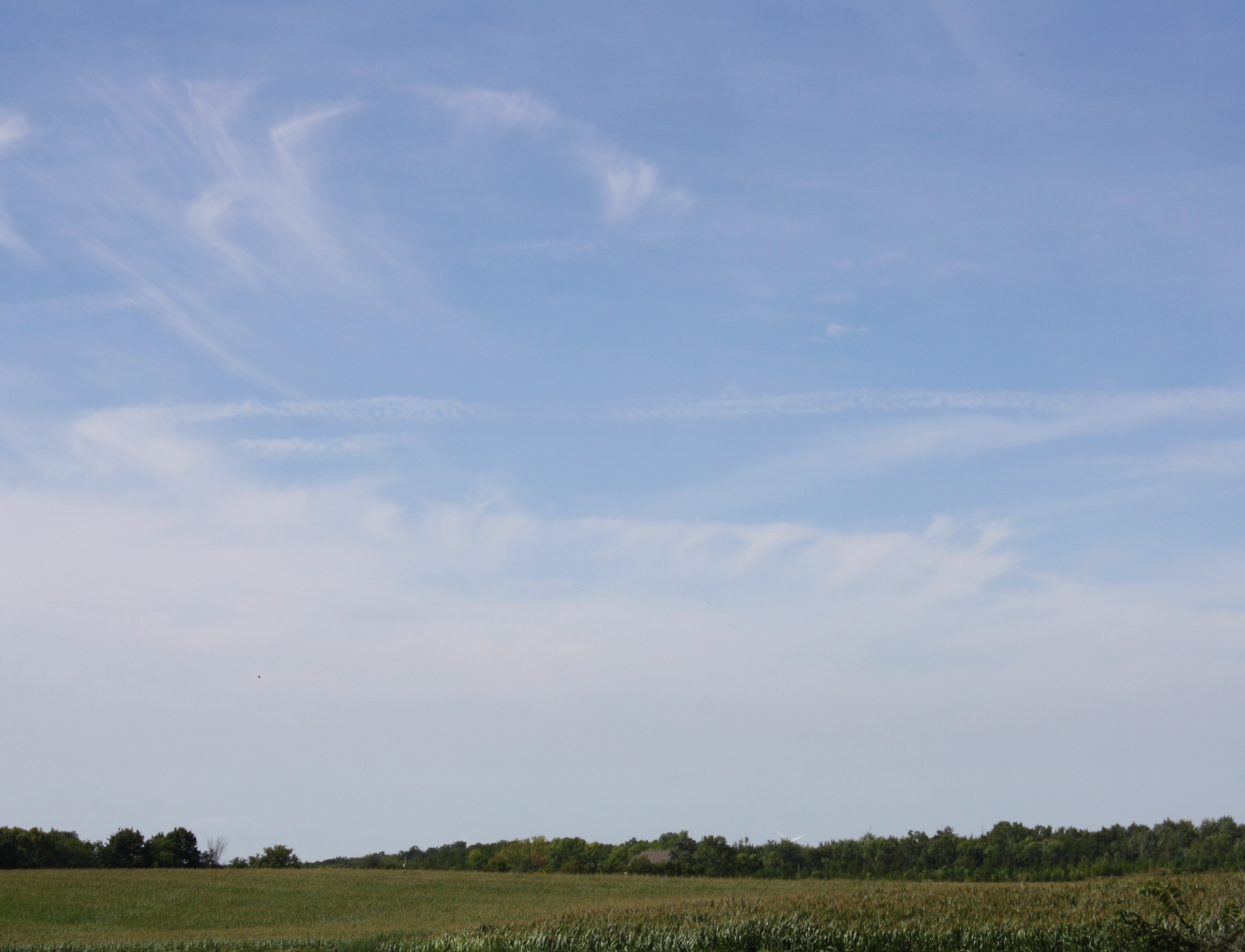
Clouds from Hurricane Isaac (2012) in eastern Wisconsin

- October 30–31, 2012 — A tight pressure gradient between the remnants of Hurricane Sandy to the east and an area of high pressure to the west produce gusty winds across Lake Michigan and the adjoining coastlines from Sheboygan to Kenosha counties. Sustained winds primarily reach 25–30 mph (40–48 km/h), with a peak of 48 mph (77 km/h) just offshore. Onshore, gusts reach 55 mph (89 km/h) in Sister Bay. Waves of 8–10 ft (2.4–3.0 m) cause minor beach erosion along the coast of Kenosha County. Property damage associated with the event totals $8,000. A cold airmass behind the cyclone results in temperatures falling to 14 °F (−10 °C) in Hayward and reports of light snow in Land O' Lakes.
- May 30–31, 2018 — Progressing unusually far inland as a tropical cyclone, light rainfall accompanies the passage of Tropical Depression Alberto to the east.
- October 26–27, 2019 — The fast-moving extratropical remnant of Tropical Storm Olga brings light rainfall to southeastern Wisconsin as it traverses Lake Michigan. Accumulations reach 2.04 in (52 mm) near Kenosha.
- June 9–10, 2020 — The remnants of Tropical Storm Cristobal traverse the state just after transitioning into an extratropical cyclone. Operationally, it was believed to have entered the state while still a tropical cyclone. It was the most northwestern track of a tropical storm in recorded history. Widespread rainfall affects the region, with the heaviest amounts concentrated in west-central portions of the state. Madison recorded a pressure of 988 mbar (hPa; 29.20 inHg) and wind gusts peak at 51 mph (82 km/h) at the Fond du Lac County Airport, both records for the month of June. Rainfall reaches 3.33 in (85 mm) near Augusta. Isolated flash flooding submerges some roads.
- July 9, 2024 - The remnants of Hurricane Beryl bring rainfall in Southeastern Wisconsin.
