= Biron Flowage =

Coordinates: 44°27′03″N 89°42′48″W

- Interactive map of Biron Flowage
- Location: Wood County, Portage County
- Type: Reservoir
- Part of: Wisconsin River
- Primary inflows: Wisconsin River
- Primary outflows: Wisconsin River
- Catchment area: ~6.35 billion US gallons (2.40×10^{10} L; 5.29×10^{9} imp gal)
- Managing agency: Biron Hydroelectric Co.
- Built: 1916
- Surface area: 2,187 acres (885 ha)
- Settlements: Biron, Wisconsin

Biron Flowage is a 2,187-acre (885 ha) reservoir on the Wisconsin River spanning Wood County and Portage County in central Wisconsin. The modern dam (Biron Dam) was created by the Biron Hydroelectric Company in 1916, it has a maximum depth of 23 ft (7.0 m) and features a sand-gravel-muck substrate, providing a habitat to a number of species of wildlife. The area that includes the reservoir and surrounding wetlands was an ancestral heartland for the Ho-Chunk (Winnebago) people, and was first documented by the French in the early 17th century.

== History ==
The area around the reservoir was inhabited by the Ho-Chunk for thousands of years before European settlement. They utilized the nearby Wisconsin and Fox Rivers for trade, and the Biron Flowage reach includes what used to be prosperous hunting grounds for the natives. French documents from 1616 note the Ho-Chunk settlement in the area of the Flowage. During the early 19th century, regional land cessions opened much of the Wisconsin River to logging and trapping. Settlement of the area followed the Treaty of the Cedars (1836), in which the Menominee ceded roughly 4,000,000 acres to the United States for $700,000, or roughly $.17 per acre. This land agreement includes much of the Wisconsin Rapids, a section of white water rapids that were located along the Wisconsin River, which have largely been eliminated due to hydrologic projects and channeling.

In 1837, a dam and sawmill were established along the Wisconsin River where the Flowage is today. By 1912, the dam's head was built up to roughly 15.5 ft (4.7 m). In 1916, the Biron Hydroelectric Company decided to build a new concrete dam along the east channel to replace the aging wood-earth dam. By 1923, the new head of the dam reached 20 ft (6.1 m). Today, the Biron Hydroelectric Project operates the dam, while the Wisconsin Department of Natural Resources manages the reservoir. The current federal license for the dam was extended in 2003, and will last until June 26, 2033. The lake is noted for having an abundant and diverse population of Muskellunge and Northern pike. There is one public boat launch available at the reservoir.

== Habitat ==
The reservoir and its surrounding woodland provide habitat to a number of species of birds, mammals, amphibians, and fish including:

- Muskellunge
- Northern pike
- Walleye
- Smallmouth bass
- Largemouth bass
- Panfish
- Sturgeon
- Bullhead
- Perch
- White suckers
- Carp
- Muskrats
- Mallard duck
- Teal
- Scaup
- Pintail
- Beaver
- White-tailed deer
- Muskrat
- Raccoon
- Squirrels
- Rabbits
- Moles
- Bats
- American bullfrog
- American toad
- Northern leopard frog
- Blue-spotted salamander
- Eastern newt
- Mud puppy
- Tiger salamander
