= Germantown, Juneau County, Wisconsin =

Town of Germantown, Wisconsin
- Town
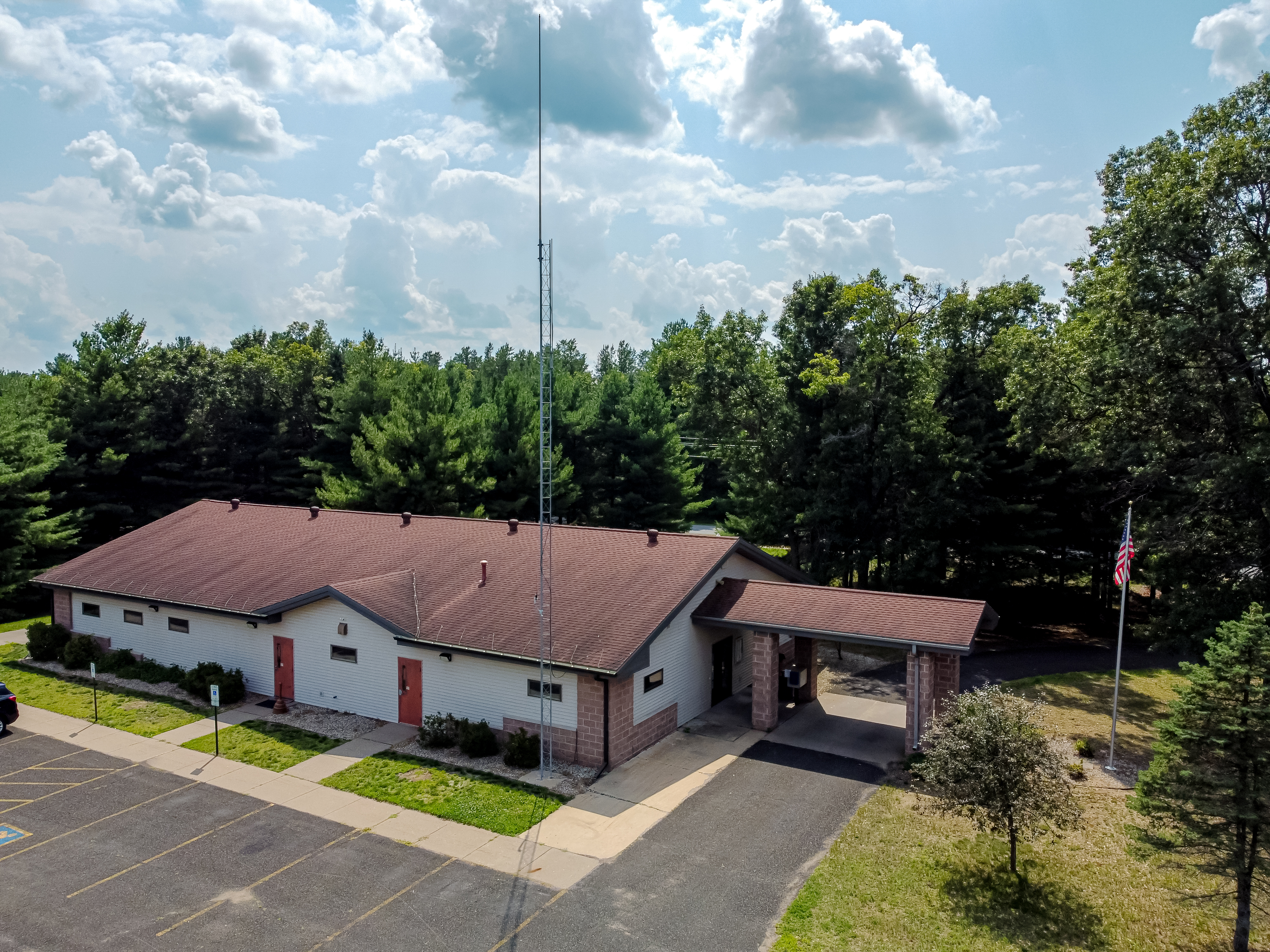
- Town hall

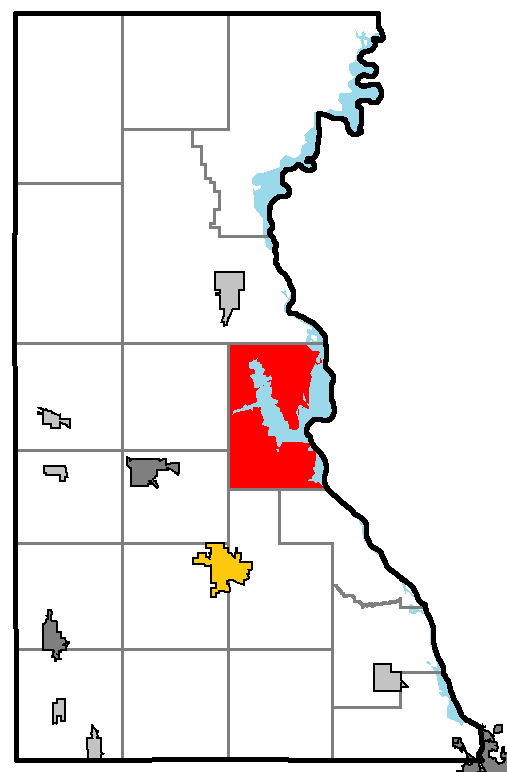
- Location of the Town of Germantown, Juneau County

- Location of Juneau County, Wisconsin
- Coordinates: 43°54′45″N 90°1′48″W
- Country: United States
- State: Wisconsin
- County: Juneau

Area
  - Total: 45.0 sq mi (116.5 km^{2})
  - Land: 33 sq mi (86 km^{2})
  - Water: 11.8 sq mi (30.5 km^{2})
- Elevation: 883 ft (269 m)

Population (2020)
  - Total: 1,628
  - Density: 49/sq mi (19/km^{2})
- Time zone: UTC-6 (Central (CST))
  - Summer (DST): UTC-5 (CDT)
- Area code: 608
- FIPS code: 55-28850
- GNIS feature ID: 1583268

The Town of Germantown is in Juneau County, Wisconsin, United States. At the 2020 census, the town population was 1,628.

== Geography ==
According to the United States Census Bureau, the town has a total area of 45 square miles (116.5 km^{2}), of which 33.2 square miles (86 km^{2}) is land and 11.8 square miles (30.5 km^{2}) (26.18%) is water.

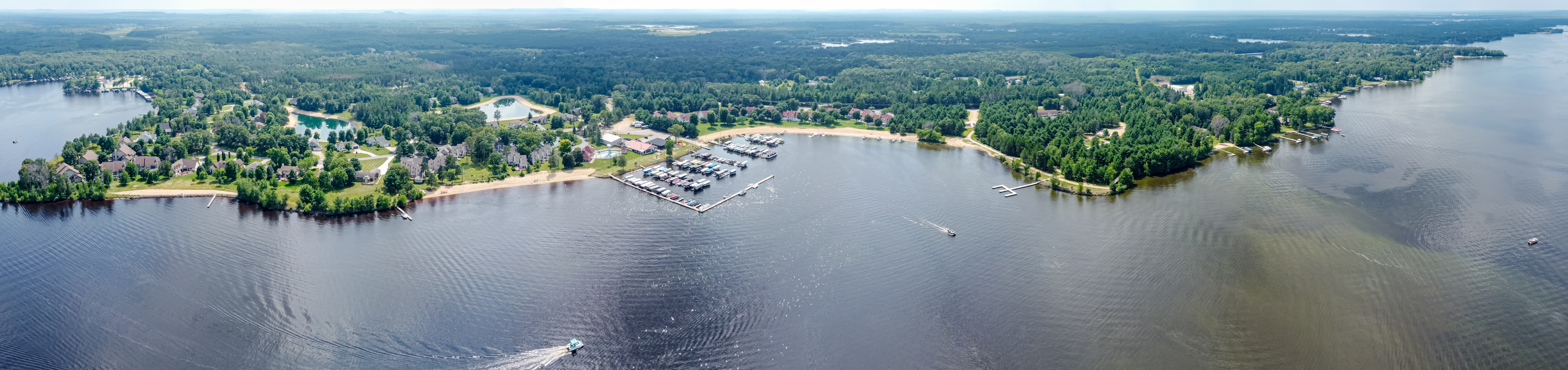
On Castle Rock Lake

== Demographics ==
At the 2000 census, there were 1,174 people, 535 households and 385 families residing in the town. The population density was 35.3 per square mile (13.6/km^{2}). There were 1,344 housing units at an average density of 40.5 per square mile (15.6/km^{2}). The racial makeup of the town was 97.19% White, 0.17% African American, 1.36% Native American, 0.34% Asian, 0.09% from other races, and 0.85% from two or more races. Hispanic or Latino people of any race were 1.28% of the population.

There were 535 households, of which 19.6% had children under the age of 18 living with them, 60.2% were married couples living together, 7.9% had a female householder with no husband present, and 27.9% were non-families. 23.6% of all households were made up of individuals, and 10.7% had someone living alone who was 65 years of age or older. The average household size was 2.19 and the average family size was 2.52.

17.4% of the population were under the age of 18, 4.7% from 18 to 24, 21.6% from 25 to 44, 33.9% from 45 to 64, and 22.4% who were 65 years of age or older. The median age was 49 years. For every 100 females, there were 107.8 males. For every 100 females age 18 and over, there were 108.2 males.

The median household income was $31,204 and the median family income was $33,646. Males had a median income of $31,447 and females $21,736. The per capita income was $17,815. About 9.4% of families and 12% of the population were below the poverty line, including 19.8% of those under age 18 and 8.8% of those age 65 or over.
