= Castle Rock Lake =

Artificial lake in Wisconsin, United States

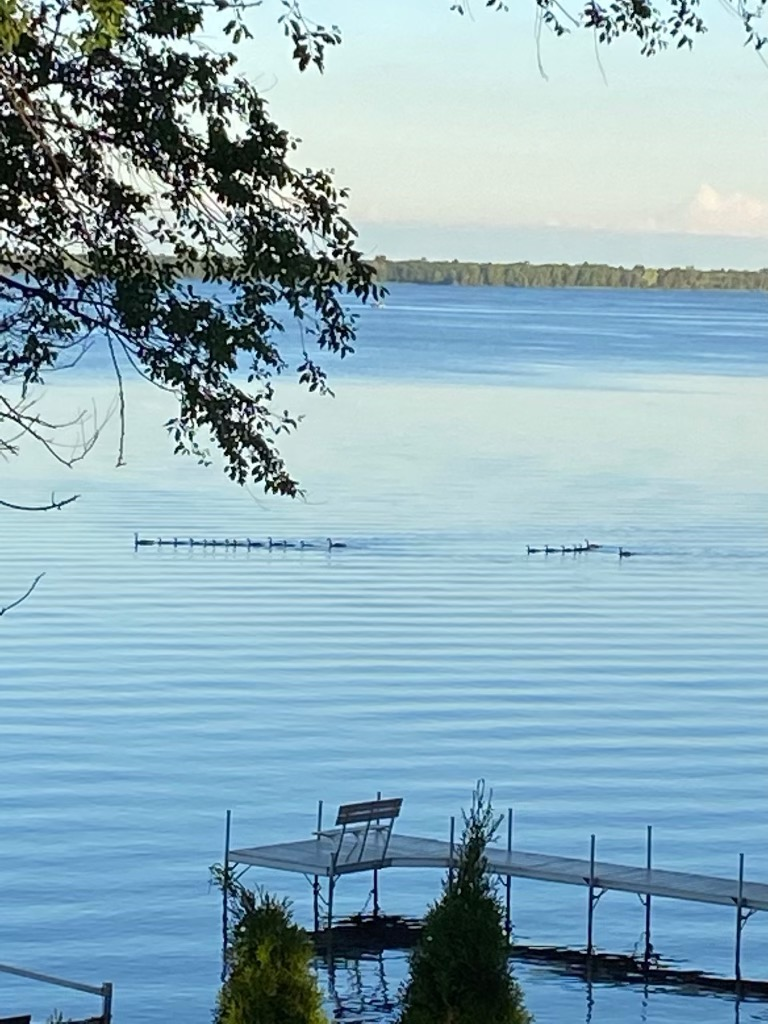
- Castle Rock Lake from the shoreline

- Location within Wisconsin Castle Rock Lake (the United States)
- Location: Adams and Juneau County, Wisconsin, U.S.
- Group: Petenwell and Castle Rock Stewards
- Coordinates: 43.9258°N 89.9680°W
- Type: Drainage Basin
- Primary inflows: Yellow River, Little Yellow River, Pentwell Lake, Big Roche a Cri, and Klein Creek.
- Primary outflows: Wisconsin River
- Basin countries: United States
- Built: 1951
- Max. length: 11 mi (18 km)
- Max. width: 4.3 mi (6.9 km)
- Surface area: 16,640 acres (6,730 ha)
- Average depth: 13.4 ft (4.1 m)
- Max. depth: 35 ft (11 m)
- Water volume: 172,000 acre⋅ft (212,000,000 m^{3})
- Shore length^{1}: 72.9 miles (117.3 km)
- Surface elevation: 885 ft (270 m)
- Max. temperature: 82.8 °F (28.2 °C)
- Min. temperature: 35.4 °F (1.9 °C)
- Settlements: Germantown, Quincy, and Dellwood
- ^{1} Shore length is not a well-defined measure.

Castle Rock Lake is an artificial lake on the Wisconsin River. It is located in central Wisconsin in Adams County and Juneau County. The lake has an inflow from Petenwell Lake, Yellow River, Big Roche a Cri., and Klien Creek. It has a surface area of 16,640 acres (67.3 km^{2}) and its depth varies from 8–20 ft (2.4–6.1 m) in most places, with area in the old river beds reaching as deep as 35 ft (11 m).

Castle Rock Lake is the fourth largest lake in Wisconsin, it covers sixteen thousand acres, and has approximately seventy miles of shoreline. Castle Rock Lake is home to a large variety of fish, birds, and many other organisms. The large body of water attracts many people to the area as well, it provides for recreational hobbies such as: bird watching, boating, fishing, and recreational water sports.

== History ==
Castle Rock Lake is situated within the ancient bed of Glacial Lake Wisconsin. Prior to the completion of the Castle Rock Dam in 1951, the area held farmlands, vast prairies, and forested knolls separated by the Wisconsin River.

The Wisconsin River Valley supported human life for over 10,000 years, and was inhabited by Indigenous Ho-Chunk and Menominee people. The landscape surrounding Castle Rock Lake has several prehistoric antiquities, mainly the Effigy mounds and Petroglyphs at Roche-A-Cri Rock. The mounds take on the form of multiple shapes and creatures; including crests, panthers, and outstretched birds. They varied in size, both in height and width, some extending as far as a football field. Selected mounds have been known to be grave sites for people or tools; while others hold no purpose other than to be a magnificent earthwork to look upon. Just northeast of Castle Rock Lake, a large out of place rock formation can be seen, Roche-A-Chi Rock. On the southwest face, a cave holds ancient artwork. The artwork varies in drawings including birds, canoes, animal tracks, phases of the moon, and man. Archeologists claim that the pictures were painted after 900 A.D. The Ho-Chunk people were believed to have used these portrayals for an assortment of purposes including record keeping, storytelling and even politics. While the exact translation may have been lost, similar to the effigy mounds, they both tell a unique history about the people who first inhabited the area around Castle Rock Lake.

Castle Rock Lake was created as the result of a hydropower project initiated by the Wisconsin River Power Company (WRPCO) in tandem with the related Petenwell Dam and Reservoir to dam the Wisconsin River. Construction of the Castle Rock Dam was started in 1947 and completed 4 years later in 1951. The dam is 11.6 metres (38 ft) high, 5,700 m (18,700 ft) long at is crest, with a maximum water capacity of 175,000 acre⋅ft (216,000,000 m^{3}).

== Physical aspects ==
=== Geography and geology ===
Castle Rock Lake is located in Central Wisconsin between Adams County and Juneau County, at the coordinates 43.9258° the surrounding area of the lake consists of mostly flood plains. The elevation of the lake itself is at a mean sea level of 882 feet (268.834 m). The parent material in the area is mixed sandy alluvium, the A Horizon consists of loamy sand, and the B Horizon consists of sand.

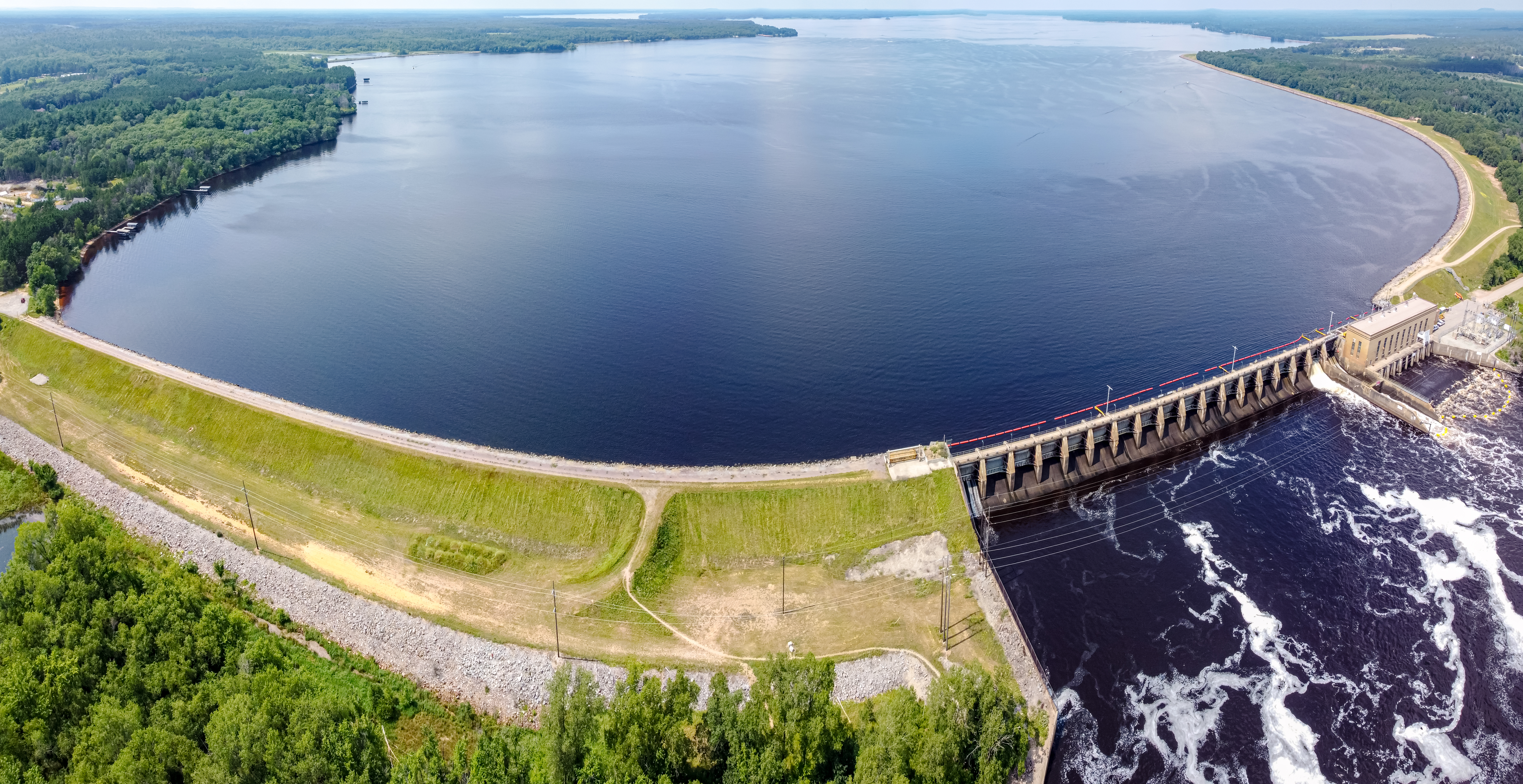

=== Hydrology ===
Maximum fetch:(km): 16.371 km

Maximum surface wave height(m): 1.34m

Minimum water temperature (°C): 1.9 °C

Maximum water temperature (°C): 28.2 °C

Daily total undepleted solar radiation (cal cm^{−2} day^{−1}) by season:

- Spring: 408.70- 430.21 cal cm^{−2} day^{−1}
- Summer: ≥ 494.75 cal cm^{−2} day^{−1}
- Autumn: < 344.17 cal cm^{−2} day^{−1}
- Winter: < 344.17 cal cm^{−2} day^{−1}

Average percentage sunlight reflected:

- Summer: Between 1-10%*
- Winter: Between 1-10%*

Secchi disk depth (m):1 m (3.3 ft.)

=== Water chemistry and quality ===
The equilibrium concentration of dissolved oxygen in the surface waters at varying temperature are:

- 4 °C: 12.3 mg/L (7.69*10^{−4} mol/L)
- 10 °C: 11.5 mg/L (7.19*10^{−4}mol/L)
- 20 °C: 7.1 mg/L (4.44*10^{−4}mol/L)
- 25 °C: 5.2 mg/L (3.25*10^{−4}mol/L)

The average pH of Castle Rock Lake is 7.2

The total dissolved organic carbon is 17 mg L^{−1}

The chlorophyll a levels are: 6 μg L^{−1}

Total alkalinity (mg/L and meq/L): 32 (mg/L)

Hardness (mg/L): 91 mg/L

== Wildlife ==
=== Flora ===
Chart depicting the biological makeup percentages of central Wisconsin habitats

The aquatic plant life of Castle Rock Lake is essential to the fish and other fauna that inhabit the lake. The most common species are fragrant water-lily, common duckweed, coontail, and Eurasian water-milfoil. The fragrant water-lily, common duckweed, and contail are all native species to Castle Rock Lake and provided a substantial amount of habitat for the many fish that populate the lake. Eurasian water-milfoil is an invasive species to Castle Rock Lake and it is being monitored by the Wisconsin Department of Natural Resources and Petenwell and Castle Rock Stewards (PACRS).

The area surrounding Castle Rock Lake is mostly central sand plains and some forested areas. Some of the dominant tree species are jack pine, red pine, black oak, white oak, and balsam fir. Ferns are also very common in areas around the lake, some of the species present are Northern maiden hair fern, lady fern, and common bracken. Other common plant species are common milkweed, lady slippers, sundial lupine, black-eyed Susan, European raspberry, and Allegheny blackberry. Two common grasses are little bluestem and big bluestem.

=== Fauna ===
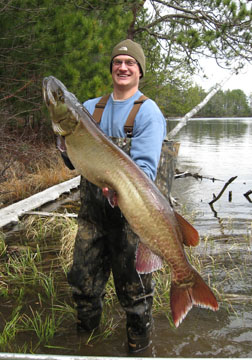
The muskellunge (Esox masquinongy) is one of Wisconsin's most important and unique trophies. It is so highly valued that the State Legislature proclaimed it the official State Fish in 1955.

The structure created from the river beds makes Castle Rock Lake a productive and consistent fishing lake. Species such as walleye, white bass, and crappie are the most abundant, but many other species like northern pike, large mouth bass, small mouth bass, bluegills, redbreast sunfish, and perch are caught as well. Muskellunge (Musky), sturgeon, and catfish are also known to be present but in smaller numbers than other noted species. The lake is also known for being a winter refuge for bald eagle and a location the Wisconsin DNR is attempting to bring back wild osprey and wood duck populations too. In addition to the DNR's efforts the Federal Energy Regulatory Commission (FERC), UW-SP, and WRPCO have designated the area a wildlife refuge and completed a management plan for the refuge.

The area surrounding Castle Rock Lake creates a habitat for many animal species, including a wide range of amphibians, mammals, and reptiles. Three of the most common amphibians are the green frog, spring peeper, and blue-spotted salamander. There is a wide variety of mammals that inhabit the natural landscape around Castle Rock Lake. The most common mammals are white-tailed deer, American red squirrel, common raccoon, and muskrat. Reptiles are present in and around Castle Rock Lake. Turtles are the most common reptile that live in Castle Rock, some common species are snapping turtle, painted turtle, and Blanding's turtle. Other species of reptiles that live in the area surrounding the lake are eastern hognose snake, common garter snake, and common five-lined skink.

== Environmental concerns ==
=== Bacteria ===
Castle Rock Lake has encountered several environmental concerns including, blue-green algae, invasive species, and shoreline development. In the summer of 2009 Petenwell Lake and Castle Rock Lake both had obvious signs of blue-green algae growth. The algae floats on the surface giving the water a "pea green" color and a foul smell. Blue-green algae can have negative impacts on both humans and animals, water with obvious algal blooms should be avoided. Some common symptoms for humans who have come in contact with blue-green algae are rash, eyes/nose/throat irritation, and gastroenteritis.

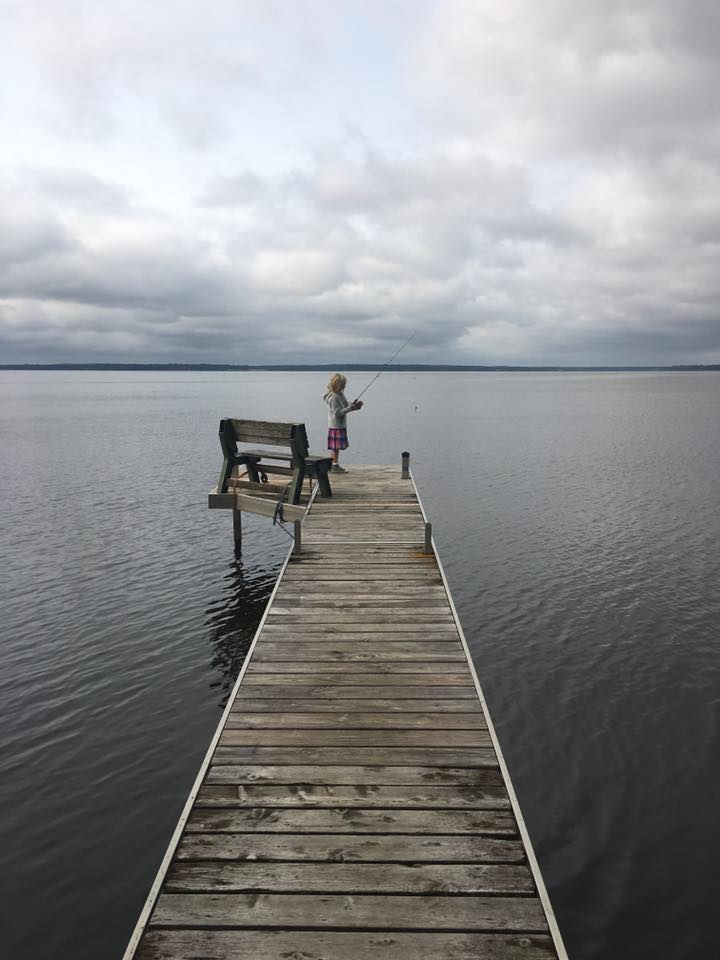
Girl fishing from privately owned dock

=== Invasive species ===
Castle Rock Lake has three observed invasive species, this does not mean they are the only invasive species present at this time. Blue-green algae (also known as Cylindro), Eurasian water-milfoil, and zebra mussel are the three invasive species noted by the Wisconsin Department of Natural Resources. Blue-green algae has harmful effects on the aquatic environment as well as humans and animals who come into contact with it. Eurasian water-milfoil is an invasive plant species that crowds out native species and inhibits growth. This plant is native to Europe, Asia, and North Africa, it likely found its way to the United States through the aquarium trade or watercraft. Zebra mussels are also found in Castle Rock Lake, they compete with native species and consume the vegetation in the lake. Zebra mussels are also native to Europe and Asia, the zebra mussels came to the United States in ballast water from large ships. The Wisconsin Department of Natural Resources is aware of all three invasive species and have remediation plans in place for them.

=== Pollution ===
A large portion of the land around the Wisconsin River Basin is used as farmland, it has been discovered that farmland produces a significant amount of runoff that impacts the waterways. The main pollutant in the runoff from farmland is phosphorus, when the phosphorus makes its way into the waterways it can be detrimental. Excessive nutrients, in particular phosphorus, enable the growth of algae which frequently causes harmful/toxic algal blooms. Castle Rock Lake had a toxic blue-green algae bloom in the summer of 2009, the likely cause was phosphorus runoff. There are Environmental Protection Agency and Wisconsin Department of Natural Resources projects in place to create solutions that will lower the rate of phosphorus pollution into the waterways.

== Human uses ==
On the Juneau County side (west side), with the exception of Buckhorn State Park and Yellow River State Wildlife Area, the shoreline is more developed. There has been an influx of resort-type developments with small, man-made private lakes and deeded private docks access to Castle Rock Lake in the last few years. The majority of shoreline is undeveloped making the lake "less populated" and ideal for boating and skiing. There is also three major beaches Castle Rock Park, Castle Rock County Park Beach, and Buckhorn State Park Beach located around the lake. The lake is also a hot spot for local anglers with ten boat launches available to the public located all around the lakes expansive shorelines, it even hosts fishing tournaments. Castle Rock Lake is also a huge resource for the surrounding areas because of the hydroelectric dam located on the southern shoreline which provides energy to nearby settlements.

== Figures and tables ==
Temperature vs depth on Castle Rock Lake in summer

Temperature vs depth charts on Castle Rock Lake in fall

Temperature vs depth charts on Castle Rock Lake in winter

Temperature vs depth charts on Castle Rock Lake in spring

Percent Oxygen Saturation Vs. Depth on Castle Rock Lake

Dissolved Oxygen vs. Depth on Castle Rock Lake
