= Yellow River (Wisconsin River tributary) =

River in the U.S. state of Wisconsin

Coordinates: 43°54′23″N 89°58′59″W

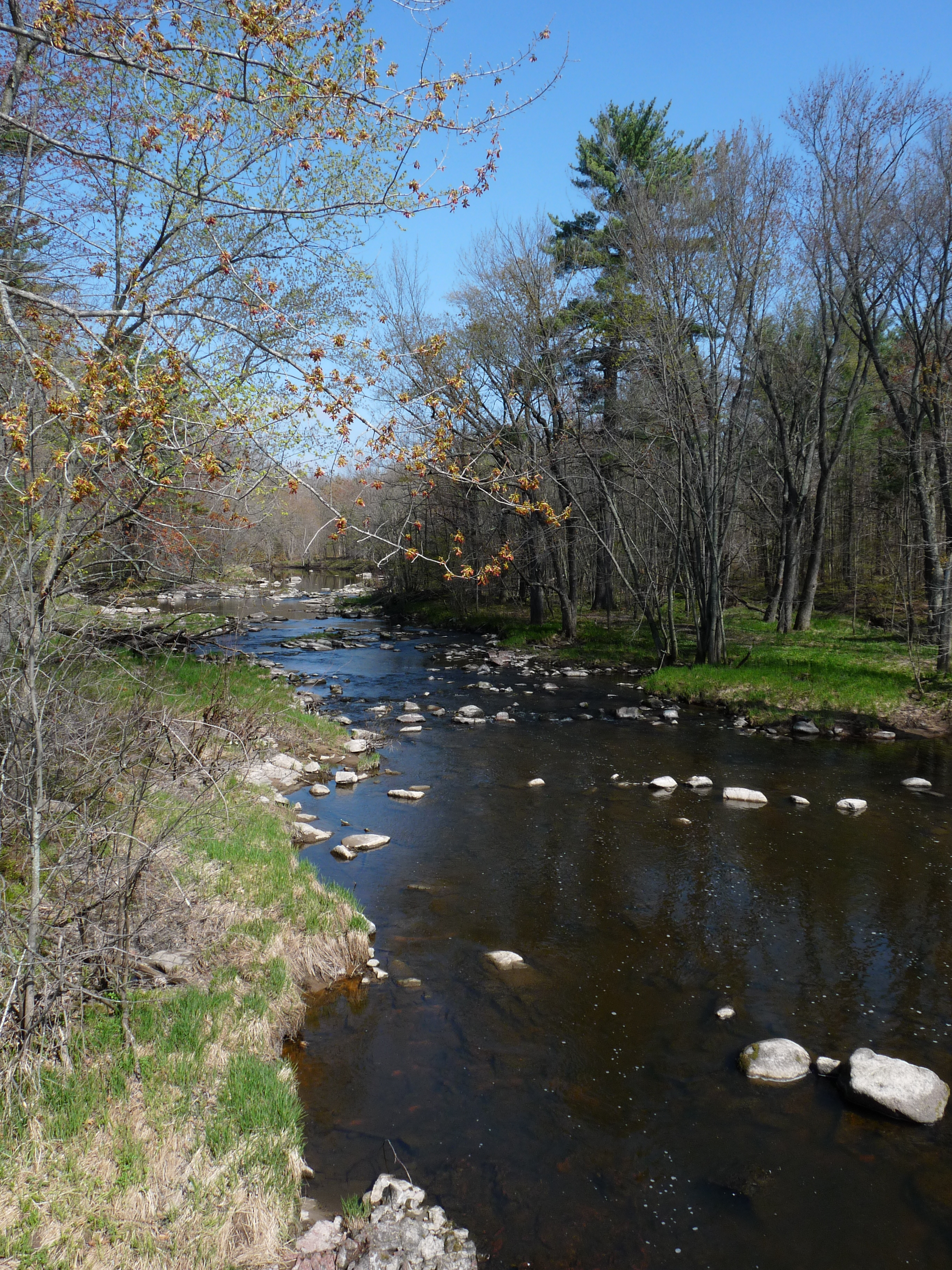
The upper Yellow River in April after spring floods, at County N in Wood County

The Yellow River is a tributary of the Wisconsin River in Clark, Wood and Juneau counties in the U.S. state of Wisconsin.

The Yellow River originates in eastern Clark County. It flows south through Pittsville, Dexter and Babcock in Wood County, and Necedah in Juneau County. Past Necedah, it flows into Castle Rock Lake where it meets the Wisconsin River near Buckhorn State Park. In Dexterville it is dammed to create Lake Dexter. The stretch from Necedah to Castle Rock Lake has numerous oxbows.

In the Menominee language, the river is known as Mēkon-Sēpēw, "plume or feather river".

== Tributaries ==
Tributaries of the Yellow River include:

- Puff Creek

== See also ==
- List of rivers of Wisconsin
