= Chute Pond Dam =

- U.S. National Register of Historic Places
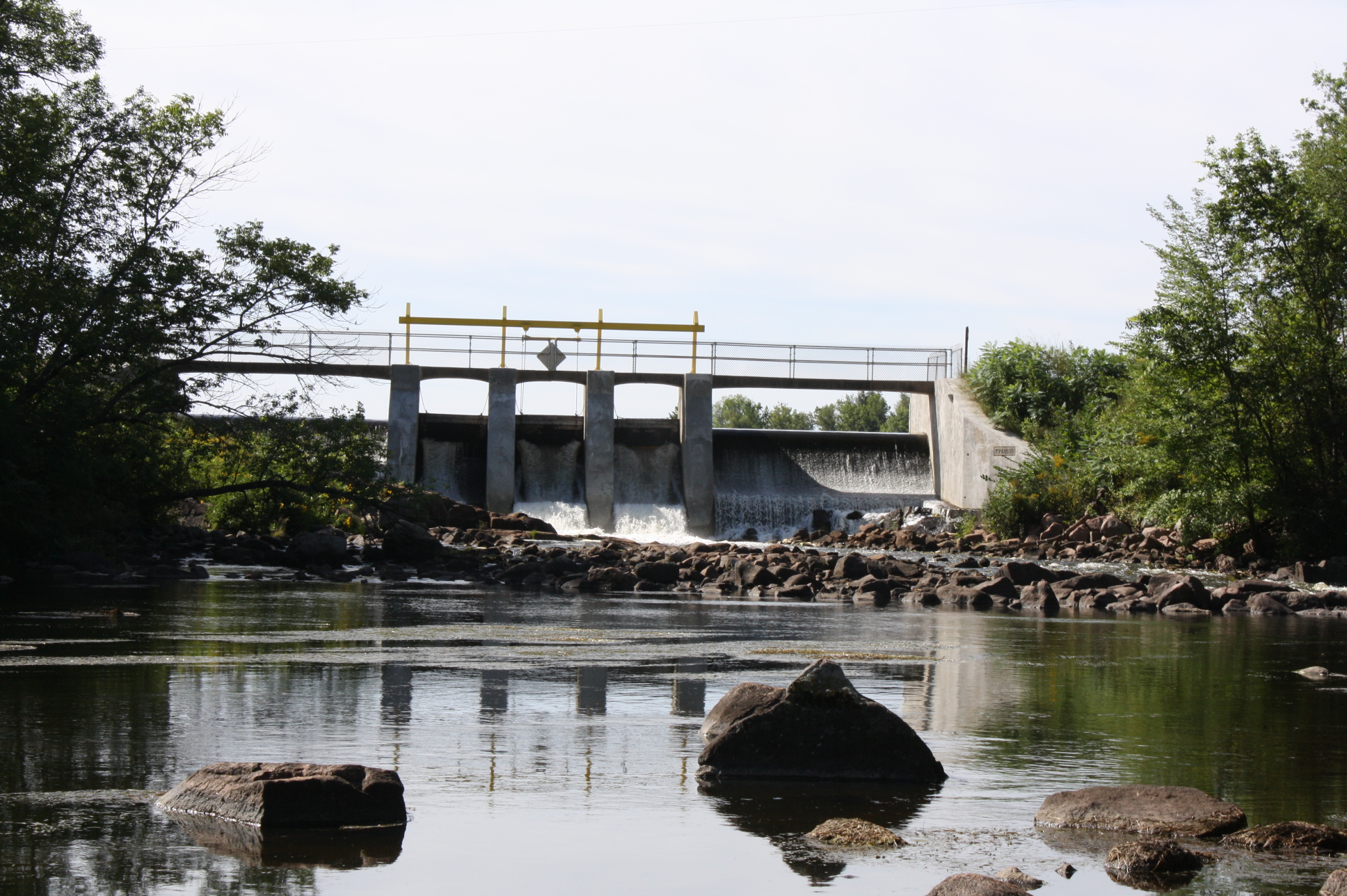
- Chute Pond Dam

- Location within Wisconsin Location within the United States
- Location: Mountain, Wisconsin
- Coordinates: 45°07′52″N 88°26′35″W
- Built: 1937
- NRHP reference No.: 10000269
- Added to NRHP: May 17, 2010

The Chute Pond Dam is located in Mountain, Wisconsin. It was added to the National Register of Historic Places in 2010.

== History ==
The dam was built by the Works Progress Administration of the New Deal. It is located on the site of an old log dam.
