= Petenwell Lake =

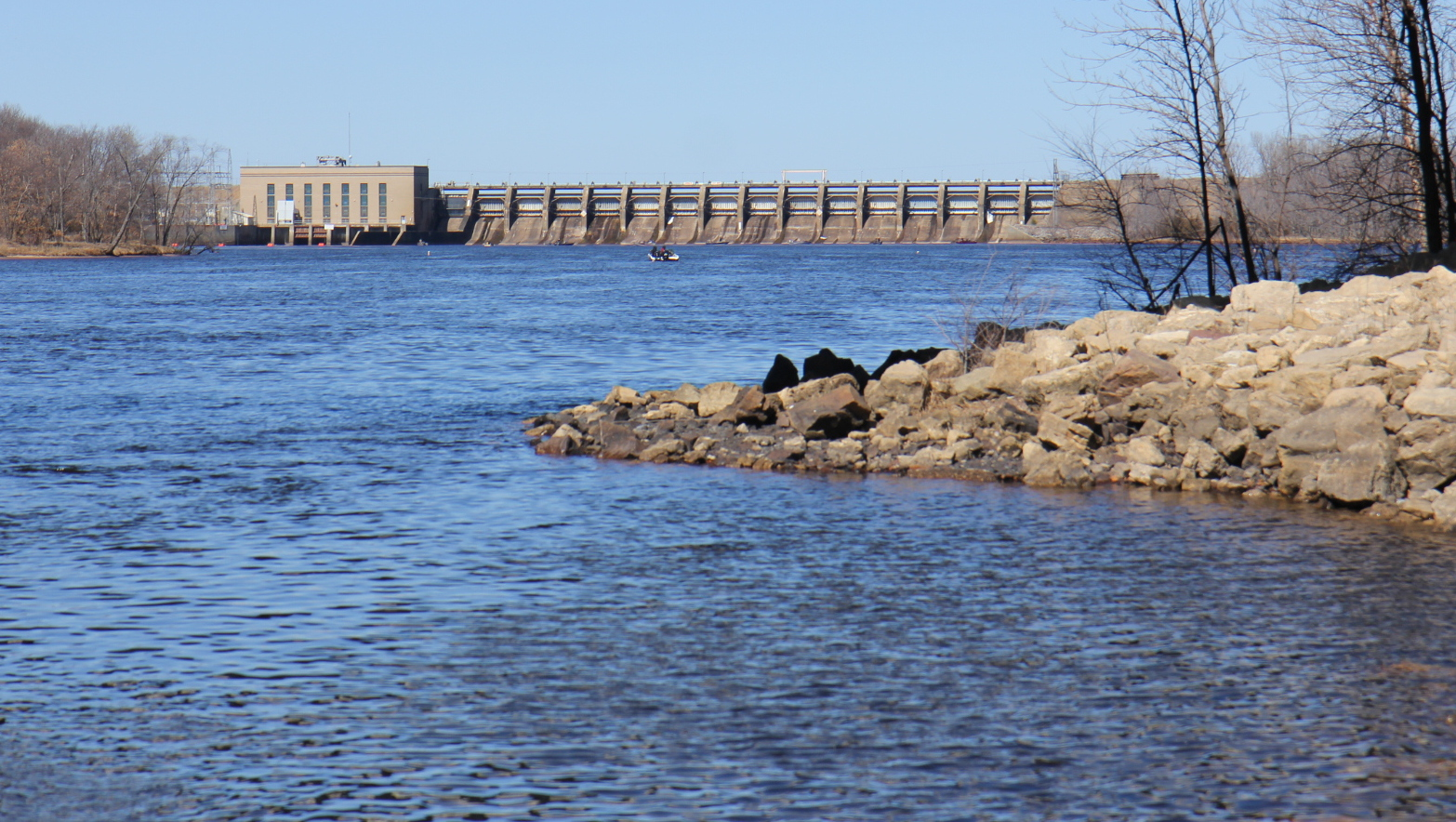
- Dam which forms Lake Petenwell

- Location within Wisconsin Location within the United States
- Location: Adams / Juneau / Wood counties, Wisconsin, US
- Coordinates: 44°08′06″N 89°58′16″W
- Type: artificial lake
- Basin countries: United States
- Surface area: 23,173 acres (9,378 ha)
- Max. depth: 42 ft (13 m)
- Surface elevation: 892 ft (272 m)

Lake Petenwell is an artificial lake on the Wisconsin River in central Wisconsin. It is located in Adams, Juneau, and Wood counties next to Castle Rock Lake. It covers over 23,000 acres (93 km^{2}) and is 42 feet (13 m) deep.

Lake Petenwell is Wisconsin's second largest lake entirely within its borders at 23,040 acres (93.2 km^{2}) or approximately 36 square miles, behind Lake Winnebago. It was created in 1948 by the Wisconsin River Power Company with the construction of a dam across the Wisconsin River near Necedah. It has a maximum depth of 42 feet (13 m) and is used for water skiing, sailing and fishing. Private lakefront property is very limited as most of the virgin shoreline is undeveloped forest. Wildlife includes wintering bald eagles. Game fish include walleye, northern pike, largemouth bass, smallmouth bass, sturgeon, catfish, panfish, and muskellunge.

The area around the lake has restaurants, a community theater, a golf course and two casinos.

In 1973, the Juneau County extension resource agent submitted a letter on behalf of the County Industrial-Recreation, and Agriculture and Education Committees to the Wisconsin Power and Light Company requesting a nuclear power plant be constructed near the lake.

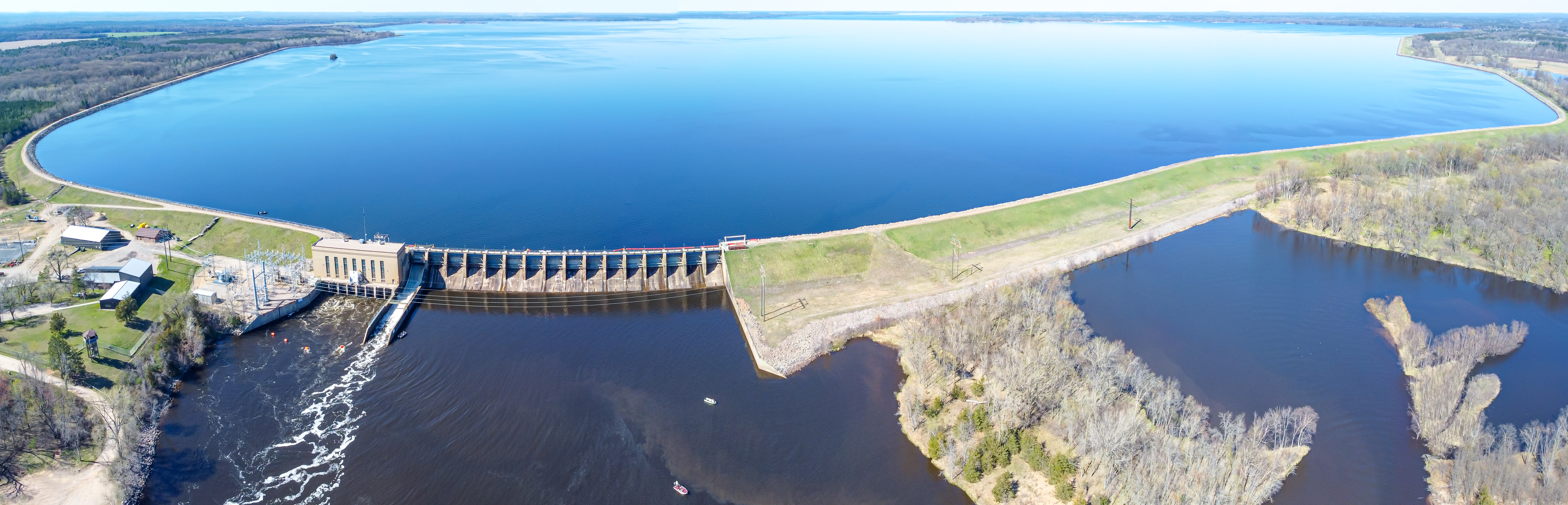

== Algae ==
Blue-green algae was reported in the lake in 2013. In 2019, Adams County website stated that the beaches were not closed due to algae, and that the situation was being monitored.
