= Buckhorn State Park =

State park in Juneau County, Wisconsin

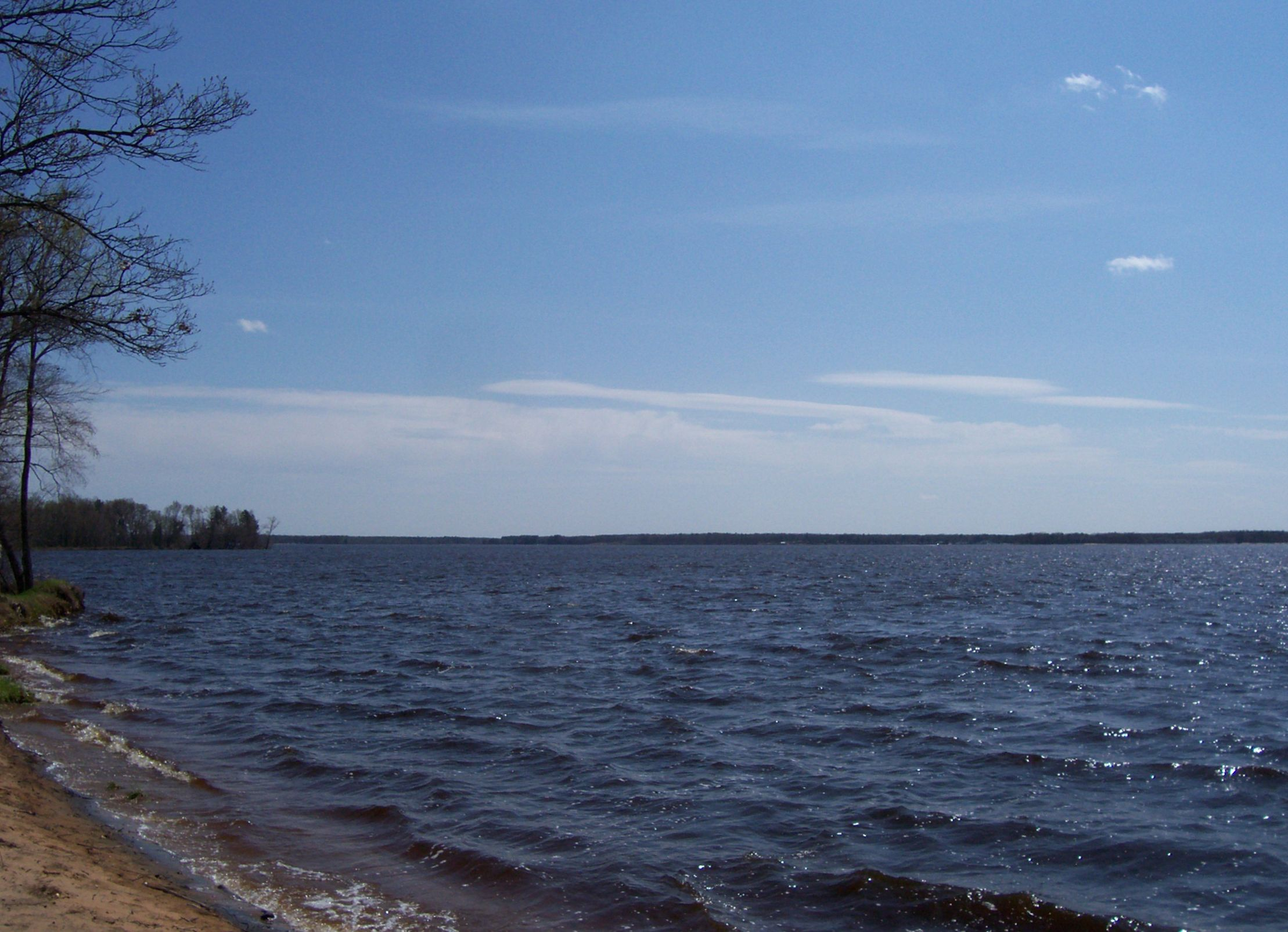

- Location within Wisconsin Location within the United States
- Interactive map of Buckhorn State Park
- Location: Juneau County, Wisconsin, United States
- Coordinates: 43°56′21″N 90°0′14″W
- Area: 6,990 acres (2,830 ha)
- Elevation: 883 ft (269 m)
- Established: 1971
- Administrator: Wisconsin Department of Natural Resources
- Website: Official website
- Wisconsin State Parks

Buckhorn State Park is a 6,990-acre (2,829 ha) Wisconsin state park southeast of Necedah. The park occupies a peninsula on Castle Rock Lake, a reservoir formed at the confluence of the Wisconsin and Yellow rivers.

A portion of the park is preserved as Buckhorn Barrens, part of the Wisconsin State Natural Areas Program.

The Department of Natural Resources made multiple land purchases, both large and small, between 1974 and 2009 with the aim of allowing the land to return to a natural state. The park's various environments include floodplain forest, prairie, savanna and desert-like areas. Recreational features include boating, biking, camping, fishing, swimming and winter activities.

== Gallery ==
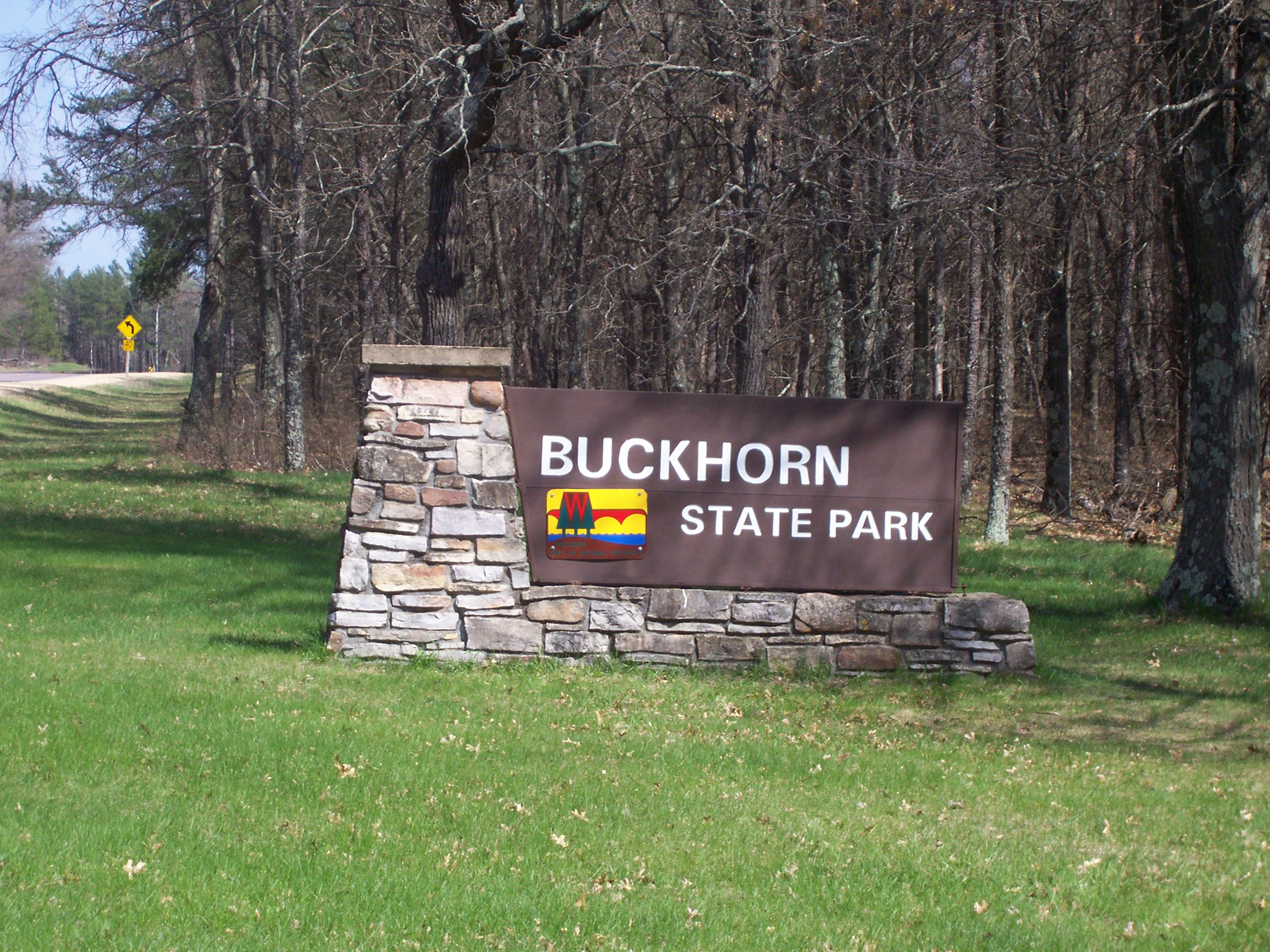
Sign

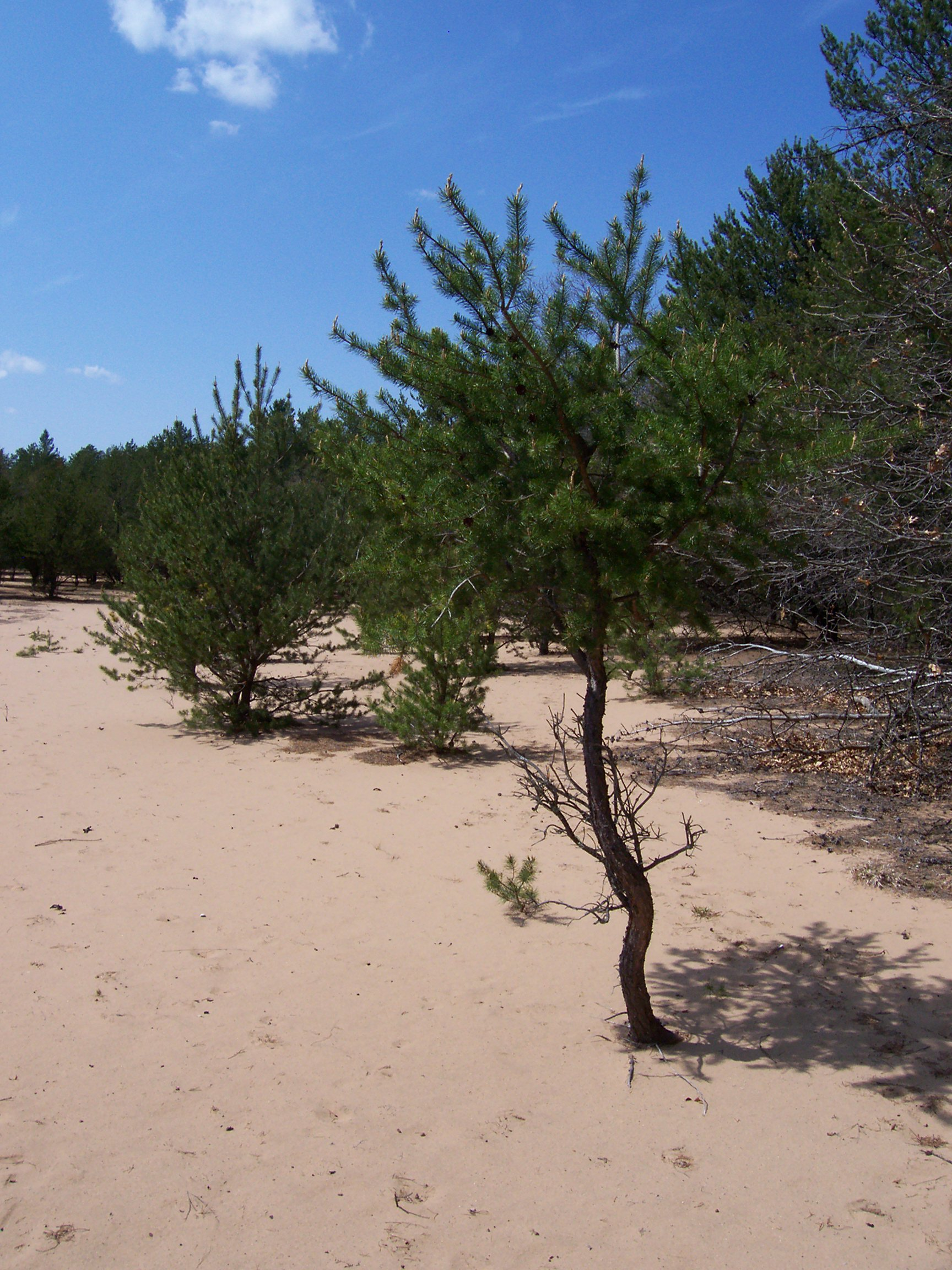
Sandy area

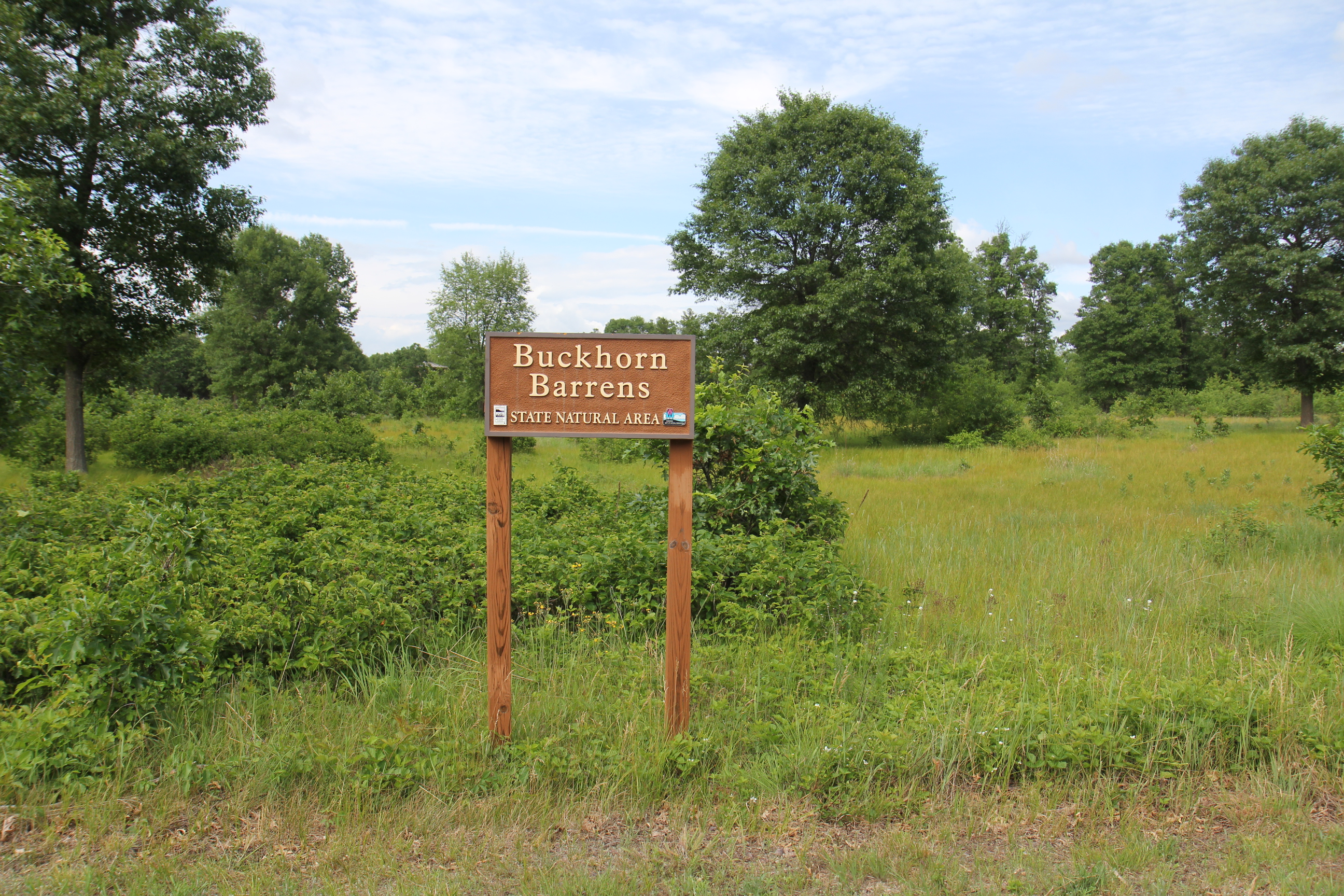
Buckhorn Barrens

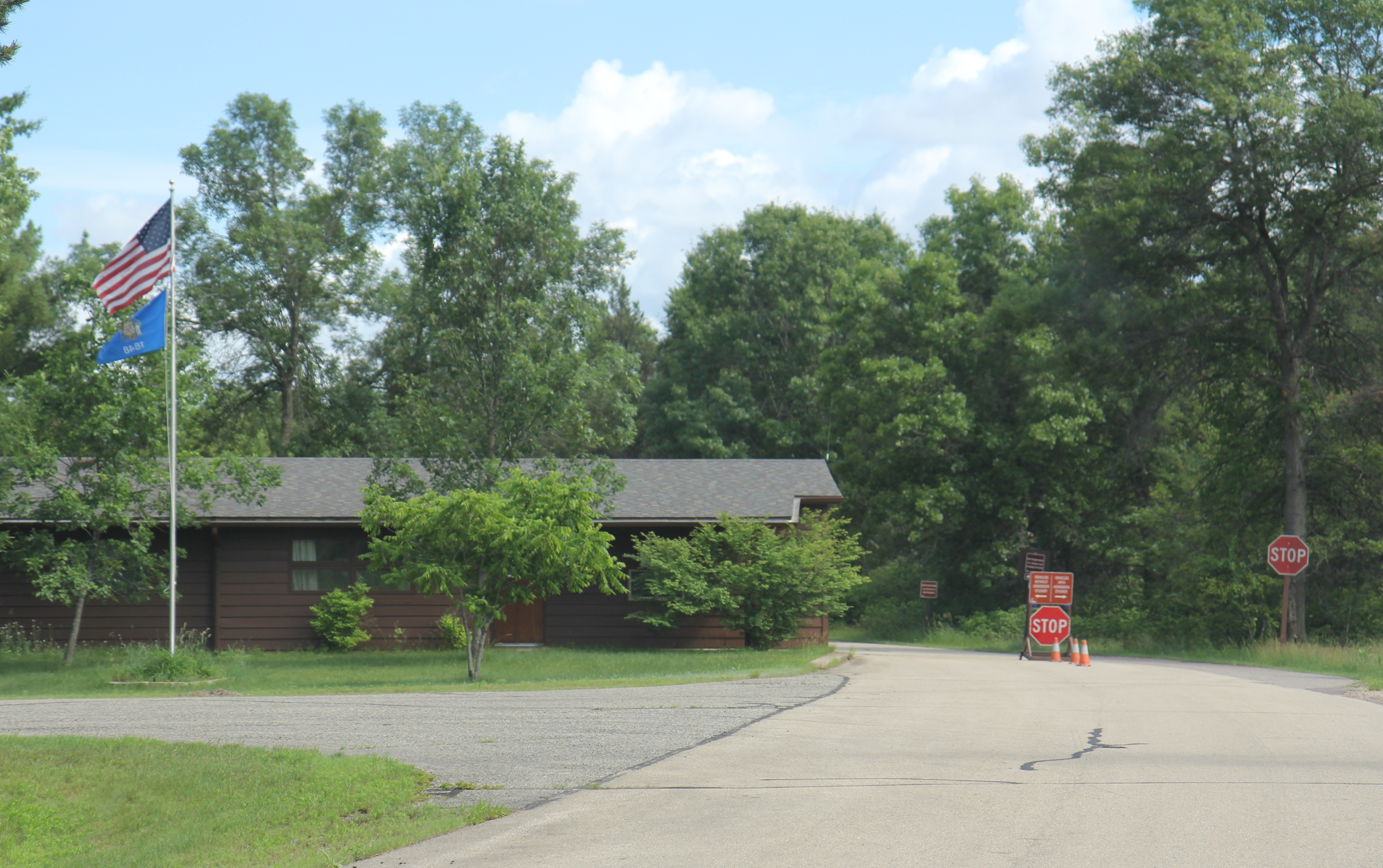
Office
