= Roche-a-Cri State Park =

State park in Adams County, Wisconsin

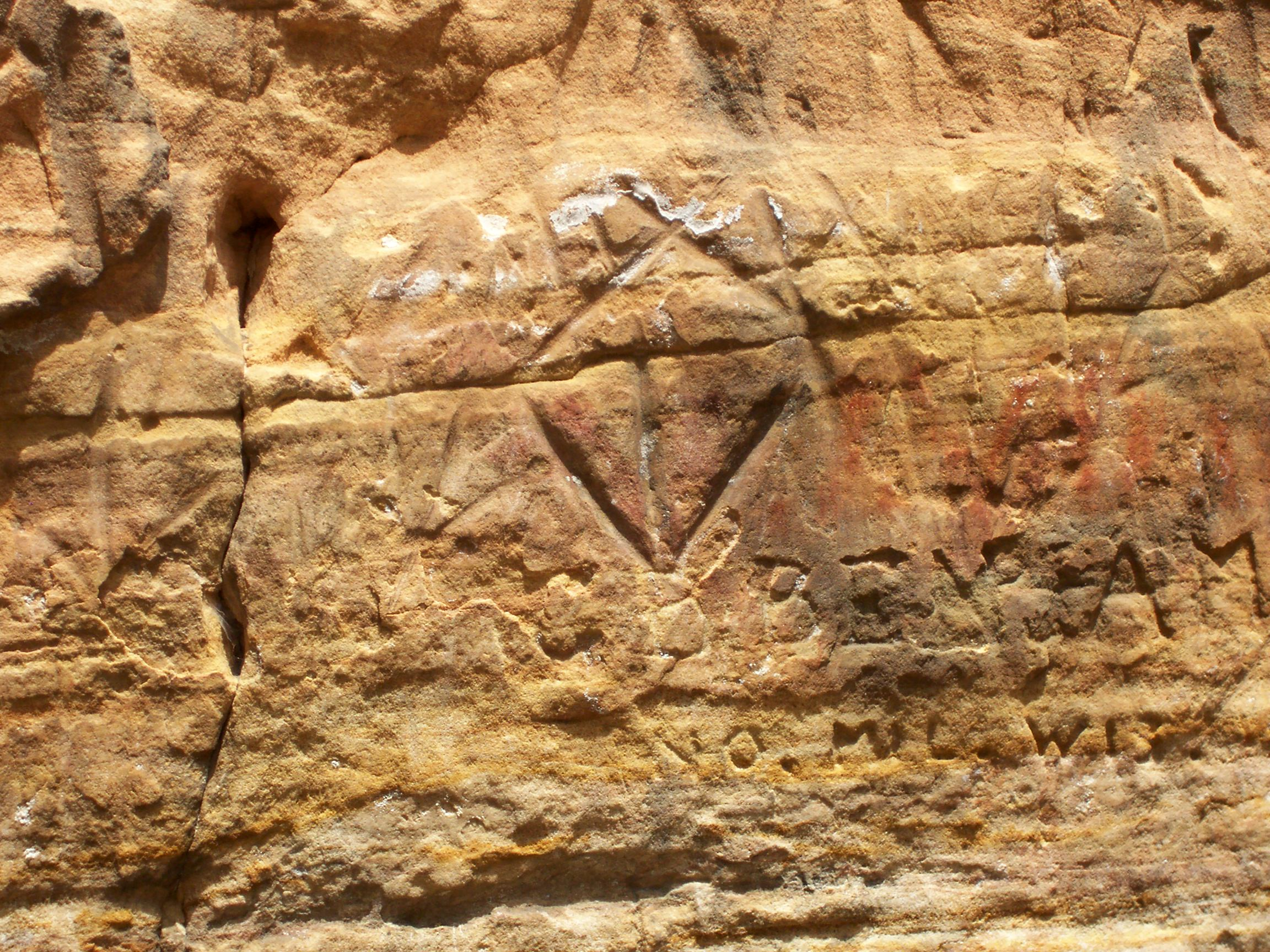
- The Roche-a-Cri Petroglyphs.

- Location within Wisconsin Location within the United States
- Interactive map of Roche-a-Cri State Park
- Location: Adams County, Wisconsin, United States
- Coordinates: 44°0′9″N 89°49′7″W
- Area: 605 acres (245 ha)
- Elevation: 1,165 ft (355 m)
- Established: 1948
- Administrator: Wisconsin Department of Natural Resources
- Website: Official website
- Wisconsin State Parks

Roche-a-Cri State Park (most commonly translated from French as Screaming Rock) is a state park north of Adams and Friendship in central Wisconsin. The park, 605 acres (245 ha) in area, was established in 1948.

The park features a 300-foot (91 m) rock outcropping with Native American petroglyphs—the Roche-a-Cri Petroglyphs—and a wooden stairway to the top, as well as more than 5 miles (8.0 km) of hiking trails. The petroglyphs are the only publicly accessible rock art site in the state of Wisconsin. In addition to the petroglyphs, other rock art such as a pictograph of a thunderbird and a horned human figure can be found at the park.

== Natural history ==
The striking 300-foot (91 m) bluff is a hard core that remains from a larger sheet of Cambrian sandstone which has mostly eroded away. Around 19,000 to 15,000 years ago it was an island rising above Glacial Lake Wisconsin. On top of the bluff grow red oak, black oak, white oak, red pine, white pine, and jack pine. Buzzards also haunt the top.

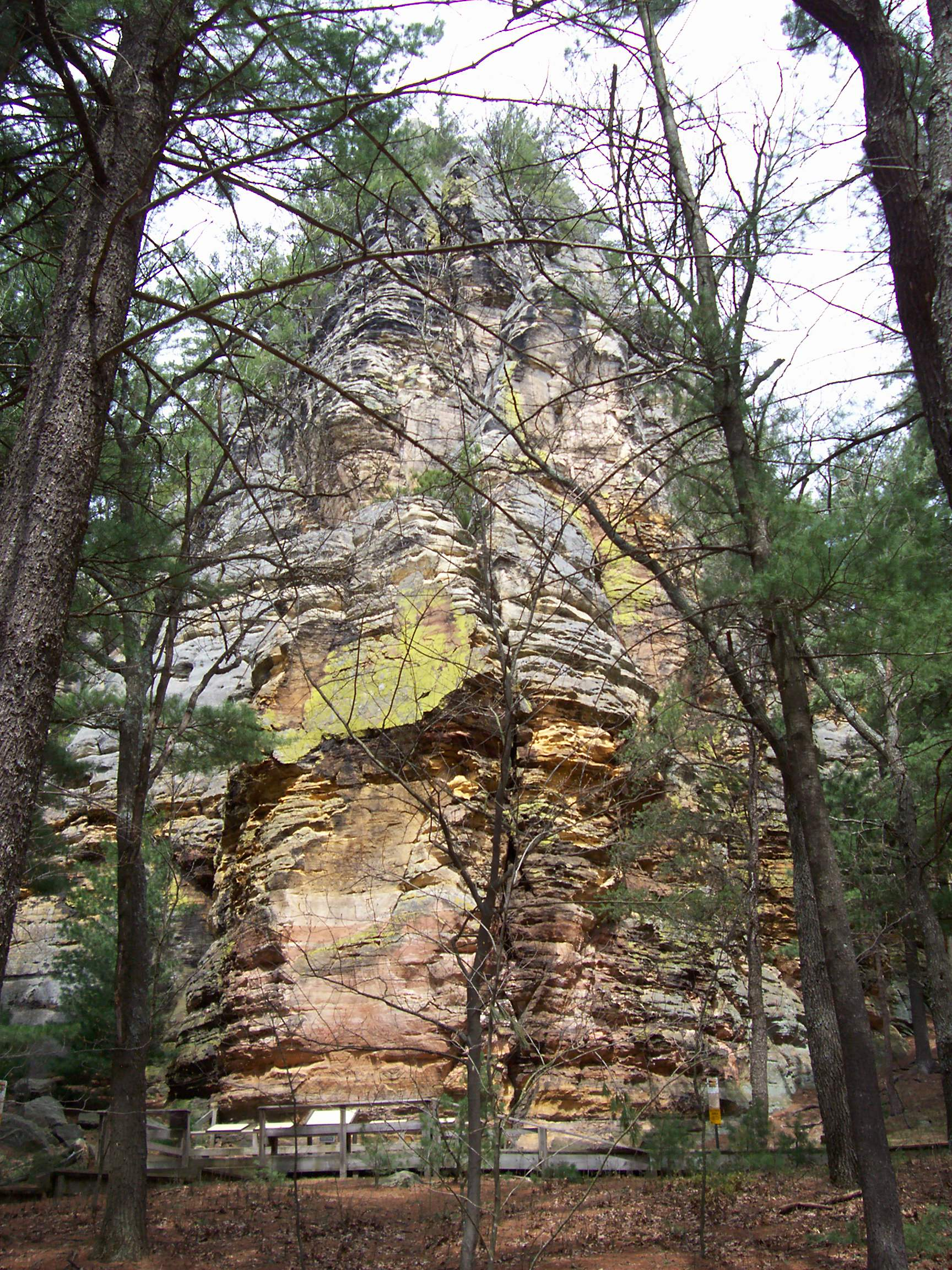
Outcropping rock

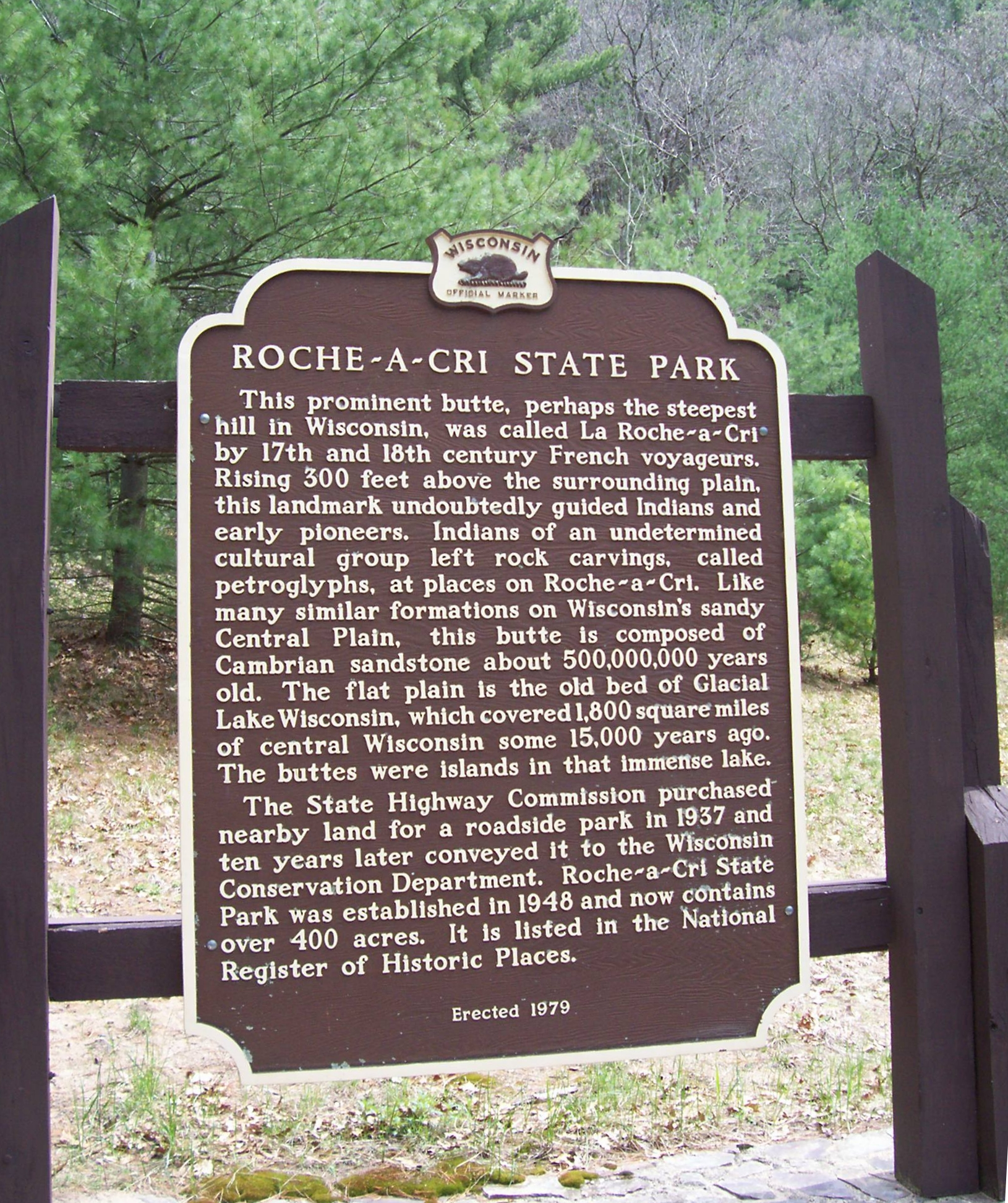
Sign

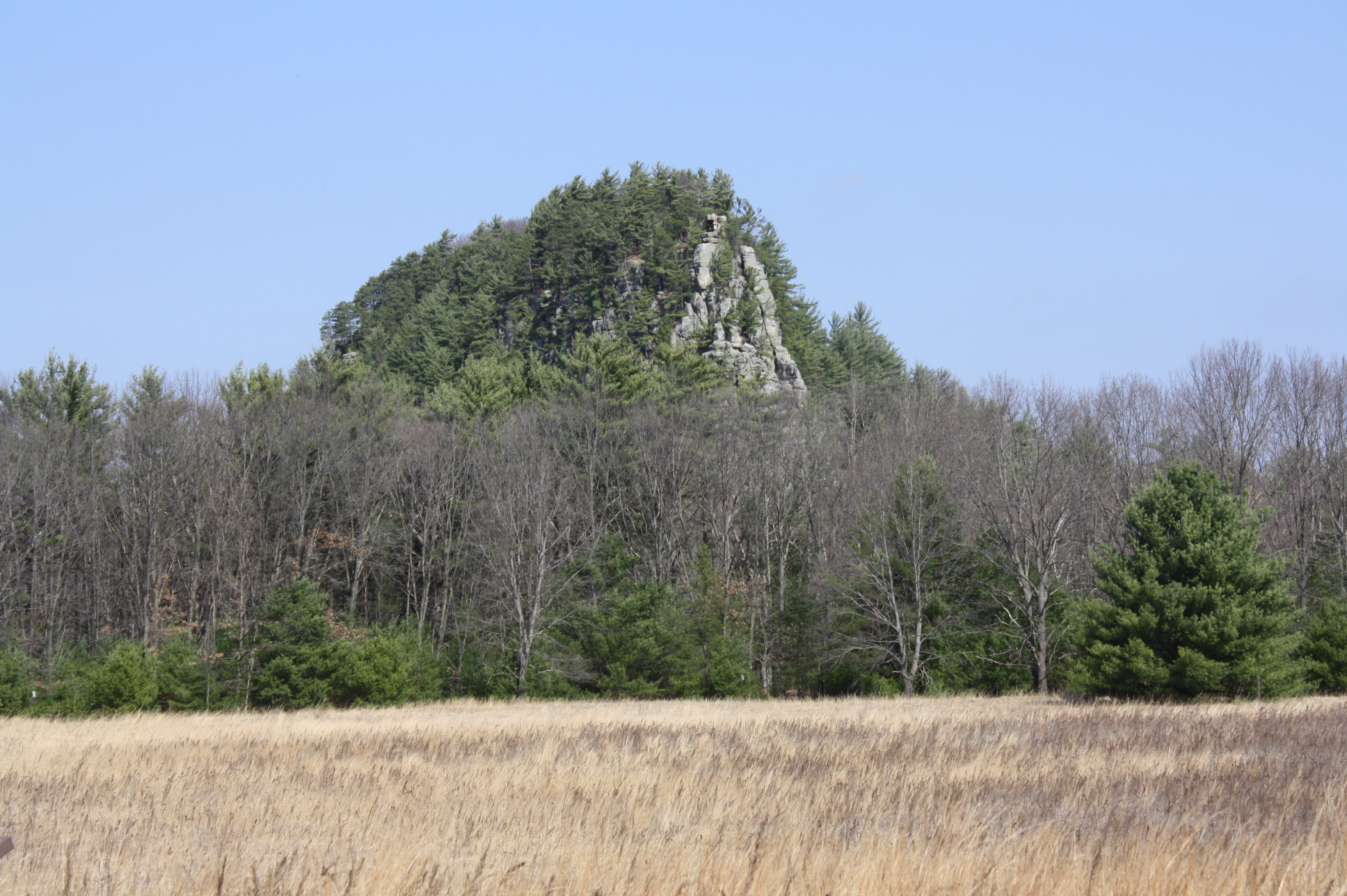
The park from the south
