= Roche-a-Cri Petroglyphs =

Historic place located near Friendship, Adams County, Wisconsin

- U.S. National Register of Historic Places
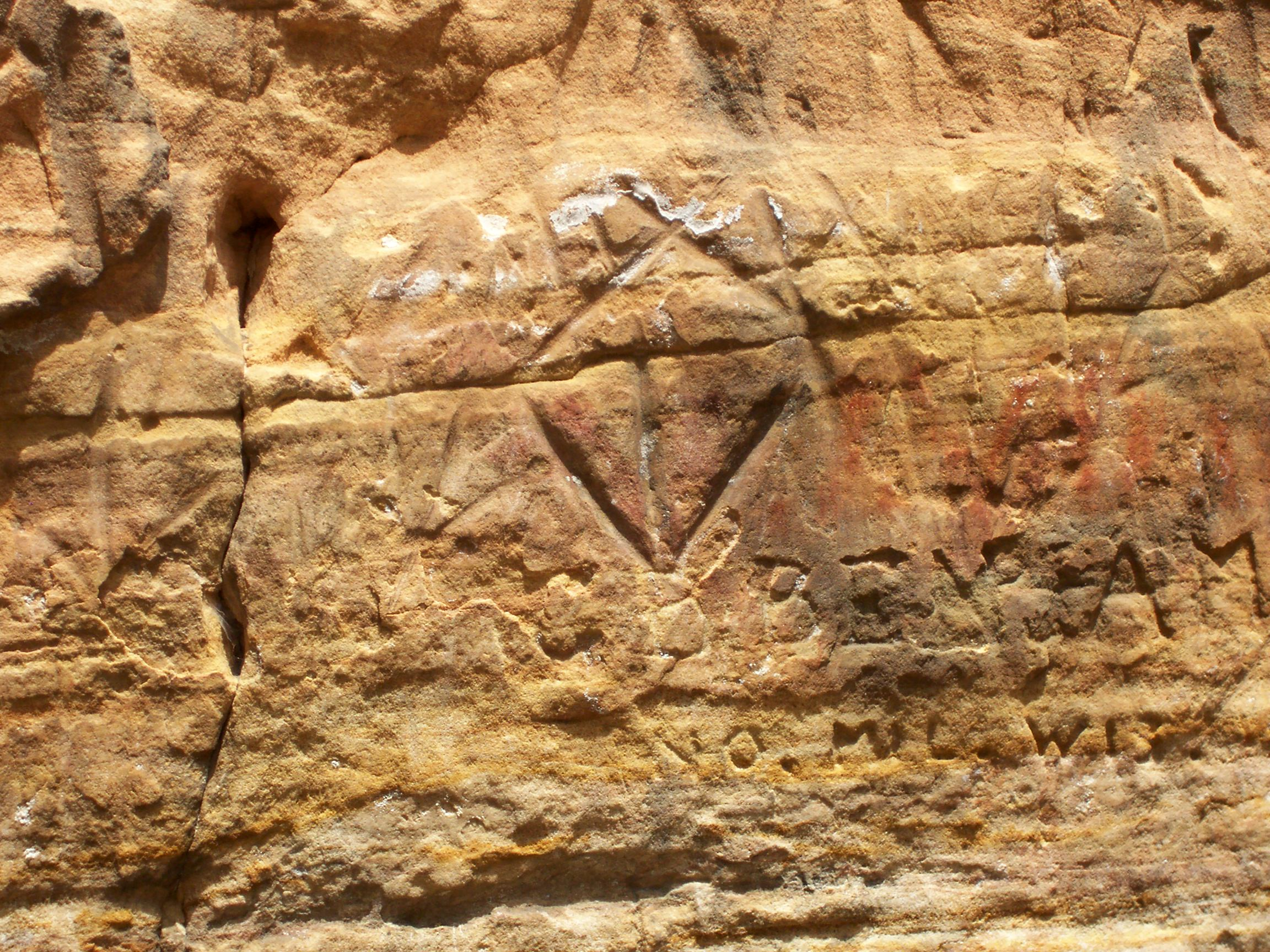
- Petroglyphs
- Location: Roche-a-Cri State Park, Adams County, Wisconsin, USA
- Coordinates: 44°00′06″N 89°49′04″W
- NRHP reference No.: 81000031
- Added to NRHP: May 11, 1981

The Roche-a-Cri Petroglyphs, also known as the Friendship Glyphs, are a Registered Historic Place in Roche-a-Cri State Park, near Friendship, Adams County, Wisconsin. They consist of Oneota rock art, mostly petroglyphs resembling birds, canoes and geometric designs. They were added to the National Register of Historic Places in 1981. The petroglyphs were vandalized by soldiers and area settlers between 1845 and the 1880s, notably Company D of the Wisconsin 1st Cavalry Sharpshooters in 1861.

== Gallery ==
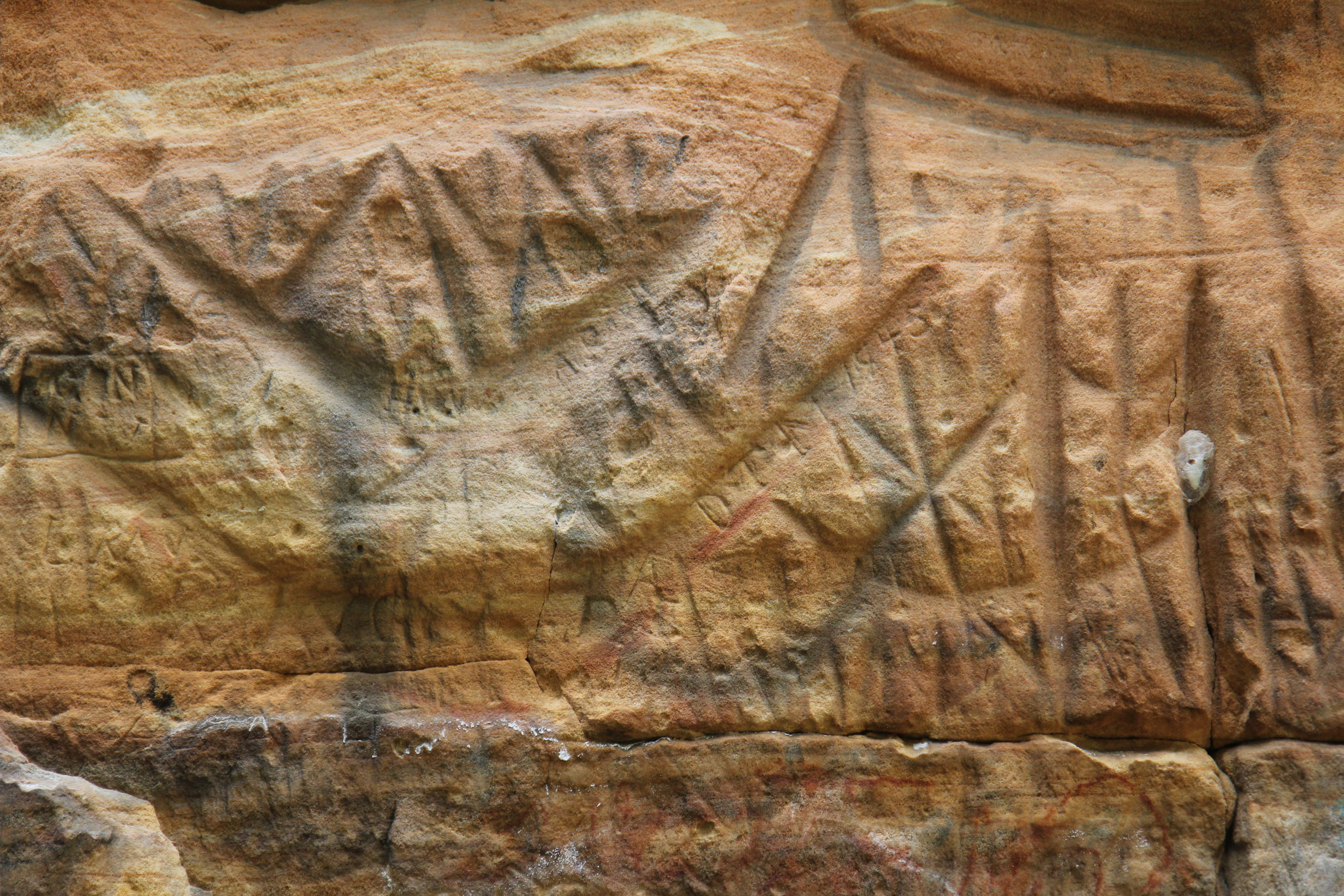
Part of the Roche A Cri Petroglyphs

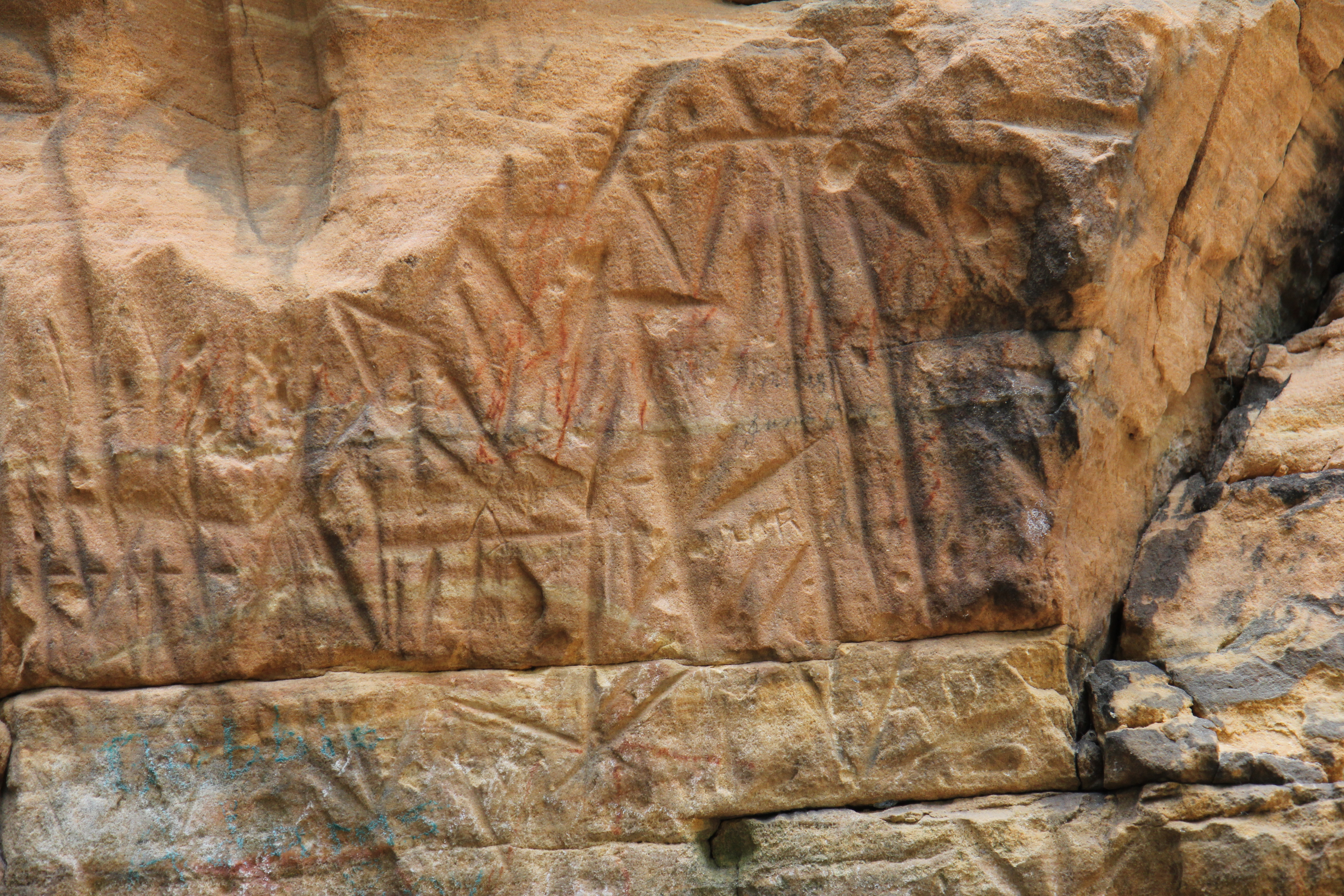
The Roche-A-Cri Petroglyphs. Vandalism from the 1800s are visible on the petroglyphs

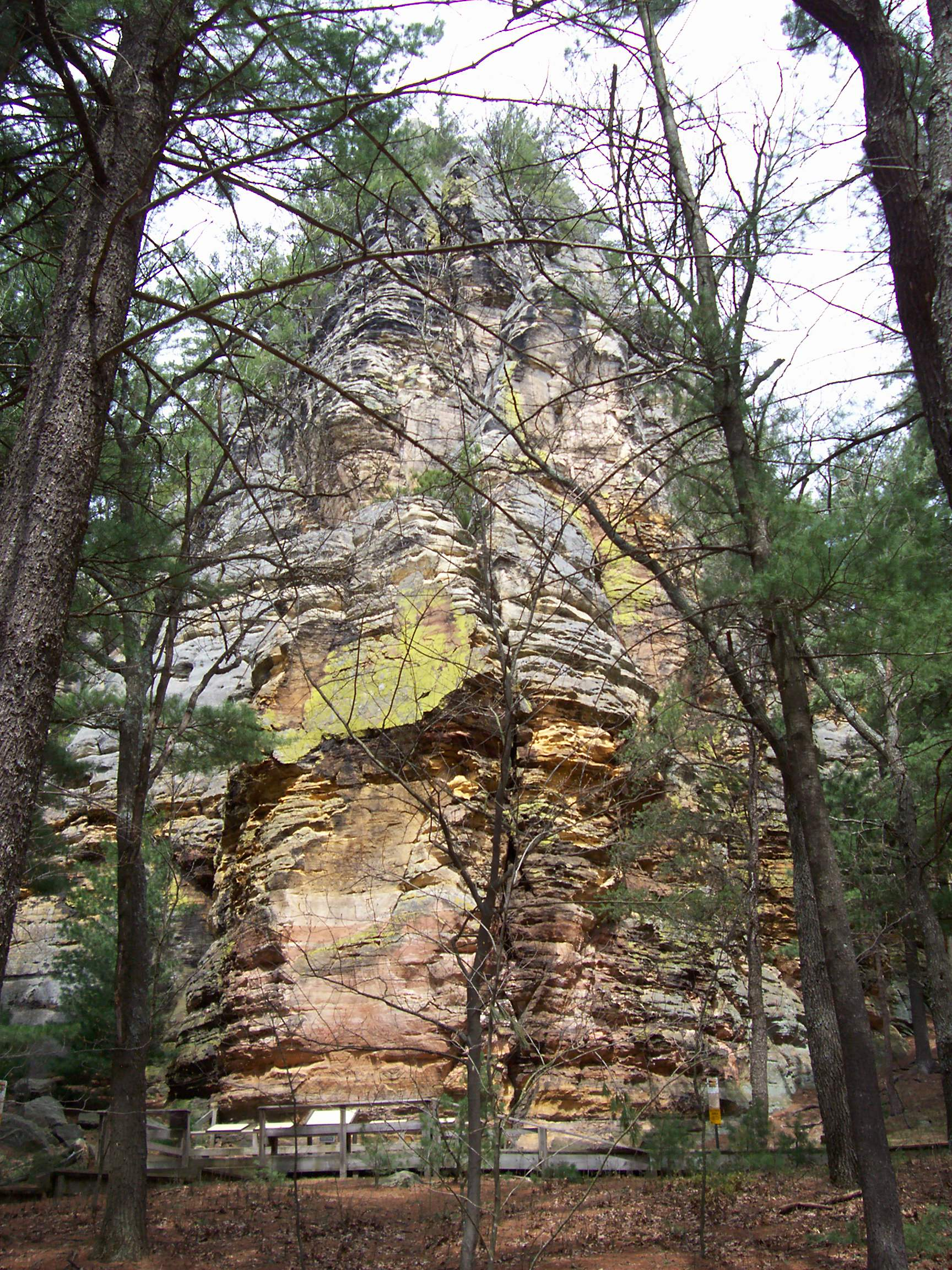
Outcropping rock

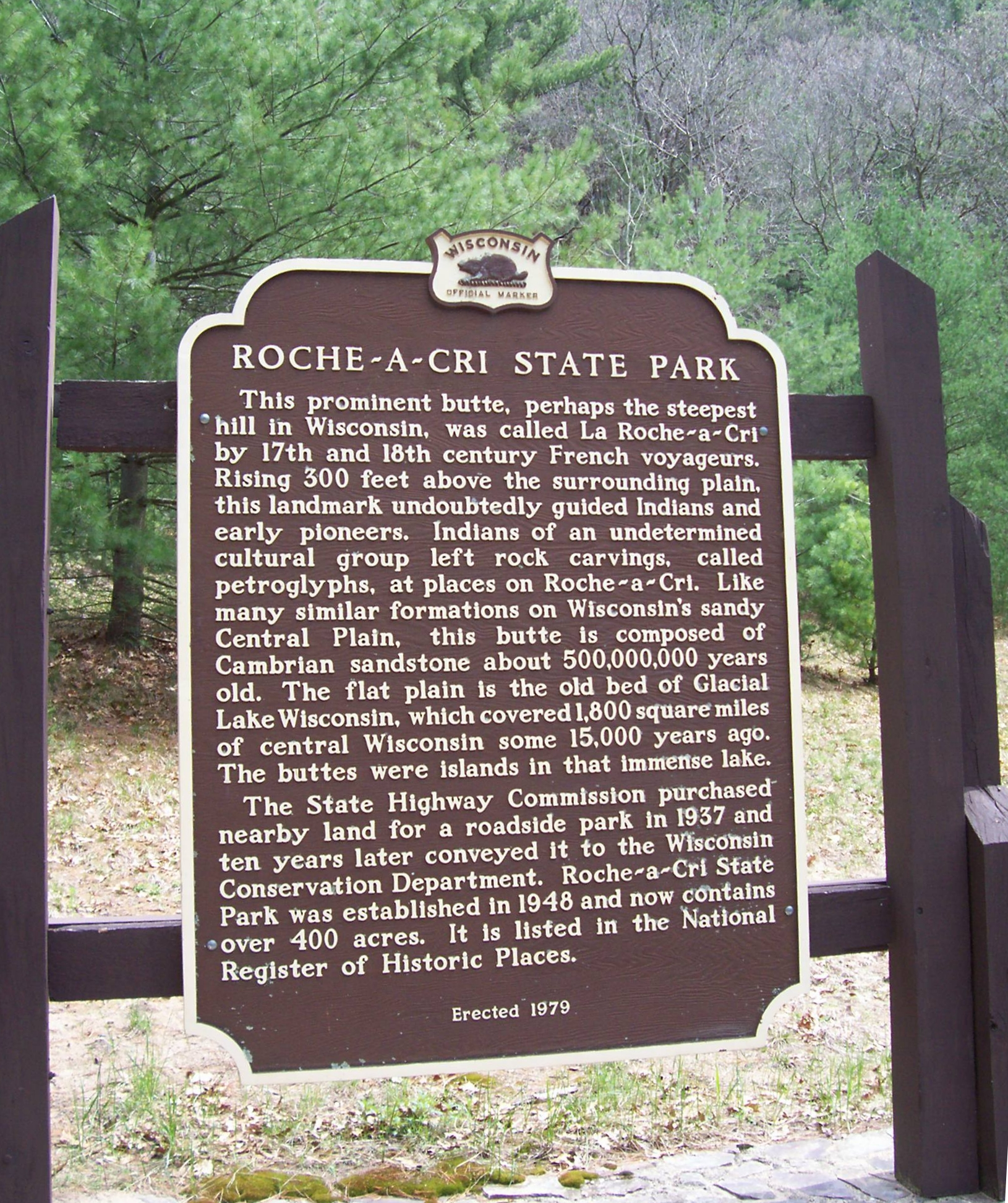
Sign
