= Scaup =

Scaup is the common name for three species of diving duck:

- Greater scaup, or just "scaup", Aythya marila
- Lesser scaup, Aythya affinis
- New Zealand scaup, Aythya novaeseelandiae
