= Ocooch Mountains =

Region in Wisconsin

Ocooch Mountains are a place name for the Western Upland area of Wisconsin also known as the Driftless Region, meaning un-glaciated, lacking glacial drift or the Paleozoic Plateau, referring to a geologic era, Greek for "ancient life".

== Geology ==
The lack of glaciated terrain accounts for high hills, bluffs, and ridges. The Chippewa, Black, La Crosse, Kickapoo, Baraboo, Lemonweir, Pine, Wisconsin, Grant, Platte and Pecatonia rivers and their tributaries create deeply eroded valleys that contrast the nearby peaks. One dramatic example is Wildcat Mountain State Park. The Baraboo Range anchors the eastern edge where the Wisconsin River turns and runs through the area to the Mississippi River. The Baraboo Range is a monadnock in Sauk and Columbia Counties and a National Natural Landmark formed 1.6 billion years ago featuring Devil's Lake, an endorheic lake.

== Naming ==
=== Edwin James ===
Its first use appears to have been in Edwin James' three-volume work, "An Account of an Expedition from Pittsburgh to the Rocky Mountains, Performed in the Years 1819, 1820... under the Command of Maj. S.H. Long" (London, 1823). James wrote, "The only hills worthy of particular notice, not only in this variety, but in the whole section under consideration, are the Ocooch and Smokey mountains, which are broad and elevated ridges rather than mountains. The former is situated about twelve miles north of the Wisconsin one hundred miles above its mouth..." He later says, "The third is a range of hilly and broken country, commencing on the Wisconsin near the Portage, and extending northwardly to Lake Superior. To this range we have taken the liberty to give the name of the Wisconsin Hills. The Ocooch and Smoke Mountains before mentioned, are connected with this range." James's description suggests that the term Ocooch was used only for the southernmost portion of the Wisconsin Western Uplands.

=== Stephen Long ===
Three years later, Maj. Stephen Long led a second expedition, this time into the upper Mississippi Valley. It was described in William Keating's "Narrative of an Expedition to the Source of St. Peter's River" (London, 1825). In volume two, page 214, Keating wrote of western Wisconsin, "To this region the name of the Wisconsin Hills has been given, which are terminated on the south by the Ocooch and Smoky Mountains, whose altitude is about twelve hundred feet above the common level, or two thousand feet above tide water. Its aspect is exceedingly diversified by hills and vallies, the former of which are high and rugged, supporting a heavy growth of pine, &c. while the latter often present extensive flats, abounding in lakes, swamps, and ponds, yielding wild rice in great abundance and perfection."

=== Keating and Hachures ===
Keating's report on the 1823 Long expedition included a "Map of the country embracing the route of the expedition of 1823 commanded by Major S.H. Long". The name Ocooch is placed on this map approximately where the Baraboo Hills are located.

Hachures extend the range to the north and northwest, but the implication is that the name Ocooch applied only to its southernmost end.

=== Baldwin and Craddock ===
An 1833 map, "Northwest and Michigan Territories" issued by Baldwin and Craddock for the Society for the Diffusion of Useful Knowledge also depicted the western highlands of Wisconsin. Unlike James and Keating, it placed the label Ocooch Mountains further north, at the headwaters of the Black, La Crosse, Kickapoo and Pine rivers. It showed the range running roughly north-northeast through modern La Crosse, Jackson, Clark and Taylor counties.

== Etymology ==
The vowels and consonants of Ocooch and their order are correct for the Ioway language, a Siouan language. The Ho Chunk, a related Native American tribe, called them a name phonetically similar to Ocooch, waxoj, pronounced WAH-KOH-CH(e). The Ioway-Otoe-Missouria emerged from the Oneota cultural group in western Wisconsin. Evidence of their presence is found throughout the Wisconsin Western Uplands as far north as Lake Pepin, and Red Wing, Minnesota, over to Effigy Mounds National Monument, the Upper Iowa River, and La Crosse, Wisconsin dated from AD 900 to 1700. Decimated by epidemics, the Ioway left the area after the Otoe-Missouria and as the Algonquin language-speaking Sauk, Meskwaki and Kickapoo peoples came from Michigan fleeing the Iroquois as a result of the French and Indian Wars, or Beaver Wars. Ocooch Mountains written in current Ioway tribal orthography "Paxochi Ahema'shi," pronounced as PAH-ko-chee ah-hay-MAH-shee” means "Mountains of Snowy Lodges." In addition, the phonetically similar Ho Chunk name for the Baraboo and Trempealeau rivers was Hoguc (Ho gooch), or Hocooch, "Spear Fishing Waters".

== See also ==
- Stephen H. Long's Expedition of 1820
