= Driftless Area =

Geological region in the Midwestern US

Coordinates: 43.5°N 91°W

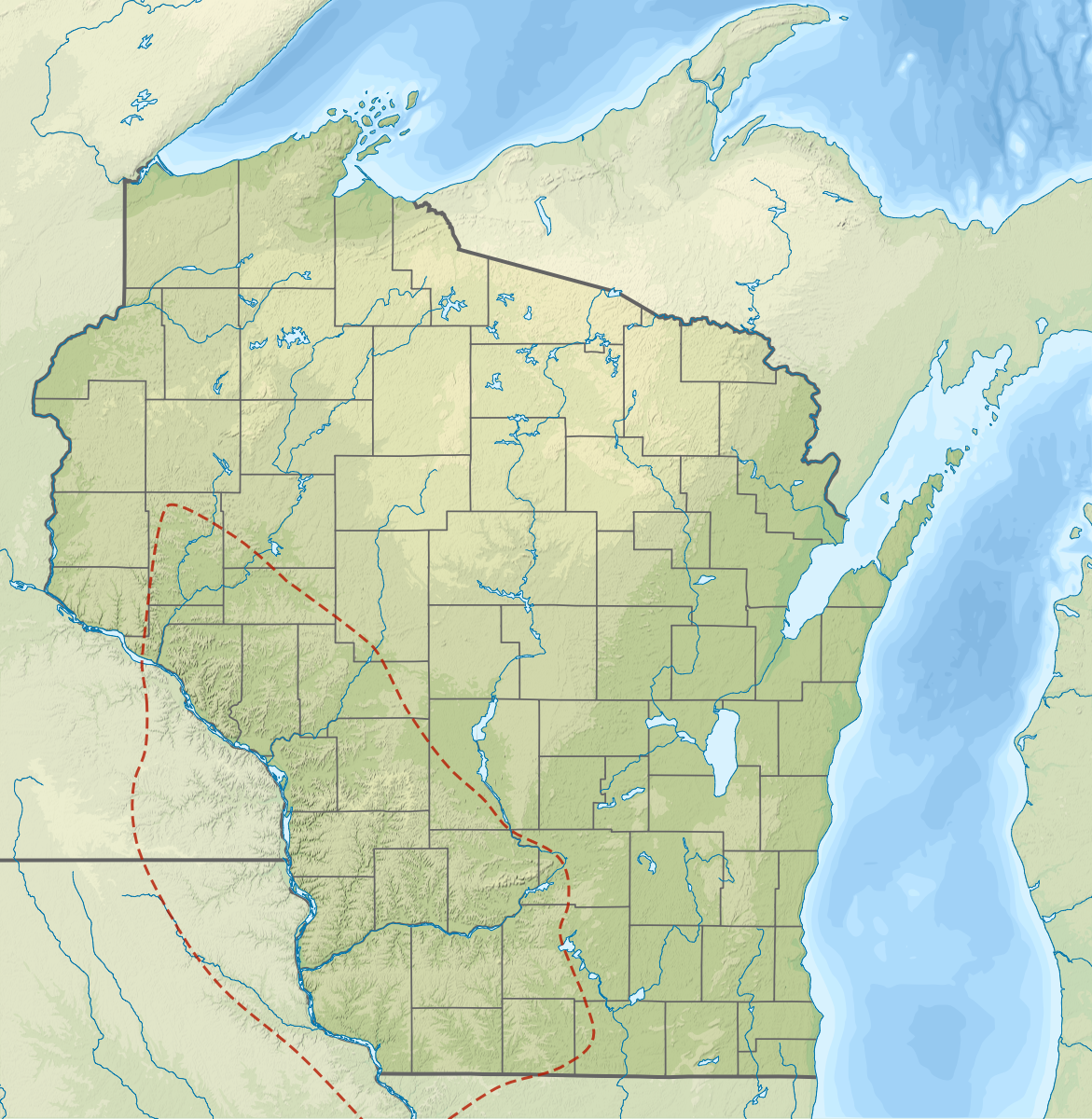
Driftless Region topographic map

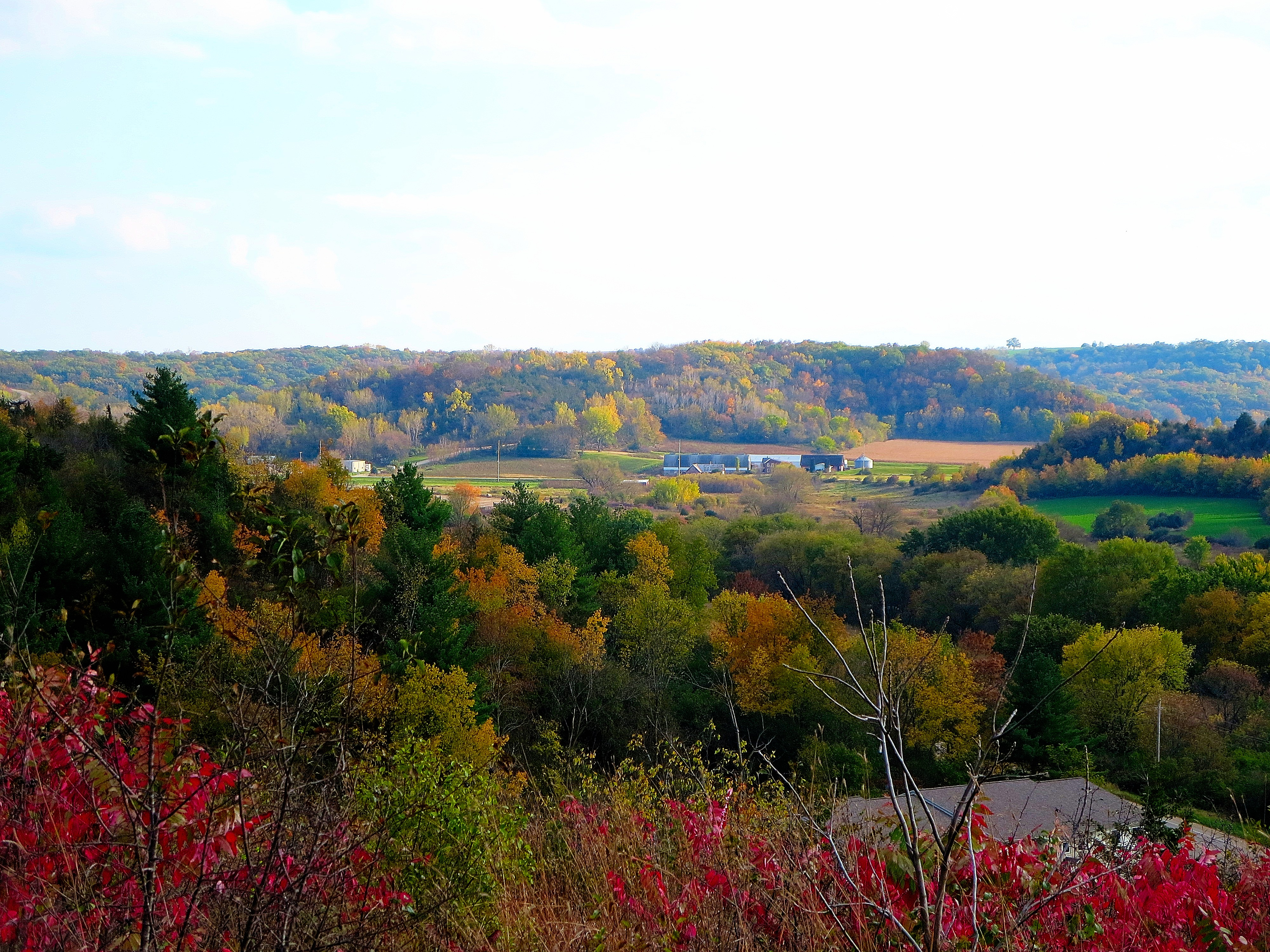
Autumn in the Driftless Area of Cross Plains, Wisconsin

The Driftless Area, also known as Bluff Country and the Paleozoic Plateau, is a topographic and cultural region in the Midwestern United States that comprises southwestern Wisconsin, southeastern Minnesota, northeastern Iowa, and the extreme northwestern corner of Illinois. The Driftless Area is a USDA Level III Ecoregion: Ecoregion 52. The Driftless Area takes up a large portion of the Upper Midwest forest–savanna transition. The eastern section of the Driftless Area in Minnesota is called the Blufflands, due to the steep bluffs and cliffs around the river valleys. The western half is known as the Rochester Plateau, which is flatter than the Blufflands. The Coulee Region is the southwestern part of the Driftless Area in Wisconsin. It is named for the lack of glacial drift in the area: the silt, gravel, and rock left behind by glaciers that can be found in other parts of Wisconsin.

The Driftless Area was never covered by ice during the Last Glacial Period, so the area lacks the characteristic glacial deposits known as drift. Its landscape is characterized by steep hills, forested ridges, deeply carved river valleys, and karst geology with spring-fed waterfalls and cold-water trout streams. Ecologically, the Driftless Area's flora and fauna are more closely related to those of the Great Lakes region and New England than those of the broader Midwest and central Plains regions. The steep riverine landscape of both the Driftless Area proper and the surrounding Driftless-like region is the result of early glacial advances that forced preglacial rivers, which flowed into the Great Lakes, southward, causing them to carve a gorge across bedrock cuestas, thereby forming the modern incised upper Mississippi River valley. The region has elevations ranging from 603 to 1,719 feet (184 to 524 m) at Blue Mound State Park, and together with the Driftless-like region, covers 24,000 square miles (62,200 km^{2}).

== Geologic origin ==
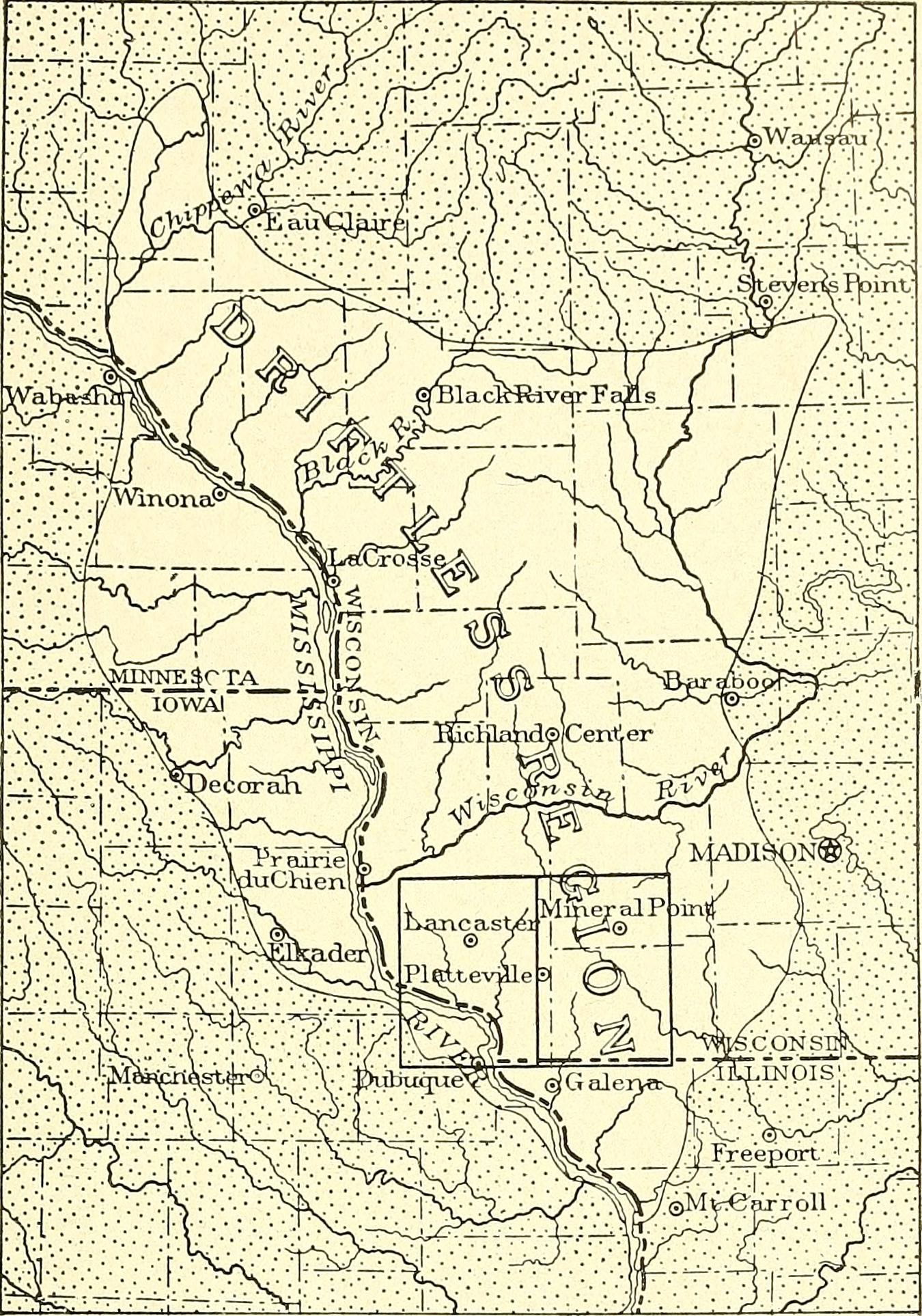
1911 map showing extent of the Driftless Area

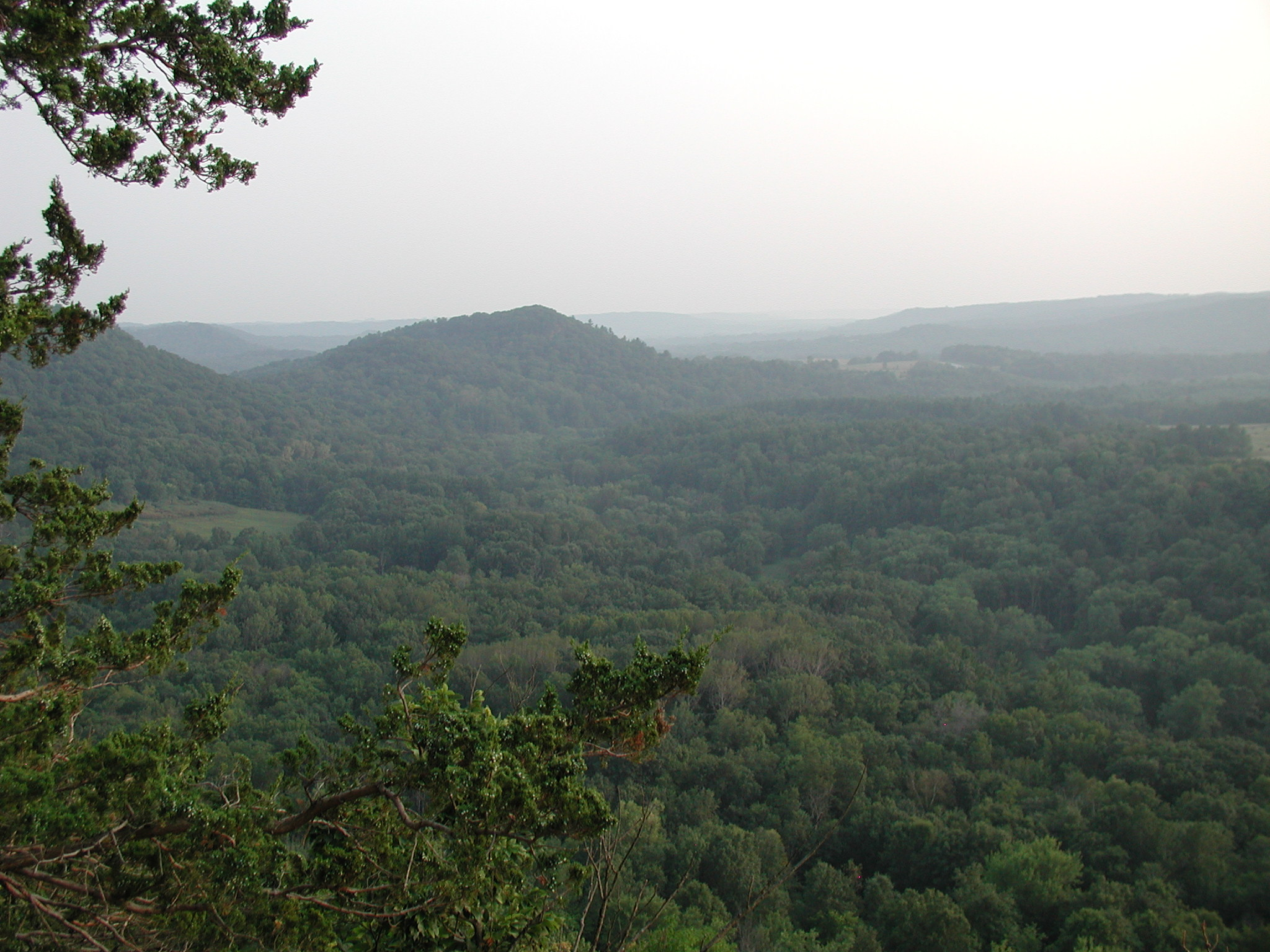
Typical terrain of the Driftless Area as viewed from Wildcat Mountain State Park in Vernon County, Wisconsin

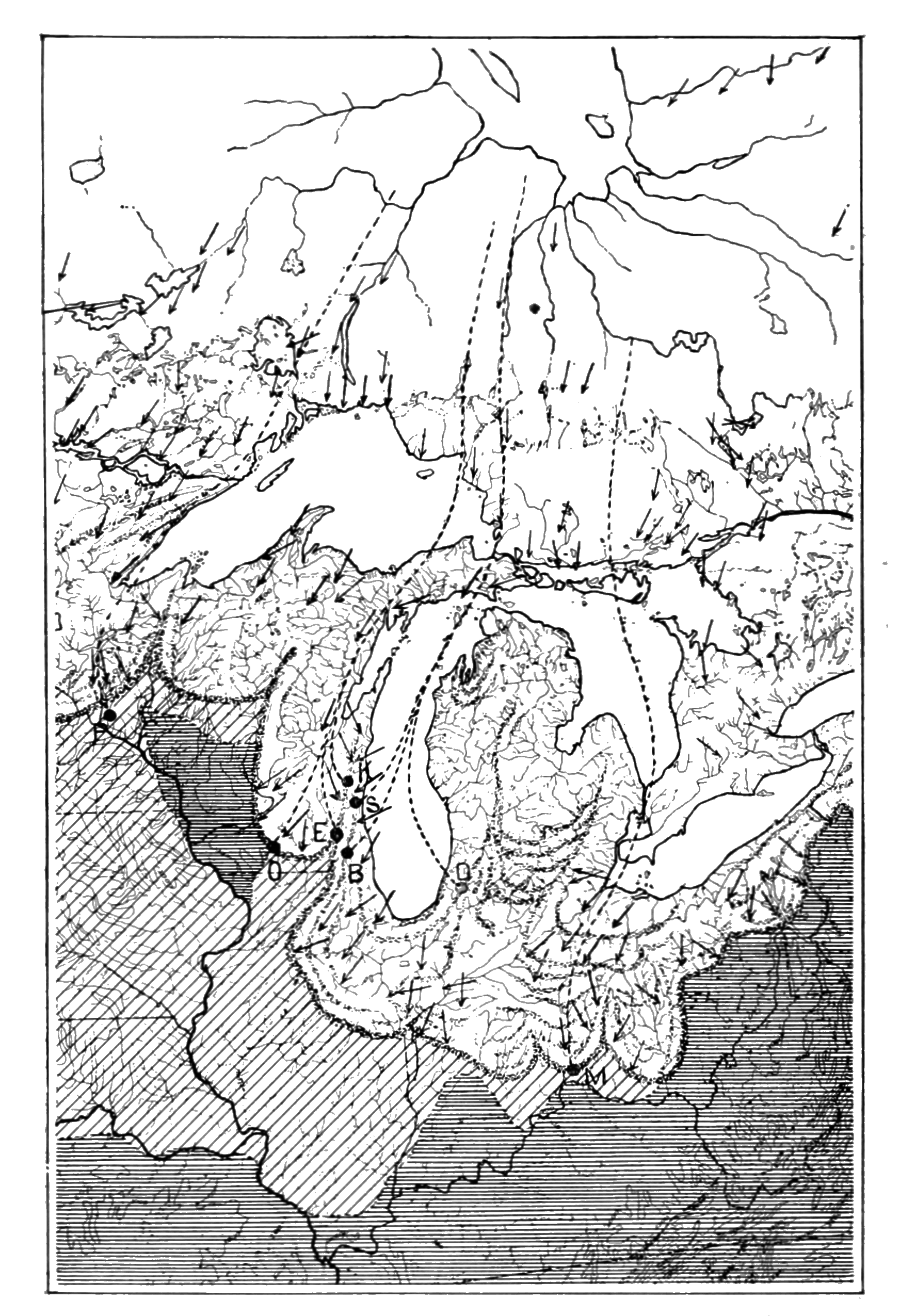
Glacial map of the Great Lakes region; the dark area near left center was not covered by drift. Areas with diagonal hatching were glaciated previously.

Retreating glaciers leave behind material called drift composed of silt, clay, sand, gravel, and boulders. Glacial drift includes unsorted material called till and layers deposited by meltwater streams called outwash. While drift from early (pre-Illinoian) glaciations has been found in some parts of the region, much of the incised Paleozoic Plateau of Wisconsin and northwestern Illinois has no evidence of glaciation. The Ice Age National Scenic Trail is famous for taking hikers along the southernmost point of the last ice age's glacial lobe, which does not include the present city of Milwaukee.

Numerous glacial advances throughout the world occurred during the most recent Quaternary glaciation (also known as the Pleistocene glaciation). The Upper Midwest and Great Lakes region of North America was repeatedly covered by advancing and retreating glaciers throughout this period. The Driftless Area escaped much of the scouring and depositional action by the continental glaciers that occurred during the Last Glacial Period, which produced significant differences in the topography and drainage patterns within the unglaciated area compared to adjacent glaciated regions.

The region has been subjected to large floods from the melting Laurentide ice sheet and subsequent catastrophic discharges from its proglacial lakes, such as Glacial Lake Wisconsin, Glacial Lake Agassiz, Glacial Lake Grantsburg, and Glacial Lake Duluth.

The last phases of the Wisconsin glaciation involved several major lobes of the Laurentide Ice Sheet: the Des Moines lobe, which flowed down toward Des Moines on the west; the Superior lobe and its sublobes on the north; and the Green Bay lobe and Lake Michigan lobes on the east. The northern and eastern lobes were in part diverted around the area by the Watersmeet Dome, an ancient uplifted area of Cambrian rock underlain by basalt in northern Wisconsin and western upper Michigan. The southward movement of the continental glacier was also hindered by the great depths of the Lake Superior basin and the adjacent highlands of the Bayfield Peninsula, Gogebic Range, Porcupine Mountains, Keweenaw Peninsula, and the Huron Mountains along the north rim of the Superior Upland bordering Lake Superior. The Green Bay and Lake Michigan lobes were also partially blocked by the bedrock of the Door Peninsula, which presently separates Green Bay from Lake Michigan.

Another factor that may have contributed to the lack of glaciation of the Driftless Area is the fractured, permeable bedrock within the Paleozoic Plateau underlying it, which would have promoted below-ground drainage of subglacial water that would otherwise have lubricated the underside of the glacial ice sheet. The dewatering of the underside of the ice sheet would have inhibited forward movement of the glacier into the Driftless Area, especially from the west.

In the adjacent glaciated regions, the glacial retreat left behind drift, which buried all earlier topographical features. Surface water was forced to carve out new stream beds. This process was absent in the Driftless Area, where the original drainage systems persisted during and after the Last Glacial Period. Water erosion continued carving the existing gullies, ravines, stream beds, and river valleys ever deeper into the paleozoic plateau, following the original drainage patterns.

== Characteristic landforms ==
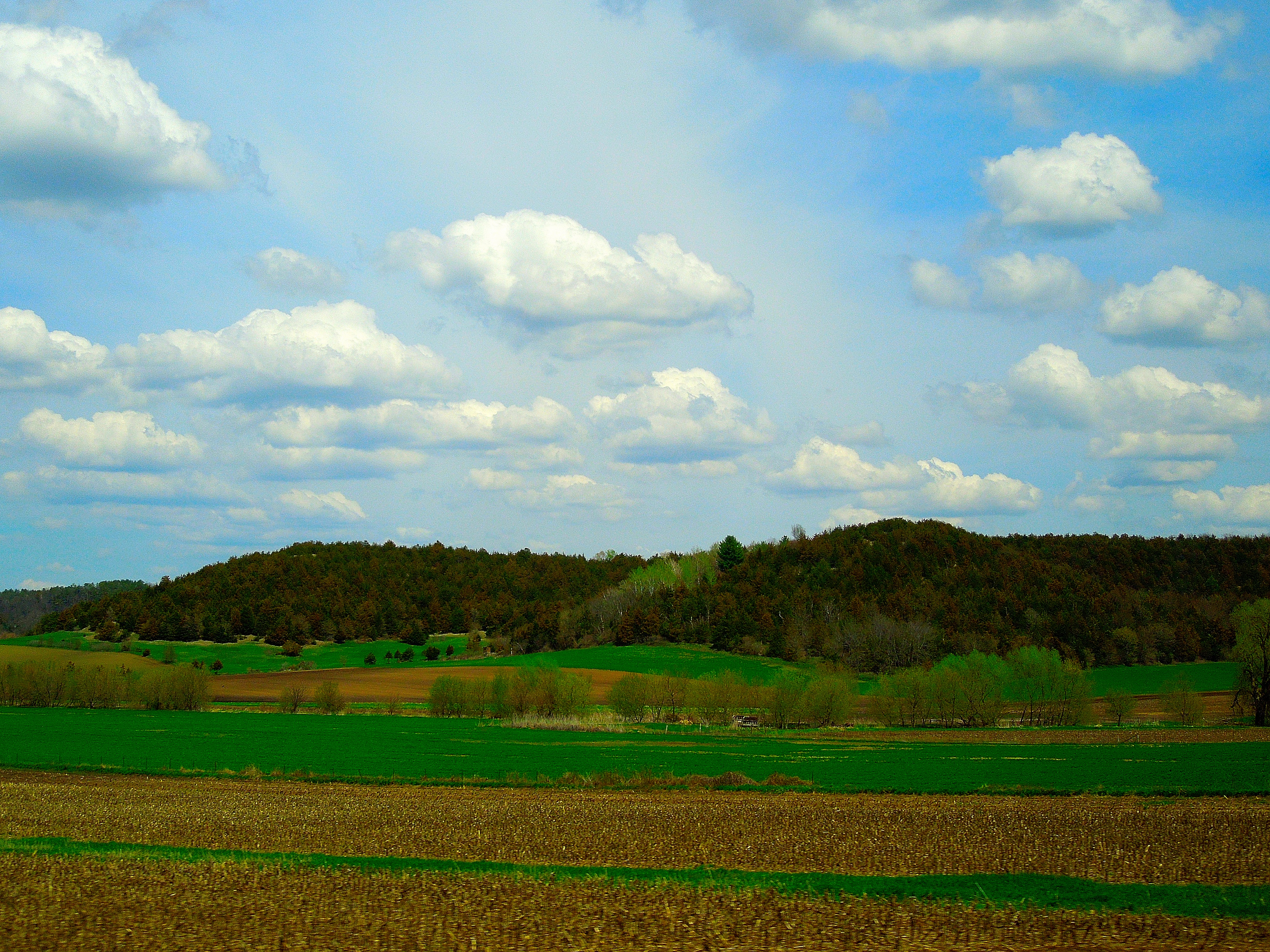
Typical Driftless Area scenery near Mazomanie, Wisconsin

=== Geology ===
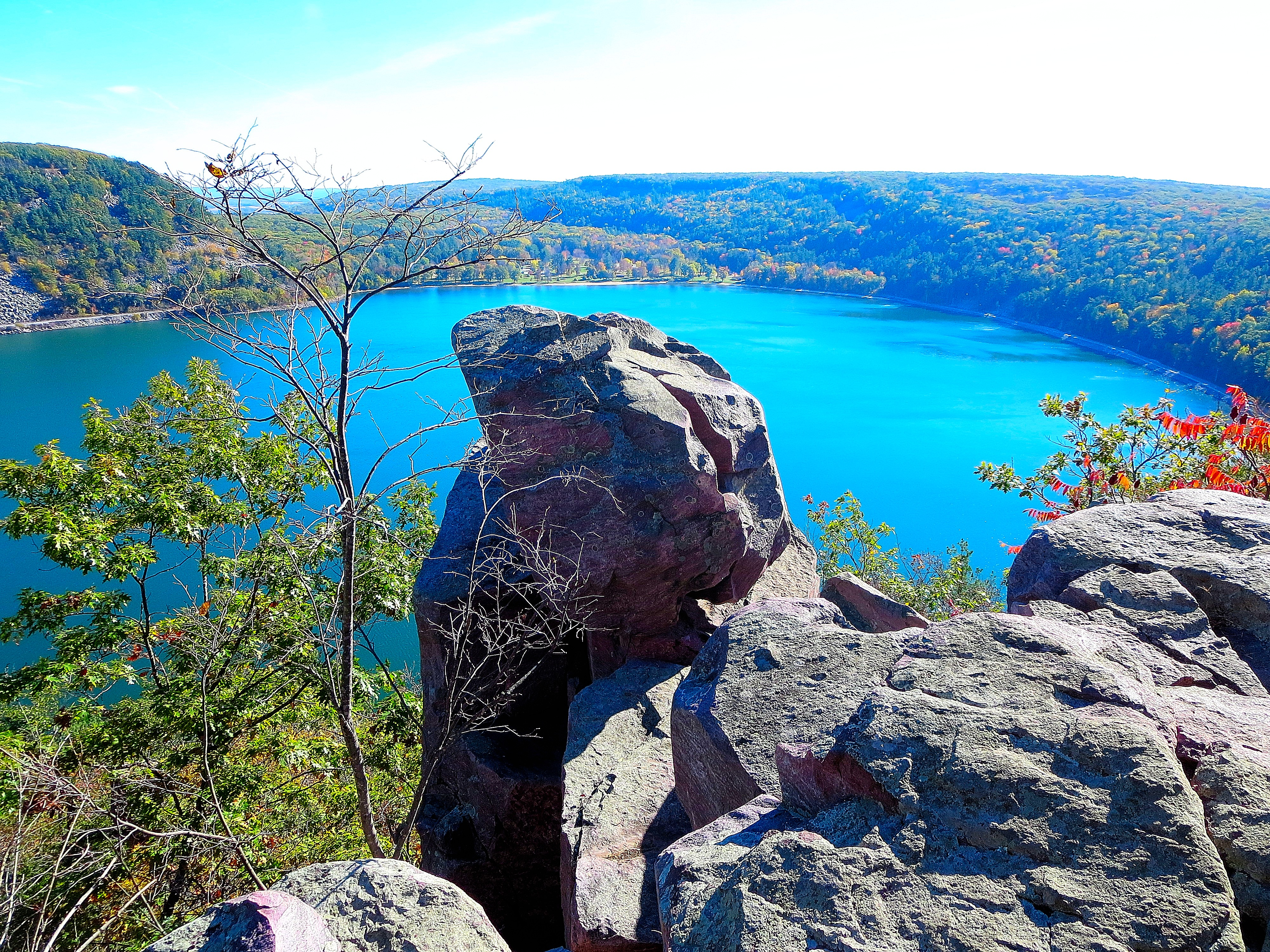
Tablet Rock Overlook in Wisconsin's Devils Lake State Park, located in the Baraboo Range

Overall, the region is characterized by an eroded plateau, with bedrock overlain by varying thicknesses of loess. Most characteristically, the branching river valleys are deeply dissected. The bluffs lining this reach of the Mississippi River climb to nearly 600 feet (180 m). In Minnesota, pre-Illinoian-age till was probably removed by natural means before the deposition of loess. The valley walls' sedimentary rocks date to the Paleozoic Era and are often covered with colluvium or loess. Bedrock, where not directly exposed, is very near the surface and is composed of "primarily Ordovician dolomite, limestone, and sandstone in Minnesota, with Cambrian sandstone, shale, and dolomite exposed along the valley walls of the Mississippi River." In the east, the Baraboo Range, an ancient, profoundly eroded monadnock in south central Wisconsin, consists primarily of Precambrian quartzite and rhyolite. The area has not undergone much tectonic action, as all the visible layers of sedimentary rock are approximately horizontal.

Karst topography is found throughout the Driftless area. This is characterized by caves and cave systems, disappearing streams, blind valleys, underground streams, sinkholes, springs, and cold streams. Disappearing streams occur where surface waters sink down into the earth through fractured bedrock or a sinkhole, either joining an aquifer, or becoming an underground stream. Blind valleys are formed by disappearing streams and lack an outlet to any other stream. Sinkholes result from the collapse of a cave's roof, and surface water can flow directly into them. Disappearing streams can re-emerge as large, cold springs. Cold streams with cold springs as their sources are superb trout habitat. Due to the rapid movement of underground water through regions with karst topography, groundwater contamination is a major concern in the Driftless area.

=== Rivers ===
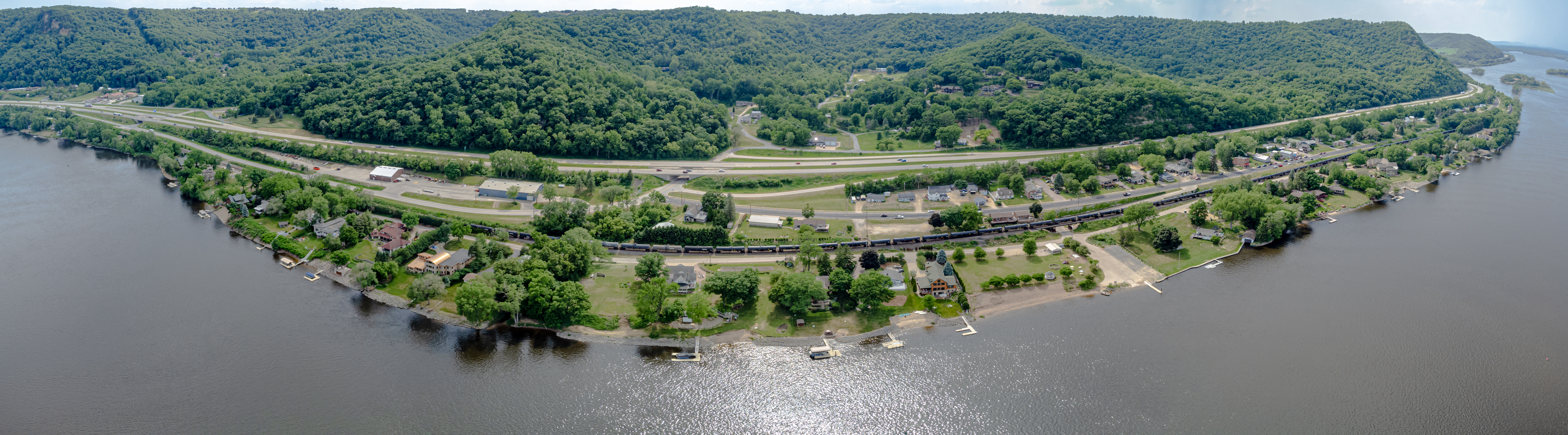
Dresbach, Minnesota on the Upper Mississippi River

The Mississippi River passes through the Driftless Area between and including Pool 2 and Pool 13.

As rivers and streams approach their confluence with the Mississippi, their canyons grow progressively steeper and deeper, particularly in the last 25 miles (40 km) in their journey to their mouths. The change in elevation above sea level from ridgetops lining a stream to its confluence with the main-stem Mississippi can reach well past 650 feet (200 m) in only a few miles. The Waukon Municipal Airport is reliably established as being 1,281 feet (390 m) above sea level. The Army Corps of Engineers maintains a river level in Pool 9 of about 619 feet (189 m) above sea level, which covers Lansing. Maps and signs issued by the Iowa Department of Transportation indicate Waukon and Lansing are 17 miles (27 km) apart on Iowa Highway 9. This is a drop of more than 660 feet (200 m) in less than 20 miles (32 km) (and this along a very minor tributary of the Mississippi). "The role of isostatic rebound on the process of stream incision in the area is not clearly understood."

There are many small towns in the Driftless Area, especially in river valleys, at or upstream from the Mississippi. Small towns in a deep steep valley going down to the Mississippi are at risk every 50 to 100 years or so of a major flood, as with the wreck of Gays Mills, Wisconsin, in August 2007, or the holding of the levee in Houston, Minnesota, (on the South Fork Root River) at the same time. Metropolitan areas have flood walls (See 2007 Midwest flooding). In August 2018, the region yet again experienced record-breaking flooding in valley towns such as Coon Valley, Wisconsin, La Farge, Wisconsin, and Viola, Wisconsin. The Kickapoo River flood stage is 13 feet but was recorded as high as 23 feet during the 2018 flood which was declared a statewide emergency. Many community members were rescued by boats sent by the Wisconsin Department of Natural Resources. Days later, when two dams in Ontario, Wisconsin broke, it produced flood water downstream in Readstown, Wisconsin, Soldiers Grove, Wisconsin, and Gays Mills, Wisconsin.

The history of this portion of the Upper Mississippi River dates back to an origin "as an ice-marginal stream during what had been referred to as the 'Nebraskan glaciation.'" This is an outdated and abandoned period in the Pre-Illinoian Stage. The level of erosion often exposes Cambrian limestone of about 510 million years of age. Evidence from soil borings and recent lidar imagery in the lower Wisconsin River valley in the Driftless area suggests that the river in the valley once flowed eastward, rather than its existing westerly course toward its confluence with the Mississippi River. This has led to the hypothesis that the ancient Upper Mississippi River (also named the Wyalusing River) at one time flowed east through the Wisconsin River valley and into the Great Lakes/Saint Laurence River system somewhere near the Door Peninsula. The hypothesis posits that the flow of the ancient Wyalusing River was ultimately captured by the ancestral Mississippi River to the south when that river eroded through the Military Ridge near Wyalusing State Park, possibly as a result of an ancient ice sheet in a previous continental glaciation blocking the Wyalusing River to the east. The resulting proglacial lake would have filled the Wyalusing River valley until it overtopped the Military Ridge, ultimately carving through the ridge and draining the lake. This resulted in the ancient Upper Mississippi River changing course and flowing south toward the Gulf of Mexico, instead of east into the Saint Lawrence River and the North Atlantic Ocean. The stream capture hypothesis for the Upper Mississippi River would have produced a substantial diversion of water from the Great Lakes Basin and the Saint Lawrence River, reducing the inflow of fresh water into the North Atlantic with possible impacts to ocean currents and climate.

The Mississippi River trench is one of the few places in the Driftless Area where the bedrock is very deep below the surface, and is overlaid by large amounts of sediment. As home to the formation of a substantial portion of the gorge of the Upper Mississippi, this enormous quantity of sediment goes down at least 300 feet (91 m) under the present riverbottom at the confluence of the Wisconsin River. In contrast, as the Mississippi exits the Driftless Area "between Fulton and Muscatine, [... (Pool 13)], it flows over or near bedrock." "The course of the upper Mississippi River along the margin of the Driftless Area of southeastern Minnesota is believed to have been established during pre-Wisconsin time, when a glacial advance from the west displaced the river eastward from central Iowa to its present position."

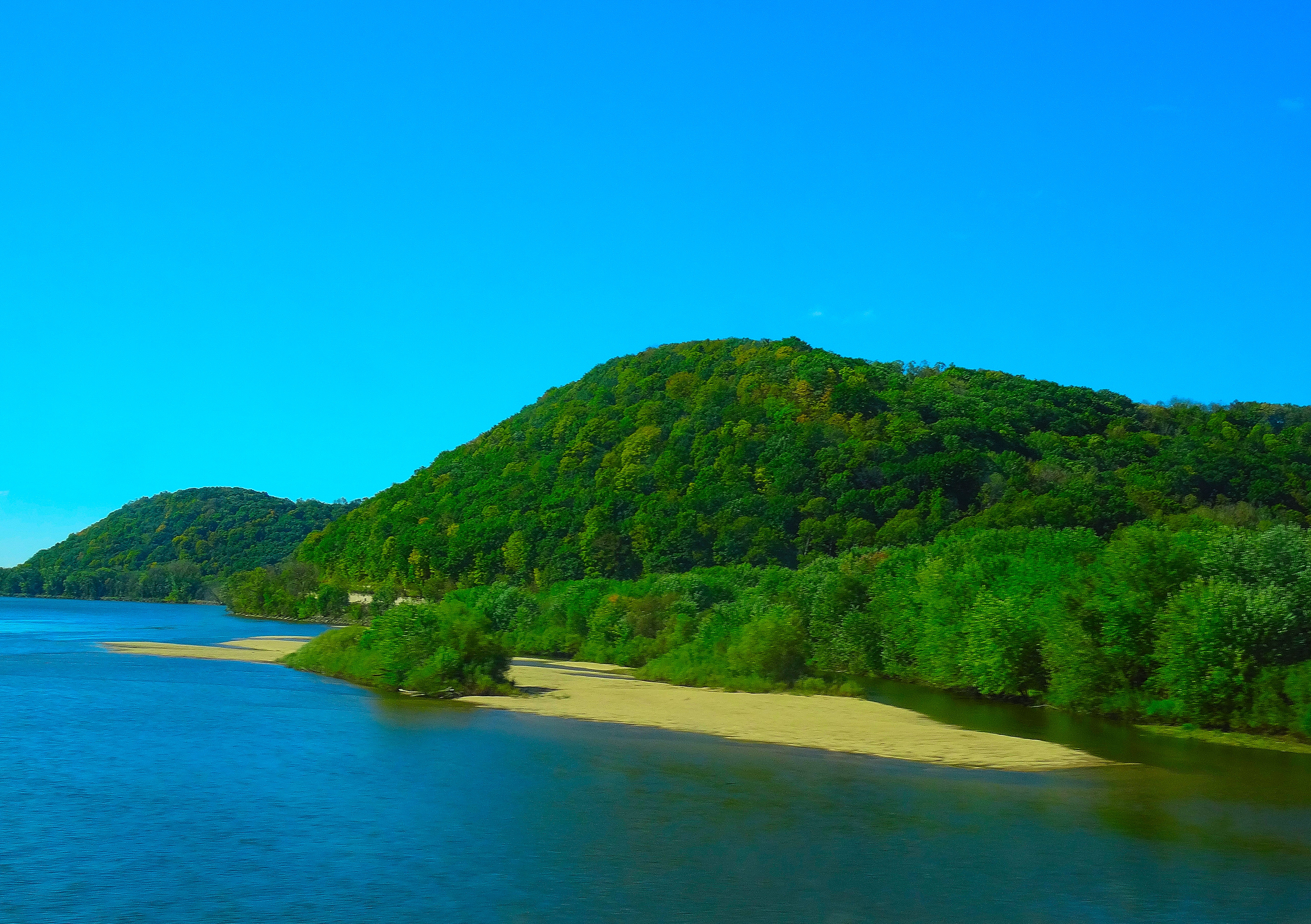
Wisconsin River near Marietta, Wisconsin

Other rivers affected by this geologic process are:

- In Wisconsin, the Chippewa, Trempealeau, La Crosse, Black, Baraboo, Pecatonica, Eau Claire, and Wisconsin Rivers, along with the Wisconsin River's tributary, the Kickapoo River
- In Minnesota: the Whitewater, Cannon, Zumbro, and Root rivers
- In Iowa: the Upper Iowa (and Paint Creek), Yellow, Turkey, and Maquoketa rivers
- In Illinois: the Apple River and the Galena River (a.k.a. the Fever River)

Although lying just to the north of the Driftless Area, the Saint Croix in Wisconsin and Minnesota is another important river that affected the area, as it was the outlet for Glacial Lake Duluth, forerunner to Lake Superior, when the eastern outlet was blocked by the continental ice sheet. All major rivers in and adjacent to the Driftless Area have deep, dramatic canyons giving testimony to the immense quantity of water which once surged through them as a result of the nearby melting glaciers associated with the miles-high ice sheets during recurring ice ages. Other examples include the Wisconsin River, which drained Glacial Lake Wisconsin, and Glacial River Warren (whose bed is occupied by the Minnesota River), which drained the colossal Glacial Lake Agassiz. There was ample water to dig a very deep, hundreds-of-miles-long gash into the North American bedrock where the Upper Mississippi River now flows.

=== Ecosystem ===
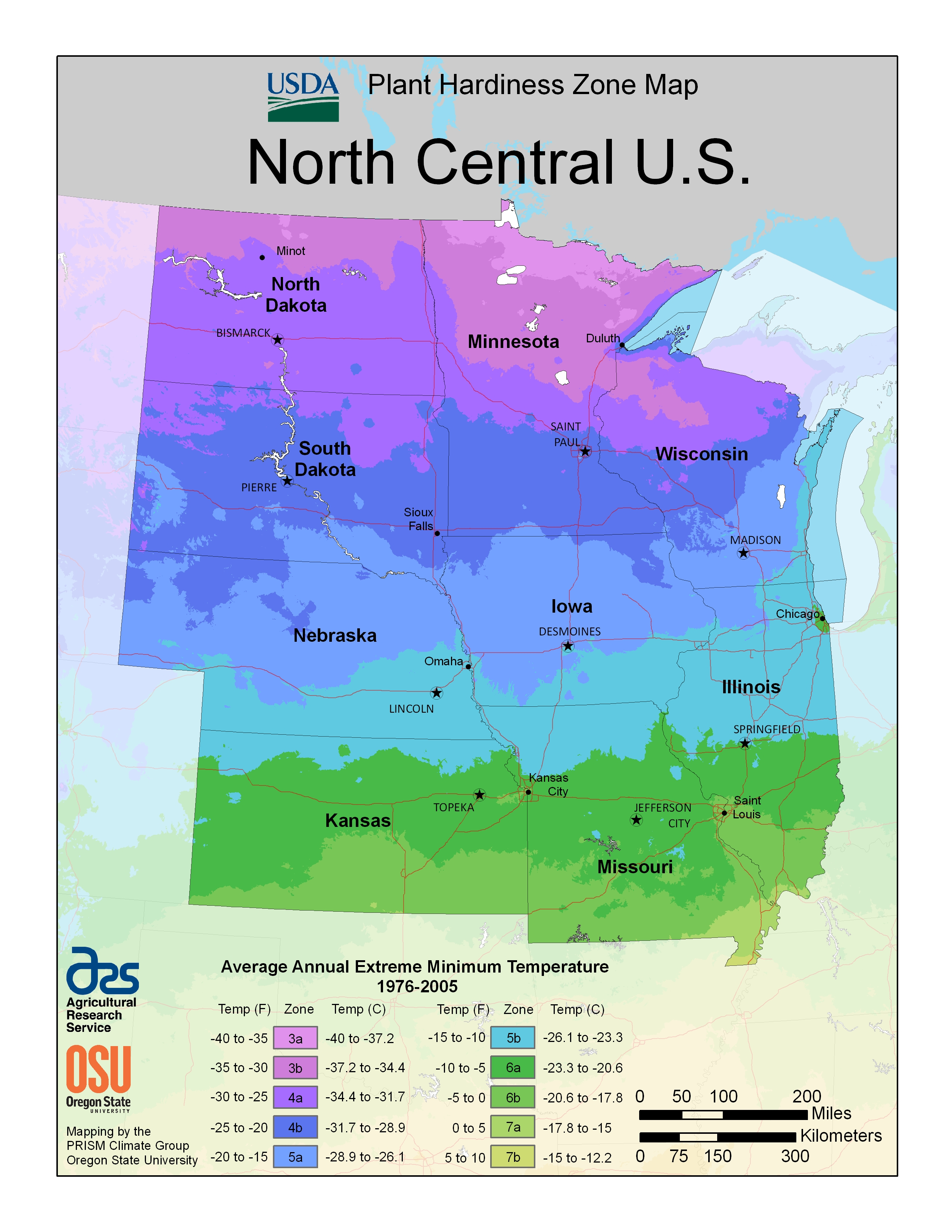
USDA plant hardiness zone regional map - North Central US

The climate is humid continental, displaying both the cool summer and warm summer subtypes as one travels from north to south. The United States Department of Agriculture has the region falling mainly in zone 5a, with the northern fringe being 4b. A few patches in Wisconsin are 4a.

Before European settlement in the 19th century, the vegetation consisted of tallgrass prairie and bur oak savanna on ridgetops and dry upper slopes, sugar maple-basswood-oak forest on moister slopes, sugar maple-basswood forests in protected valleys and on north-facing slopes, wet prairies along the rivers, and some mesic prairie on the floodplain farther back from the river. There were probably also oak forests that contained no sugar maple. Marsh and floodplain forests were also common on river flood plains. Prairie was restricted primarily to the broader ridgetops, which were unfavorable sites for trees due to thin soils and shallow bedrock, rapid drainage, and desiccating winds; all these conditions were also good for carrying fires across the landscape. Prairies also occurred on steep slopes with south or southwest aspect (see goat prairie). Natural fire, which has long been vigorously suppressed, was essential for the regeneration of such prairies.

Evidence of ancient extinct ice age animals that once inhabited the Driftless Area has been discovered over the years. An example of extinct Pleistocene megafauna in the area is the Boaz mastodon, a composite skeleton of two separate mastodons found in the 1890s in southwestern Wisconsin. Although evidence exists that mastodons inhabited mostly coniferous spruce forests associated with the taiga biome, it is likely that most or all of the Driftless Area was at times covered by tundra and permafrost during periods of glacial maximums.

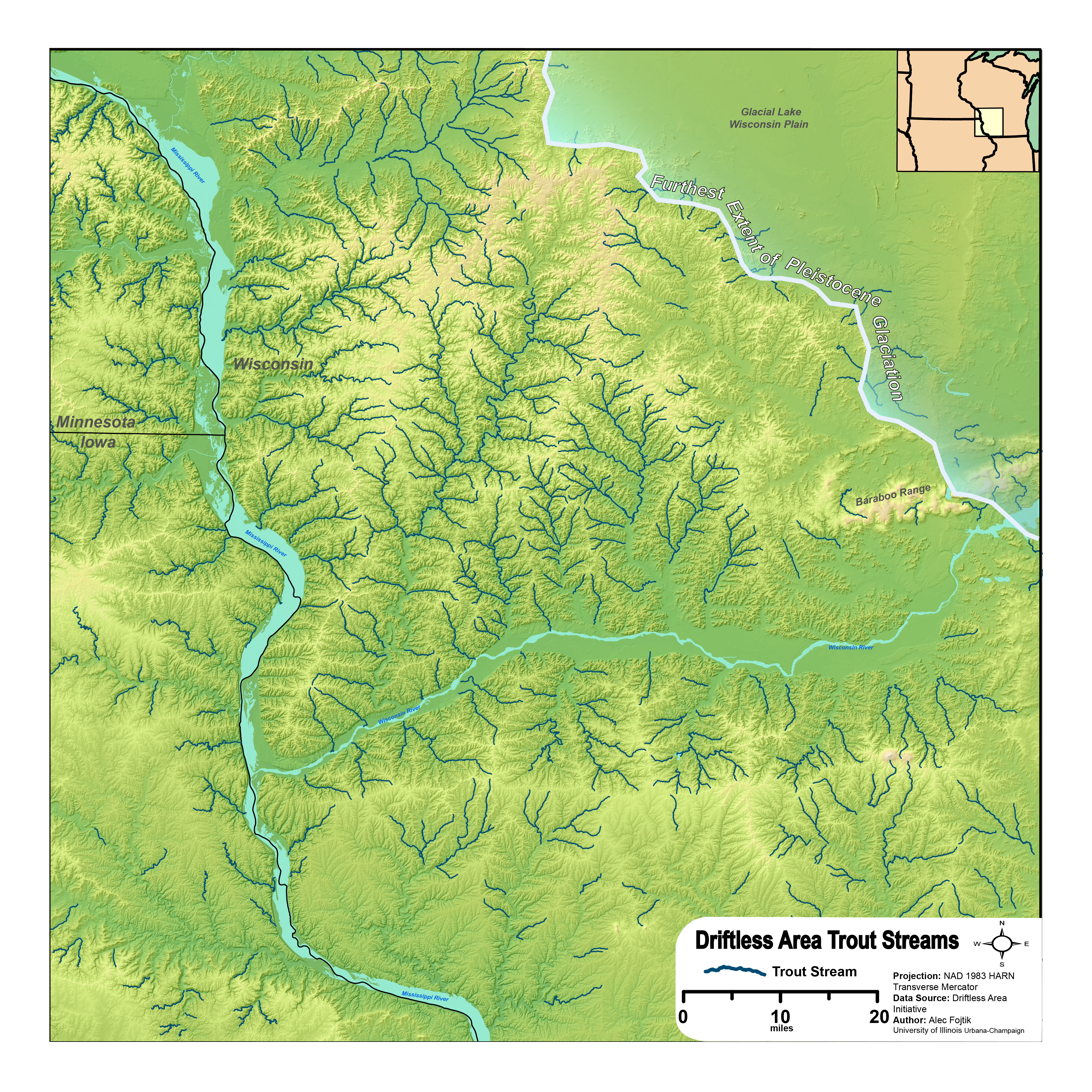
Relief map of the central Driftless Area, emphasizing the high density of trout waters in the region

The Midwest Driftless Area Restoration Effort is a multi-agency cooperative effort to restore the landscape. The main issues are erosion and water pollution from agricultural and animal runoff. Many farmers in the region use contour plowing, strip cropping, and other agricultural practices to reduce soil erosion due to the hilly terrain. Water pollution is critical in karsted regions such as this because it can degrade or destroy prime cold-water fish habitat. Soil erosion presents the Army Corps of Engineers with a problem that requires it to dredge the Mississippi River shipping channels to keep them open. Trout Unlimited is part of this effort, if only because of the superb cold-water streams the region supports. A symposium was held in 2007 in Decorah, Iowa, "to share the results of research, management and monitoring work in the Driftless Area." The Nature Conservancy is also interested.

Iowa Pleistocene snail

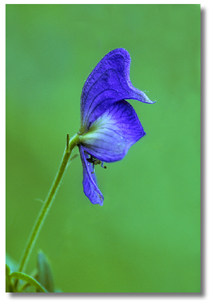
Northern monkshood

The Driftless Area contains more than half of the world's algific talus slopes, a type of small, isolated ecosystem. These refugia create cool summer and fall microclimates that host species usually found further north. They contain at least one endangered species, the Iowa Pleistocene Snail, and a threatened plant, the Northern monkshood. The Driftless Area National Wildlife Refuge was primarily carved out of the Upper Mississippi River National Wildlife and Fish Refuge to protect these species and their associated ecosystems.

Isolated relic stands of pines and associated northern vegetation are found in some locations where algific talus slopes exist. These trees survive in the cooler microclimate at these locations outside of their range further north.

A noteworthy annual event is the rising of mayflies in the region. These are aquatic insects attracted to light which rise by the millions as adults to mate.

Wildlife is abundant with opportunities for hunting whitetail deer and wild turkey. Fishing, particularly for brown trout, brook trout, and rainbow trout in tributaries, and species such as channel catfish in the Mississippi is available, with ice fishing in winter.

=== Other characteristics ===
The Driftless Area is part of the Mississippi Flyway. Many birds fly over the river in large flocks, going north in spring and south in autumn. Bald eagles also frequent the skies high above the banks of the Mississippi.

There are very few natural lakes in the region. They are in adjoining areas of glacial till, drift, and in moraines; the region is extraordinarily well drained, and there is rarely a place where even a pond can naturally form. There are also very few dams because the valley walls and floors are very often fissured or crumbly, or very porous, providing poor anchors for a dam and making it difficult to keep any kind of reservoir appropriately filled. There are no real waterfalls, but some very strong springs bear the name.

A modern, man-made characteristic is the comparatively twisty nature of highways in the region, as in Kentucky, in contrast to the usually rigid east-west/north-south alignment elsewhere in the Midwest. Here, the roads switchback up stream valleys or travel over ridge tops. U.S. Highway 20 through the Driftless, and particularly in Illinois, is a good example.

== Economy ==
=== Agriculture ===
The Driftless Area provides good conditions for growing crops and grazing livestock. In recent years, the region has generated much public interest in the organic and artisanal food market.

Organic dairy and beef production is of particular economic significance to the Driftless. Organic Valley, the largest organic dairy cooperative in the U.S., was founded and is headquartered in La Farge, Wisconsin. The region's cheese production boasts specialty cheeses such as raw-milk artisan cheese made from unpasteurized milk. Organic dairy generally fits best with a grass-based milk production system.

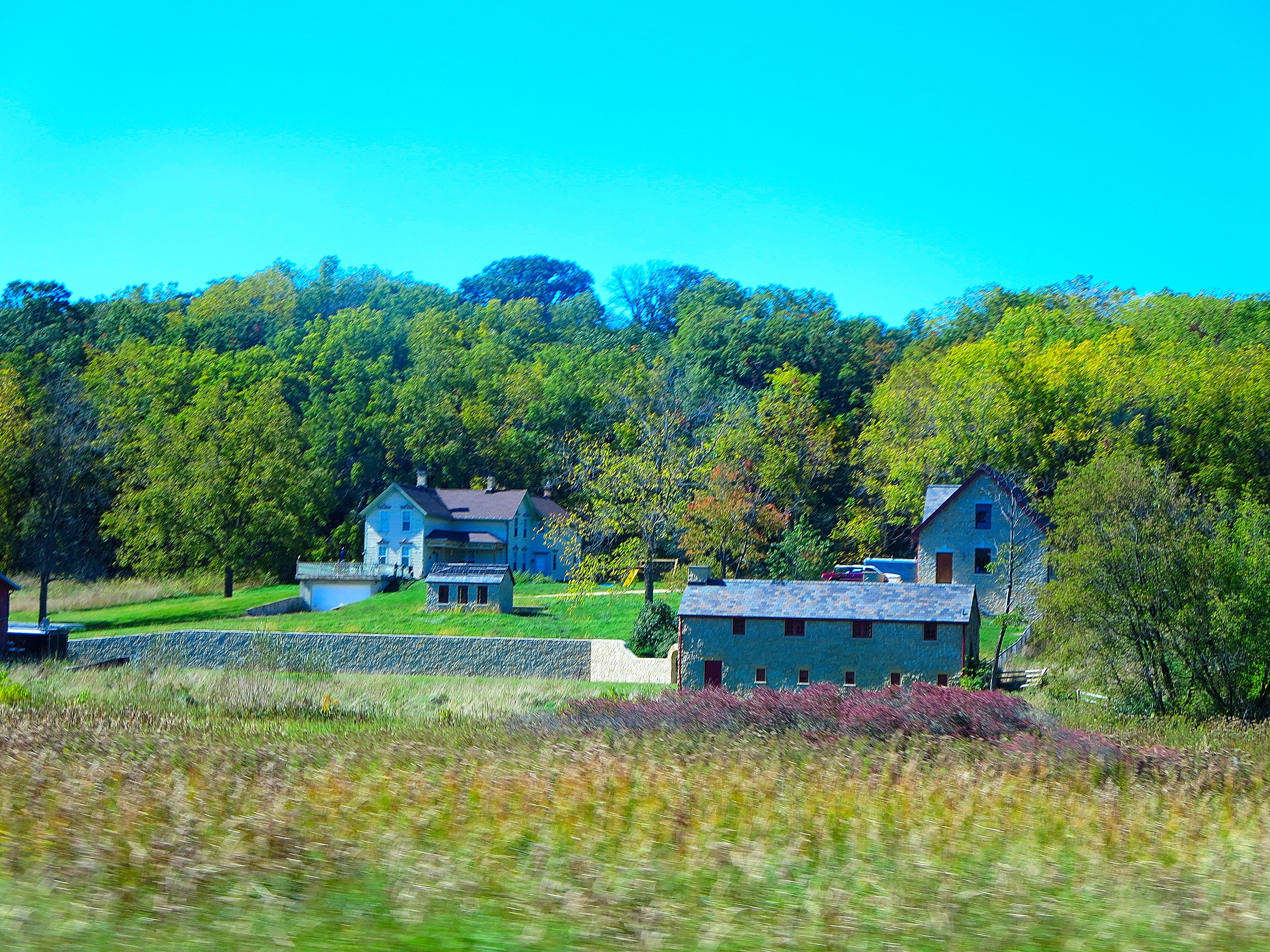
Primrose Winery, in New Glarus, Wisconsin

The bioregion's economic and cultural characteristics were federally recognized with the granting of the Upper Mississippi River Valley (UMRV) viticultural area, the largest designated winemaking region in the country, by the Treasury Division's Tax and Trade Bureau in 2009. The petition for designation maintains that the region is a cohesive whole for marketing wine, and is also used to market other products.

In addition to wine-grape production and wine-making, the region, especially in southeast Minnesota, is known for apple, maple syrup, and honey production. Tobacco was once a key crop of the Driftless, which has suitable topography and sandy, nutrient-rich soil.

The Driftless Region Food and Farm Project, in partnership with the University of Wisconsin-Madison Center for Integrated Agricultural Systems, is a coalition of sustainable-agriculture farmers, processors, distributors, chefs, planning commissions, and other participants. The project seeks to define the culinary identity of the region and further direct the development of agritourism.

=== Mining ===
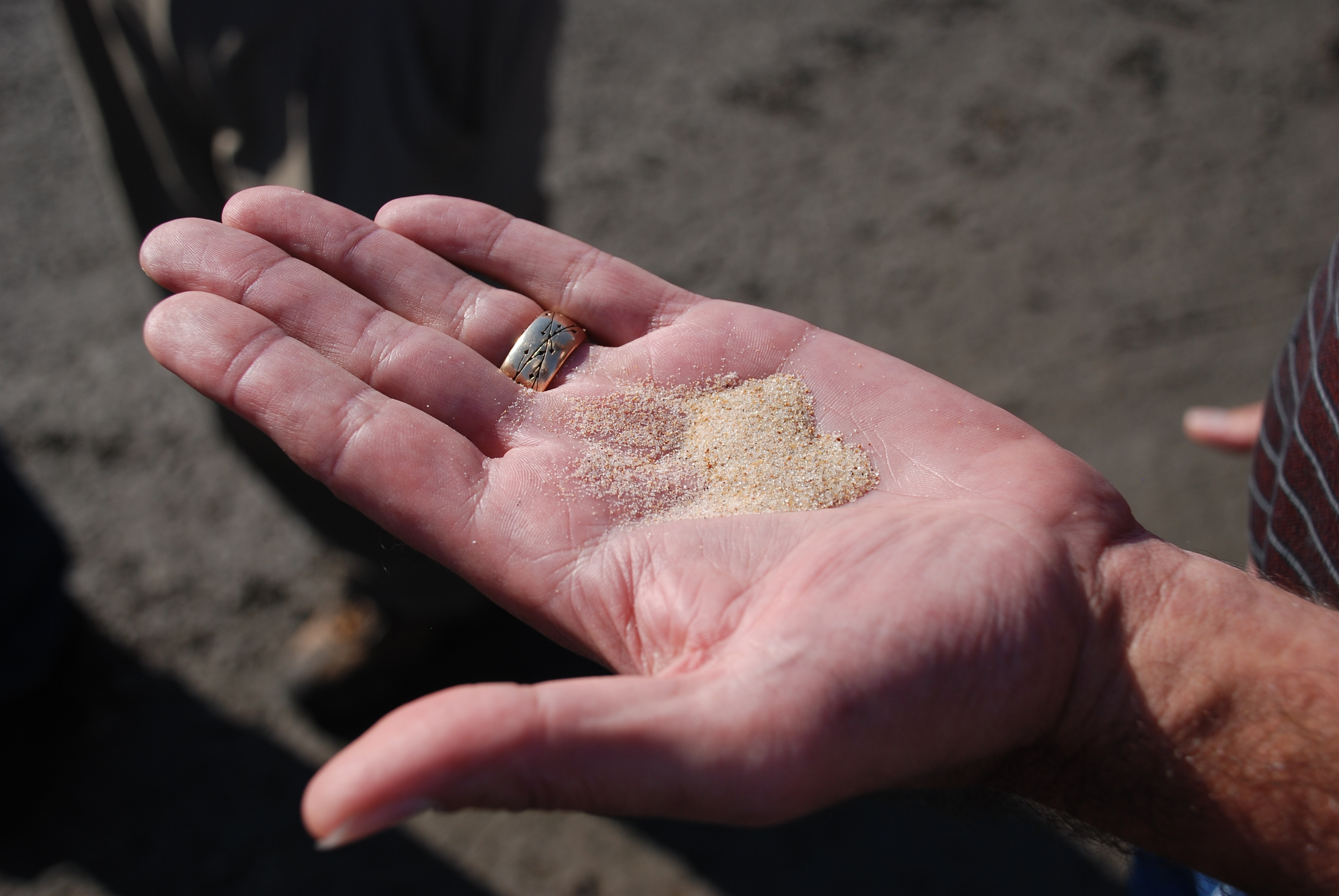
Fine-grained silica sand is typical of the Driftless Area and is mined for use in hydraulic fracturing.

Fine-grained silica sand is typical of the Driftless and is mined for use primarily in hydraulic fracturing, commonly known as "fracking".

The presence of sandstone bedrock at or near the surface encourages sand mining in the Driftless, with Wisconsin at the industry's forefront. The sandstone contains quartz (silica) sand grains of the ideal hardness, shape, and size for use in hydraulic fracturing by the petroleum and natural gas industries. The mining activity involves quarrying the sandstone bedrock by blasting with dynamite, crushing the rock, washing, drying, and grading the resulting sand, and transporting the sand out by barge or train. In 2017, there were 73 frac sand mines in operation in Wisconsin alone, and there are five operating industrial sand mines in Minnesota; the proliferation of sand mines in the region created new jobs and generated economic activity. But the prominence of industry has raised concern about its effect on water quality, air pollution caused by silica dust, noise and light pollution, heavy truck traffic, and the destruction of hills and ridges for which the region is known. Industry changes as of 2021 have caused Hi-Crush, Covia, and Superior Silica Sands—all with operations in Wisconsin—to liquidate their frac sand mines and declare bankruptcy.

== Geographic extent ==
=== Minnesota ===
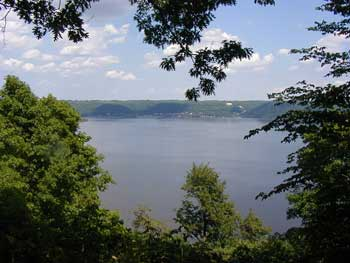
Mississippi River from Frontenac State Park, Minnesota (USDA, Natural Resources Conservation Service)

Corresponding to the southeast geological region of Minnesota, the colloquial "Driftless Area" (though the whole region was glaciated) begins at about Fort Snelling. Starting as a narrow sliver against the Mississippi, it widens to the west as one goes south. The western boundary is the Bemis-Altamont moraine. Another more easily found reference to the western boundary is the approximate line of Minnesota State Highway 56.

The upland plateau lies west of the incised tributaries to the Mississippi. The historic vegetation was mixed woodland, with occasional goat prairies on southwesterly facing slopes. In the western section is "an old plateau covered by loess [...] along the eastern border and pre-Wisconsin age glacial till in the central and western parts. The western portion is a gently rolling glacial till plain that is covered by loess in places."

The area includes all or part of Dakota, Goodhue, Rice, Wabasha, Winona, Olmsted, Dodge, Houston, Fillmore, and Mower Counties. Aside from the southeastern suburban sprawl of the Twin Cities, Rochester is the main urban area. Additional communities include Red Wing, Lake City, Winona, La Crescent, Chatfield, Lanesboro, Rushford, Houston, and Caledonia.

Glacial River Warren, in whose bed the Minnesota River now flows, entered the "Driftless Area" just downriver from present-day Minneapolis-Saint Paul, at Fort Snelling, over River Warren Falls, "an impressive 2700 feet (823 m) across and 175 feet (53 m) tall, over 10 times as wide as Niagara falls" (this has since receded to become Saint Anthony Falls). The region is characterized "by the absence of glacial drift deposits, the sculpted topography, and the presence of the ancient limestone immediately beneath the soil and in cliff outcroppings." The Minnesota Driftless Area did not reach the Twin Cities or any areas to the north or west of them; rather, the Twin Cities marked the edge of glaciation, with substantial terminal moraines overlying the region.

The largest protected area is Richard J. Dorer Memorial Hardwood State Forest, which contains some state-owned land, but is mostly private, controlled by state conservation easements.

=== Wisconsin ===
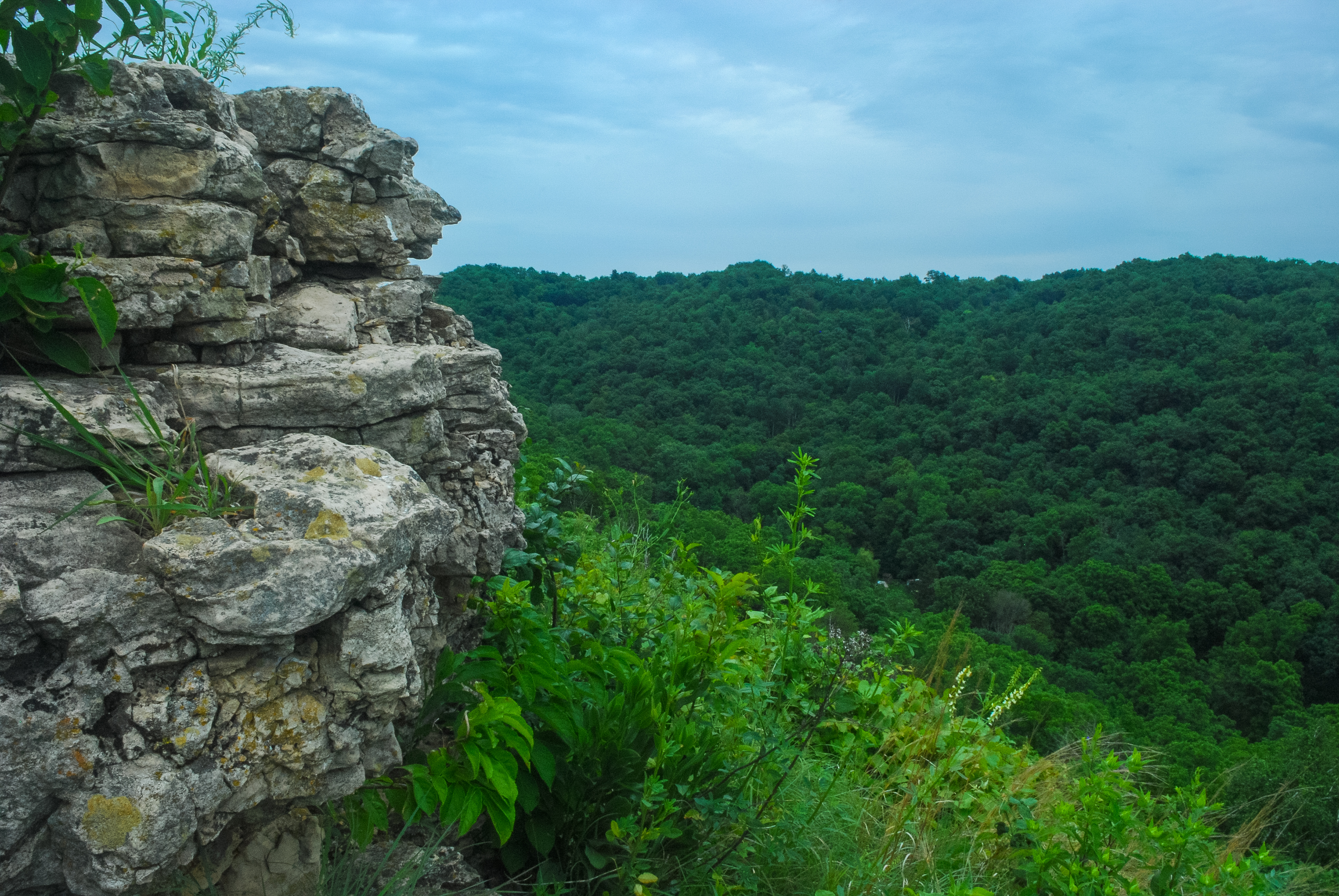
Sugar Creek Bluffs in Crawford County, Wisconsin

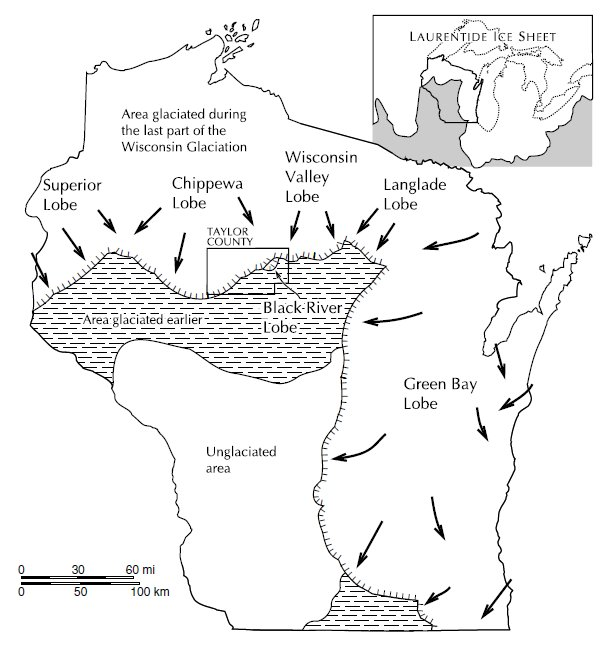
Extent of glaciation in Wisconsin

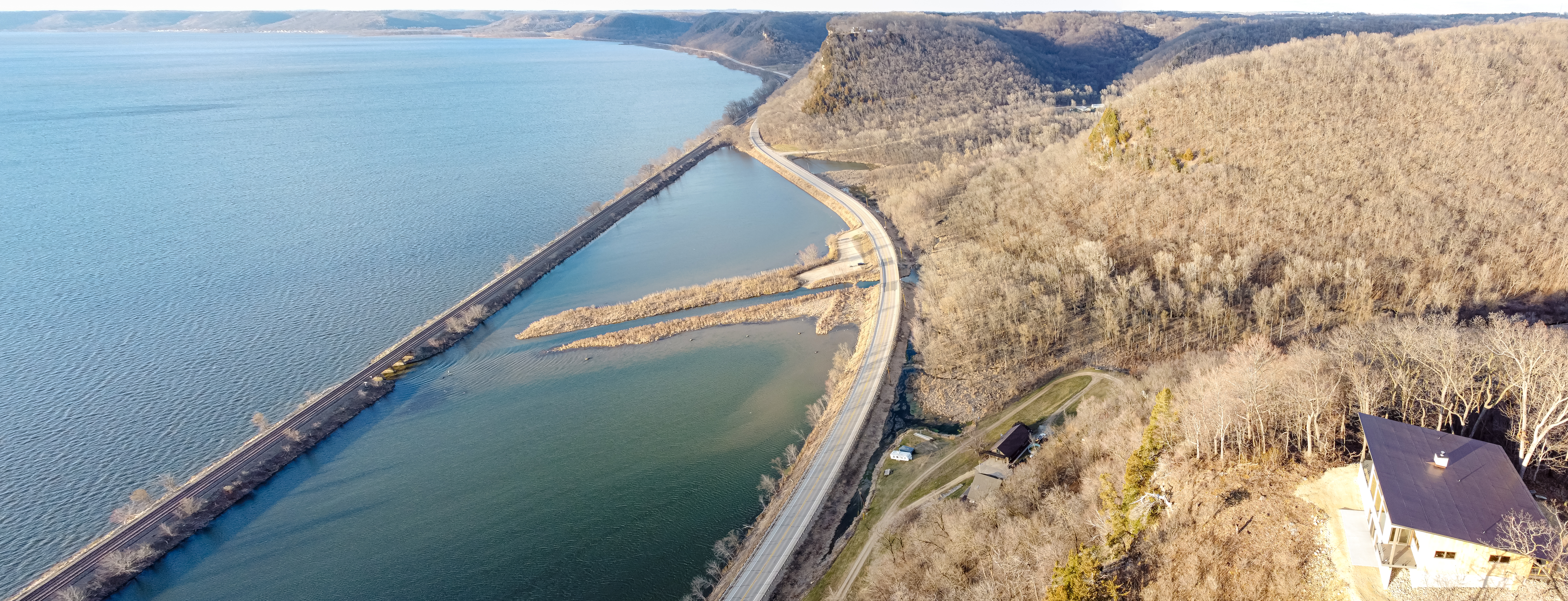
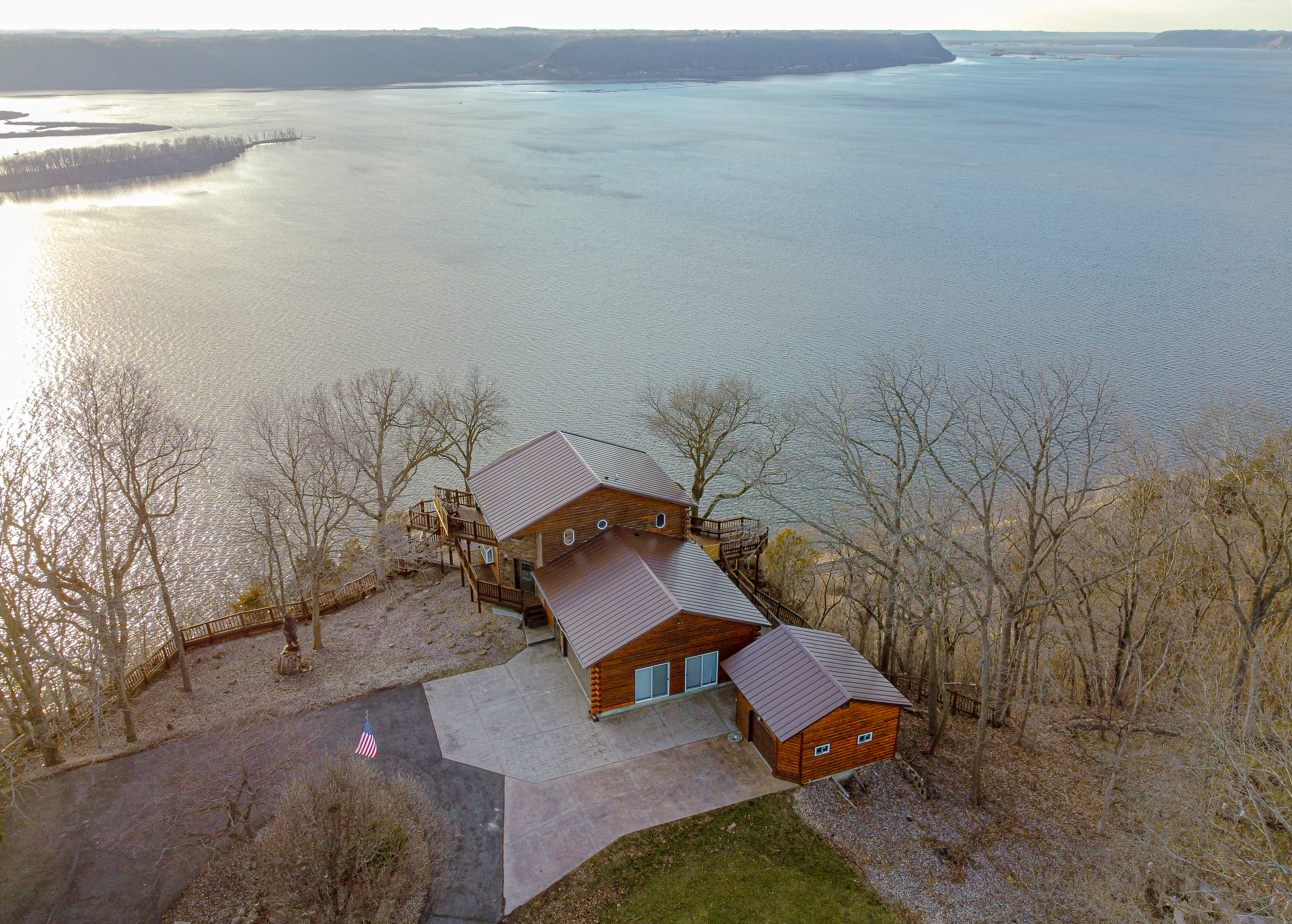
Houses in the Driftless Area on the Upper Mississippi River north of Lynxville
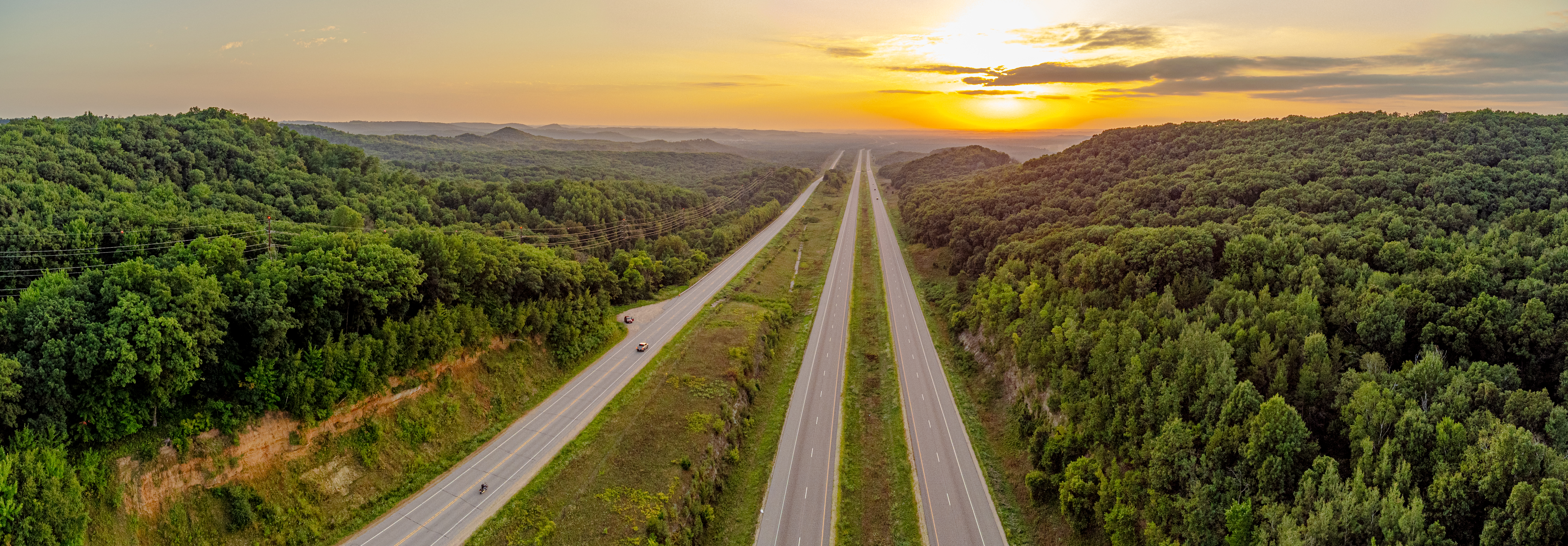
Driftless Region Eastern side where I-90 enters the Driftless area

Around 85% of the Driftless Area lies within Wisconsin, comprising much of the southwestern quarter of the state. The border is defined by the catchment of the Chippewa River on the north, and somewhat west (or east, depending on if the southwestern portion of Wisconsin's Central Plain is included) of the north-south line of the Wisconsin River. Where the Wisconsin River turns west to join the Mississippi, the area to the south, including the whole of Grant County as well as most of Lafayette County, are part of the Driftless Area.

The rugged terrain comprising most of the Driftless Area is distinct from the rest of Wisconsin, and is known locally as the Coulee Region. The steep ridges, numerous rock outcroppings, and deep, narrow valleys in the Driftless Area are in marked contrast with the rest of the state, where glaciers have modified the landscape. The hilly unglaciated landscape is well represented in Wisconsin's Coulee Experimental State Forest, Wildcat Mountain State Park, Governor Dodge State Park, Perrot State Park, and the Kickapoo Valley Reserve.

Karst topography is most prominent in Wisconsin. Eagle Cave in Blue River, WI and Cave of the Mounds, near Blue Mounds, WI, are better known examples.

The Driftless Area is in all or part of Pierce, Pepin, Dunn, Eau Claire, Buffalo, Trempealeau, Jackson, La Crosse, Monroe, Juneau, Vernon, Richland, Sauk, Crawford, Iowa, Dane, Green, Grant, and Lafayette Counties. If the less restrictive definition of the Driftless Area is used (which includes the unglaciated southwestern portion of Wisconsin's Central Plain), then Adams and portions of southern Wood and Portage counties are also included. La Crosse is the principal urban area wholly within the Driftless Area, while the larger Madison's far western suburbs are located on the edges of the area. Small cities and towns are scattered throughout the region. Numerous Amish settlements are also within Wisconsin's Driftless Area.

The U.S. Army maintains a presence at Fort McCoy in Monroe County between Sparta and Tomah, immediately south of the Black River State Forest. The property is used mainly for military training exercises, although troops have also been based there for deployments overseas.

The Coulee Region portion of the Driftless Area comprises much of Wisconsin's Western Upland geographical region. The most rugged part of Wisconsin's Driftless area is also called the Ocooch Mountains.

Largely rural in character, land cover is forest, farmland, and grassland/pasture; modest wetlands are found in river valleys, and along the Mississippi. Row crop farming is less encountered than elsewhere in the state. Away from the Mississippi, Wisconsin, and other major rivers, much of the terrain is gently rolling, supporting dairy farms. In other areas, the rugged nature of the topography in the region is not conducive to farming, except on ridge tops and in river valleys. The sides of the ridges are often too steep for farming, and are usually forested. The Coulee Experimental State Forest near La Crosse was created in part to test soil conservation practices to prevent soil erosion in the hilly Driftless Area.

The northeastern portion of the Driftless area was covered by or bordered by Glacial Lake Wisconsin during the Wisconsin glaciation. The steep-sided rocky bluffs present in Roche-a-Cri State Park and Mill Bluff State Park are Cambrian outliers of the Franconia cuesta to the southwest and were once islands or sea stacks in the ancient lake. The flat plain in which these bluffs lie is in the southwest portion of Wisconsin's Central Plain geographic region, and was formed in part by sediments falling to the bottom of Glacial Lake Wisconsin. This flat plain consists of sandy deposits and contains many bogs left over from Glacial Lake Wisconsin. Many of these bogs have been converted into cranberry marshes, helping to make Wisconsin a leader in cranberry production. The remainder of the sand plain consists of forest and irrigated farmland. The Dells of the Wisconsin River were carved through the bedrock during the sudden draining of Glacial Lake Wisconsin at the end of the last ice age.

Due to the lack of natural lakes in the Coulee region, several large artificial lakes have been constructed for flood control and recreational purposes, including Dutch Hollow Lake and Lake Redstone in Sauk County, Blackhawk Lake in Iowa County, and Yellowstone Lake (in Yellowstone State Park) in Lafayette County. Plans for a large reservoir on the Kickapoo River at La Farge, Wisconsin were dropped in 1975 after much controversy due to cost-benefit and environmental concerns. Land previously acquired for the reservoir became the Kickapoo Valley Reserve, an 8,569 acre public forest and wildlife area.

Wazee Lake, at 355 feet (108 m) deep, is Wisconsin's deepest inland lake, and is located in Jackson County in the northeast portion of the Driftless Area. The artificial lake lies in the former open pit Jackson County Iron Mine and is the centerpiece of the Wazee Lake Recreation Area. Due to its great depth, vertical underwater cliffs, clear water, and submerged mining features, the lake is popular with scuba divers.

The highest point in the Driftless area is West Blue Mound, with an elevation of 1,719 feet (524 m). The feature is in Blue Mound State Park, in Iowa County.

During the 19th and early 20th centuries, lead and zinc mining was a major industrial activity in the Driftless Area, drawing many immigrants to settle in the region to work in the mines. Early miners often lived in the mine tunnels, leading outsiders to compare them to the burrowing badger, a nickname that eventually came to be used for all Wisconsin residents. An example of an early lead shot tower and smelting house is preserved in Tower Hill State Park.

Due to the influx of early miners, the lead mining region became Wisconsin's most populous area at the time. The first capitol of the Wisconsin Territory was at Belmont, Lafayette County, in the heart of the lead mining region. The site of the first capitol is preserved at the First Capitol Historic Site.

Three units of the Ice Age National Scientific Reserve are within or adjacent to the Driftless Area: Devil's Lake State Park, Mill Bluff State Park, and Cross Plains State Park. In addition, the Ice Age Trail follows the terminal moraine of the maximum glacial extent from the last ice age and enters the Driftless Area in several locations.

Other notable natural features include the Baraboo Range (consisting of two heavily forested, steep, rocky quartzite ridges with mountain-type scenery), rock formations in Natural Bridge State Park (Wisconsin), the forested bluffs, floodplains, islands, and sandbars in the Lower Wisconsin River State Riverway, the confluence of the Wisconsin River with the Mississippi River at Wyalusing State Park, Trempealeau Mountain State Natural Area in the Mississippi River valley at Perrot State Park, and the gorge and rock formations surrounding the Wisconsin River at the Dells of the Wisconsin River. The Black River State Forest protects a large area of the North Woods, rocky bluffs, sandy plains, and river shoreline on the northeastern edge of the Driftless Area that provides habitat for several wolf packs and one of Wisconsin's reintroduced elk herds.

=== Iowa ===
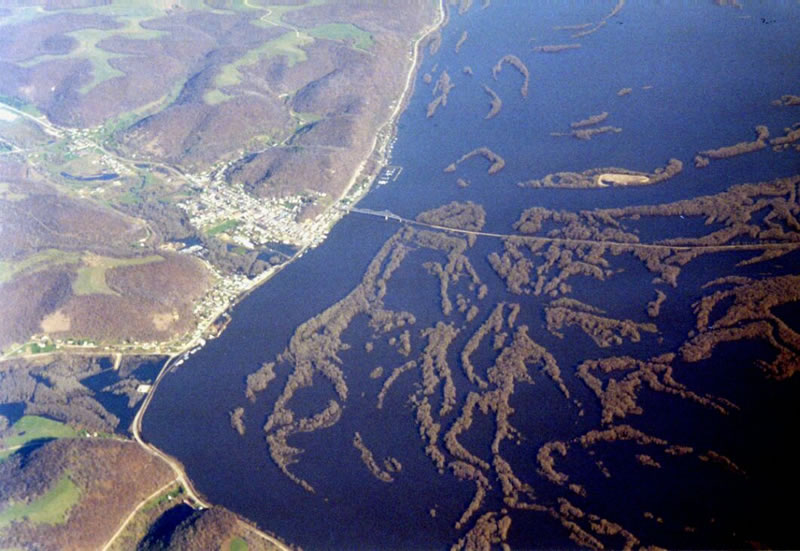
Aerial view looking north, April 14, 2001, with the Upper Mississippi River at floodstage. At center, the Black Hawk Bridge is visible. Big Lake is immediately north. Just south of the bridge one can see the mouth of Clear Creek, and just south of this, the mouth of Village Creek. The rugged nature of the Driftless Area is evident.

An area in northeast Iowa that shares similar topographic characteristics to the Driftless Area in southeastern Wisconsin is the Paleozoic Plateau. For counties inland from the Mississippi, evidence is largely confined to the valleys of streams and rivers. It encompasses all of Allamakee, and part of Clayton, Fayette, Delaware, Winneshiek, Howard, Dubuque, and Jackson Counties. Dubuque is the only metropolitan area.

The region is distinct from the "Iowan Erosion Surface to the west and the Southern Iowa Drift Plain to the south." A line east of the most easterly tributaries of the Wapsipinicon River defines the western boundary of the landform region, with the catchment of the Maquoketa River south of Bellevue serving as a southern boundary. The westernmost tributaries of the Upper Iowa, Yellow, and Turkey Rivers flow east and south from the vicinity of this moraine.

Outside of Dubuque, this region of Iowa is thinly populated. In the western section, agriculture and livestock raising are the norm. As one travels east, and as the valleys tumble down to the Mississippi, much of the land is virtually wild, with a great deal of it publicly owned. The state maintains an extensive number of wildlife management areas, along with state forests and state parks.

The most impressive area is on the Mississippi, between Pikes Peak State Park, opposite the Wisconsin River down to Guttenberg, where bluffs lining the river reach their maximum height. This is apparently an Iowa continuation of Military Ridge, a catchment-defining divide in Wisconsin that was used for the Military Ridge Road, part of which is included in Military Ridge State Trail, both across the River in Wisconsin.

Effigy Mounds National Monument is at the heart of a network of adjacent parks, state forests, preserves, as well as national wildlife refuges, all of which preserve and illustrate the features of the Driftless, where "patchy remnants of Pre-Illinoian glacial drift more than 500,000 years old recently have been discovered in the area." Additional protected areas are Cold Water Spring State Preserve near Decorah, Maquoketa Caves State Park northwest of Maquoketa, Bellevue State Park adjacent to Bellevue, White Pine Hollow State Forest (which protects Iowa's only remaining groves of old-growth white pine trees) near Dubuque, and the Yellow River State Forest in the southeastern corner of Allamakee County, Iowa.

=== Illinois ===
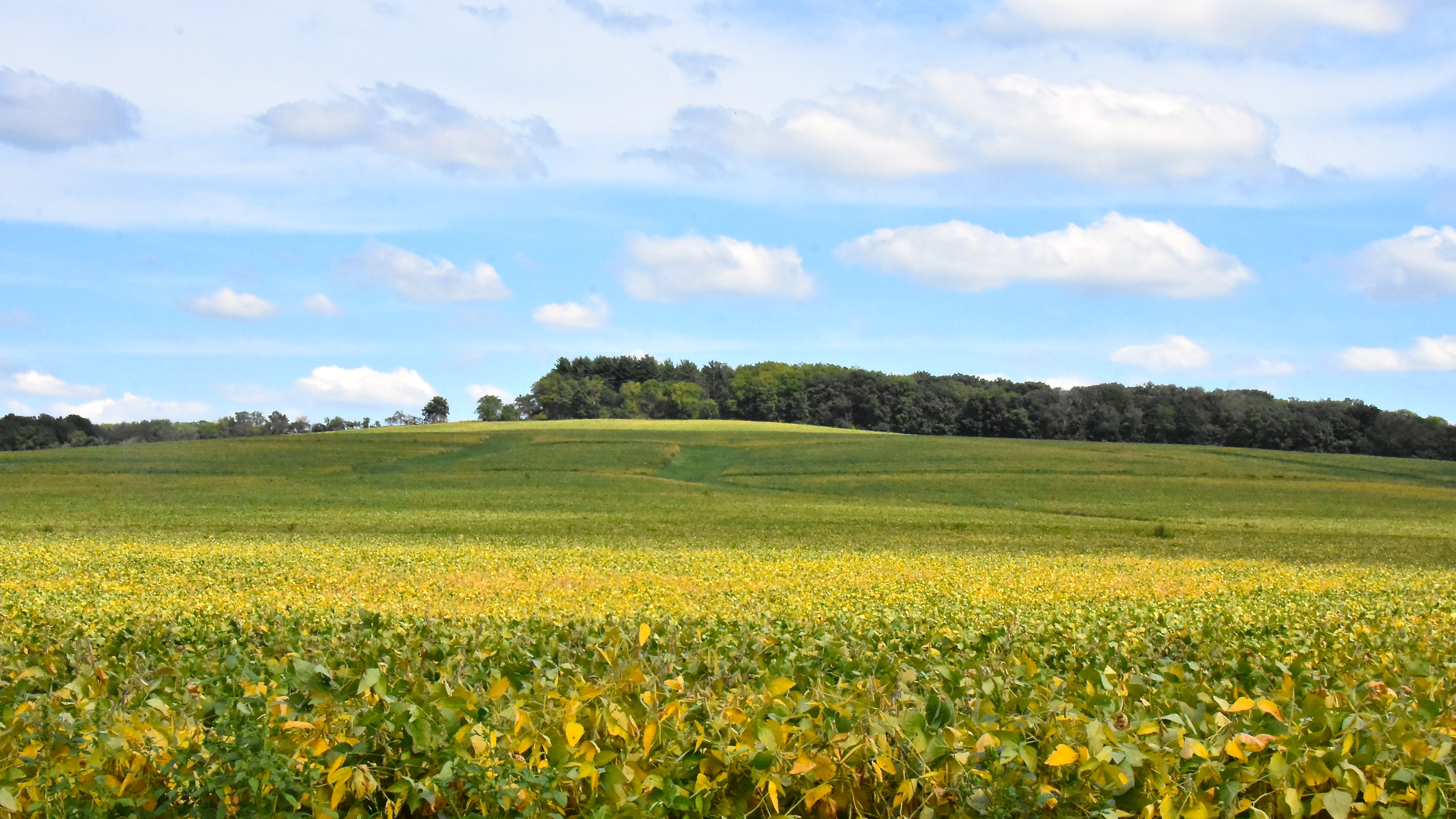
Charles Mound, the highest natural point in Illinois at 1,235 feet (376 m) NAVD 88, is in the Illinois portion of the Driftless Area.

The Illinois portion of the Driftless Area is confined mainly to Jo Daviess County; western parts of Carroll County (the Mississippi River bluffs characteristic of the Driftless terminate around Savanna) and a tiny portion of northwest Whiteside County are also included. The region contains the highest points in the state, of which "the most notable are Charles Mound and Benton Mound, rising to heights of 1,246 feet (380 m) and 1,226 feet (374 m) respectively." The region "has many sinkholes and sinkhole ponds."

The valley of the Apple River has a major canyon, with Apple River Canyon occupying much of it. The mouth of this river, near Hanover adjacent to the former Savanna Army Depot, comes close to the southern end of the Driftless Area on the eastern side of the Mississippi (see Lock and Dam No. 13).

As in Wisconsin, the Illinois portion of the driftless area was a major early center for lead and zinc mining.

== In popular culture ==
- Frank Lloyd Wright's Taliesin, home of American architect, was completed in 1911 using local limestone and set on the brow of a rugged hill to emphasize its ties to the Driftless Area.
- The 1989 film Field of Dreams was filmed on location in Dyersville, Iowa, within the Driftless Area.
- Driftless is a 2008 novel by David Rhodes.
- The Driftless Area is a 2015 Canadian-American neo-noir dramedy film based on the 2006 novel of the same name by Tom Drury, who co-wrote the screenplay.
- The Driftless Reader gathers more than 80 writings that highlight the Driftless Area's natural and cultural history, landscape, and literature.
- In 2018, Brad Zellar worked with photographer Jason Vaughn on Driftless (TBW Books). Vaughn's large-format color photographs of farmland, forests, and rural communities are paired with Zellar's essays, which weave together history, folklore, and personal observation.

== See also ==
- A Sand County Almanac, a book by Aldo Leopold about the flora and fauna in the Coulee region
