= Loew Lake Unit, Kettle Moraine State Forest =

State Forest in Washington County, Wisconsin

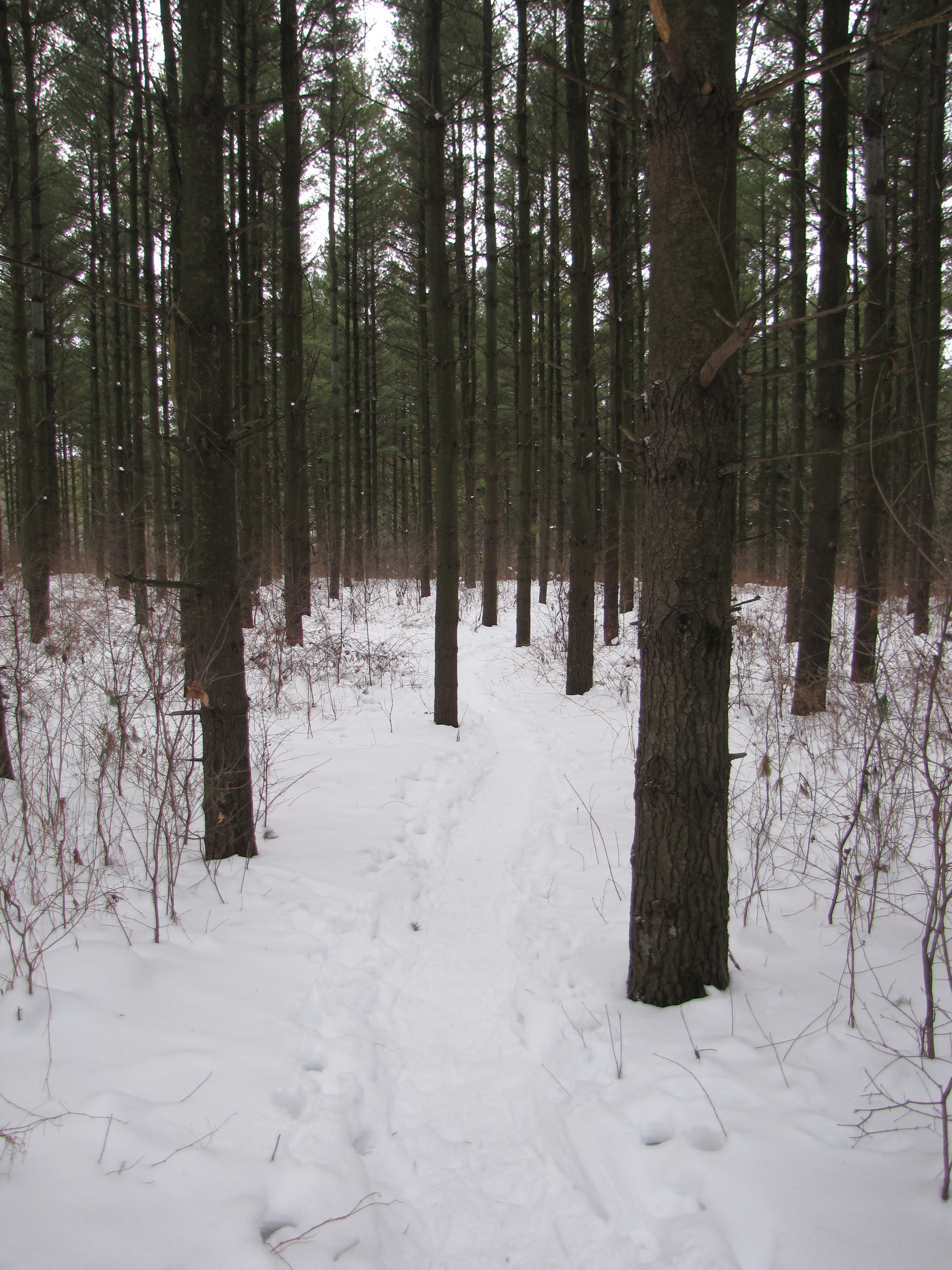

- Location within Wisconsin Location within the United States
- Interactive map of Loew Lake Unit, Kettle Moraine State Forest
- Location: Washington County, Wisconsin, United States
- Coordinates: 43°13′7″N 88°18′52″W
- Area: 1,090 acres (440 ha)
- Established: 1987
- Administrator: Wisconsin Department of Natural Resources
- Website: Official website
- Wisconsin State Forests

The Loew Lake Unit of the Kettle Moraine State Forest is a 1,090-acre (440 ha) member of the Wisconsin state park system. The unit offers hiking, hunting, and horse riding along the east branch of the Oconomowoc River and the shore of 24-acre (9.7 ha) Loew Lake, and also features a number of large conifer plantations. A section of the Ice Age National Scenic Trail runs through the park as it follows the Kettle Moraine.
