= Black River State Forest =

State Forest in Jackson County, WIsconsin

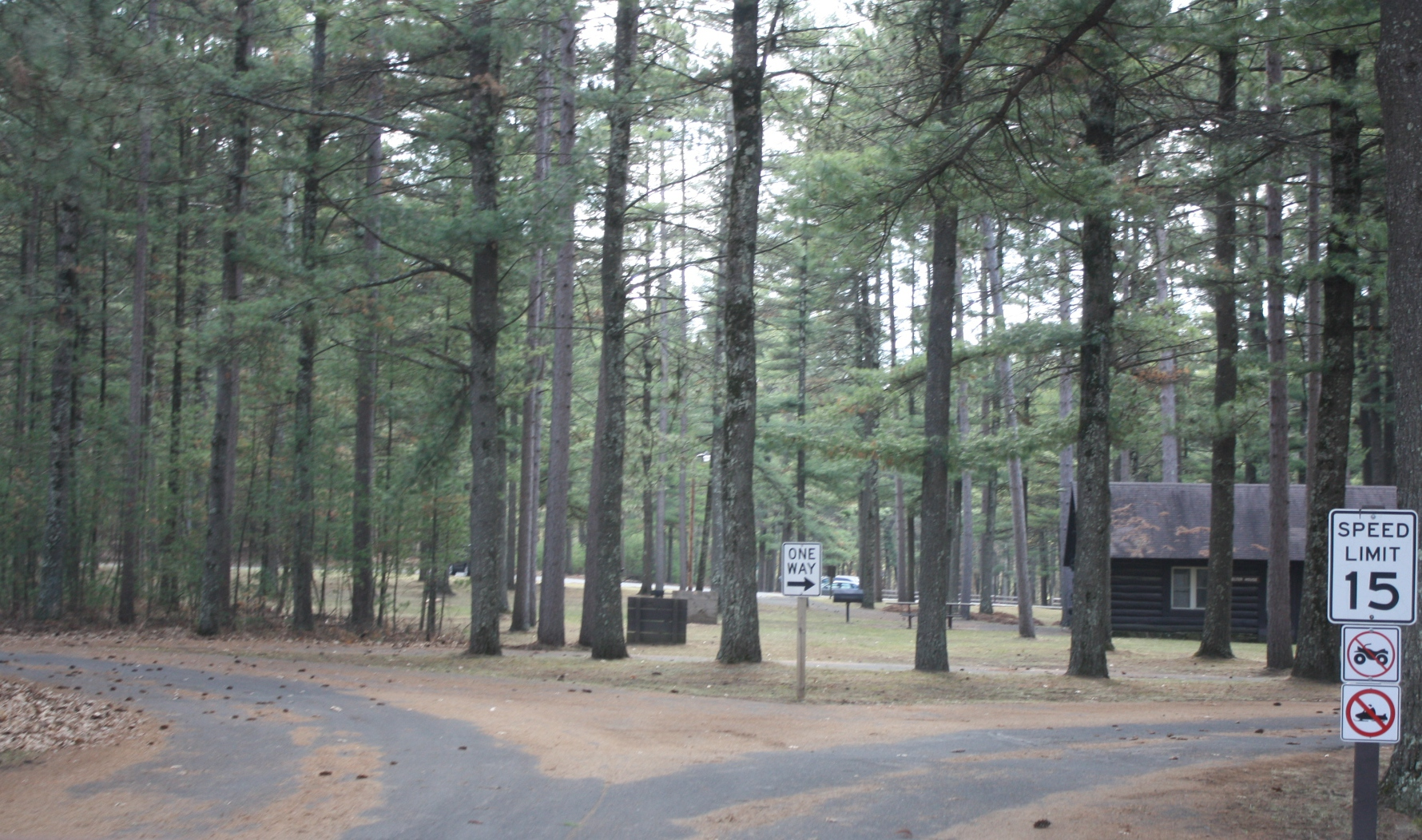
- Campgrounds entrance

- Location within Wisconsin Location within the United States
- Interactive map of Black River State Forest
- Location: Jackson County, Wisconsin, United States
- Nearest city: Black River Falls, Wisconsin
- Coordinates: 44°18′29″N 90°37′27″W
- Area: 68,900 acres (27,900 ha)
- Established: 1957
- Visitors: 25,533 (in 2024)
- Administrator: Wisconsin Department of Natural Resources
- Website: Official website
- Wisconsin State Forests

Black River State Forest is a state forest located near Black River Falls in the western half of Jackson County, Wisconsin, United States. The forest lies on the edge of the unglaciated Driftless Area, includes some 12 miles of the Black River plus three miles of the Black River's East Fork, and is more rugged than what is found in the eastern half of the county. It has campsites and trails, allows for hunting, ATV riding, and canoeing, and is administered by the Wisconsin Department of Natural Resources.

== History ==
Black River State Forest was established in 1957, after the Federal government transferred 59,000 acres to the Wisconsin Conservation Department (now the Wisconsin Department of Natural Resources). Further land purchases have seen the forest grow to approximately 68,900 acres.

== Environmental management ==
Each year, around 1000 acres (4.05 km^{2}) of forest in the park are used for logging. Logs are harvested for regeneration of the forest via selective cutting. In 2015 and 2016, elk were reintroduced into the park.
