= Lock and Dam No. 13 =

Dam in Illinois and Iowa, U.S.

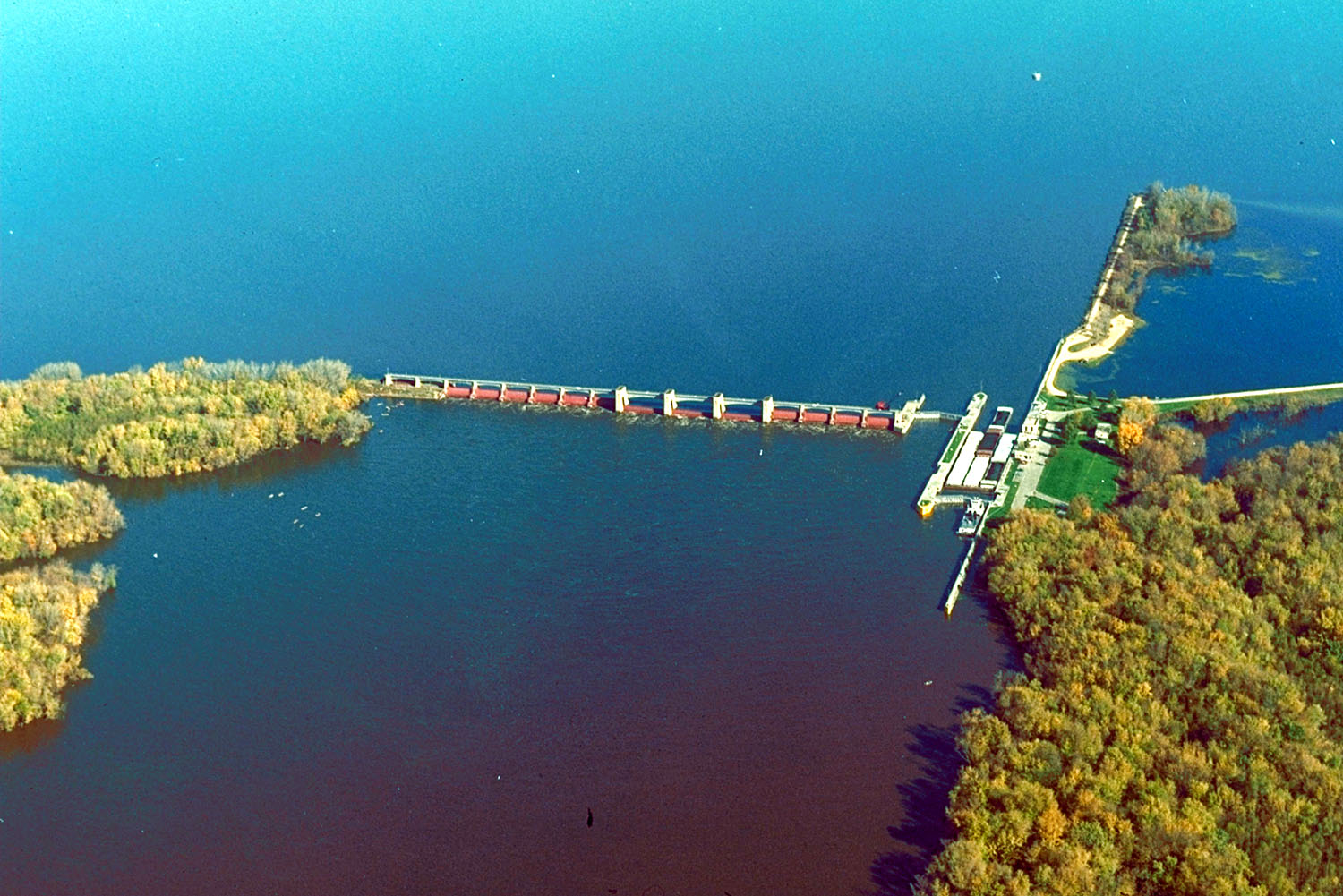
- Lock and Dam No. 13 on the Mississippi River. View is upriver to the north.
- Interactive map of Lock and Dam No. 13
- Location: Clinton, Iowa / Fulton Township, Whiteside County, Illinois, USA
- Coordinates: 41°53′53″N 90°09′21″W
- Construction began: 1935
- Opening date: May 13, 1938
- Operators: U.S. Army Corps of Engineers, Rock Island District

Dam and spillways
- Impounds: Upper Mississippi River
- Length: 5,138 feet (1,566.1 m)

Reservoir
- Creates: Pool 13
- Total capacity: 192,000 acre⋅ft (0.237 km^{3})
- Catchment area: 85,500 mi^{2} (221,000 km^{2})
- Lock and Dam No. 13 Historic District
- U.S. National Register of Historic Places
- U.S. Historic district
- Location within Illinois Location within the United States
- Location: 4999 Lock Rd., Fulton, Illinois
- Area: 254.2 acres (102.9 ha)
- Built: 1939
- Architect: U.S. Army Corps of Engineers
- Architectural style: Moderne, Lock and Dam
- MPS: Upper Mississippi River 9-Foot Navigation Project MPS
- NRHP reference No.: 04000173
- Added to NRHP: March 10, 2004

Lock and Dam No. 13 is a lock and dam located on the Upper Mississippi River above Fulton, Illinois and Clinton, Iowa, United States. This facility offers visitors a view of the barges and boats locking through on the widest pool in the Upper Mississippi River.

The movable portion of the dam is 1,066 feet (324.9 m) long and consists of ten tainter gates and three roller gates. The non-movable portion of the dam continues toward the Iowa shore with a 200 feet (61.0 m) storage yard, a 728 feet (221.9 m) non-submersible dike, a 1,650 feet (502.9 m) submersible dike, and a 1,315 feet (400.8 m) non-submersible dike with two 90 feet (27.4 m) transitional sections between the submersible and non-submersible sections. There is also an 8,940 feet (2,724.9 m) non-submersible dike on the Illinois side east of the locks. The main lock is 110 feet (33.5 m) wide by 600 feet (182.9 m) long and like most other sites in the project, it has a smaller, unfinished, auxiliary lock. In 2004, the facility was listed in the National Register of Historic Places as Lock and Dam No. 13 Historic District, #04000173 covering 2,542 acres (10.3 km^{2}), 1 building, 6 structures, and 4 objects.

This lock and dam represent the man-made exit from the Driftless Area, where shipping has to travel a few feet above bedrock over the 9-foot (2.7 m) shipping channel. It's about 522 feet (159 m) above sea level.

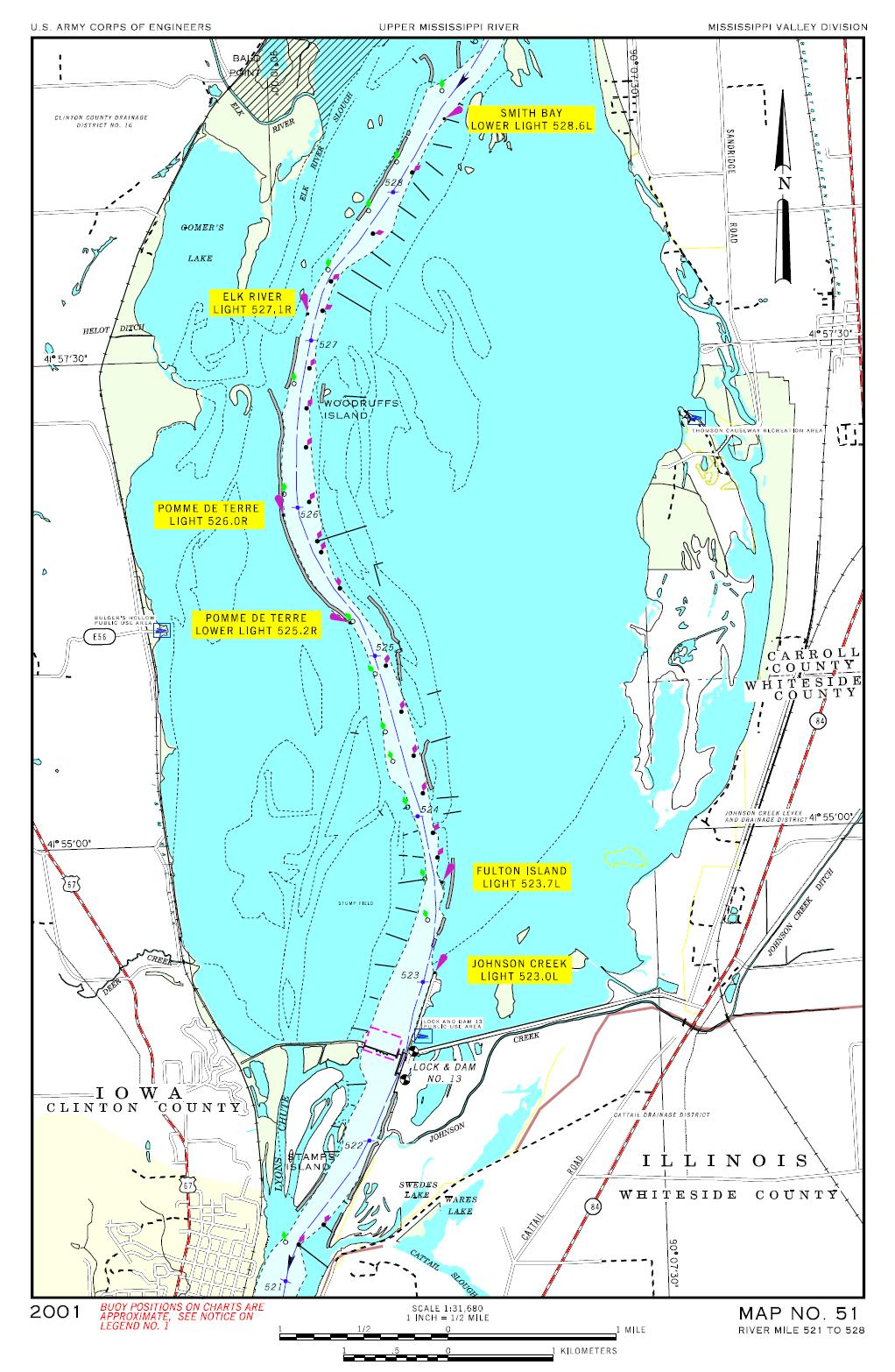
Map of Lock and Dam No. 13

== See also ==
- Public Works Administration dams list
- Upper Mississippi River National Wildlife and Fish Refuge
