= David Rhodes (author) =

American novelist

David Allen Rhodes (December 6, 1946 – November 10, 2022) was an American novelist. He published six novels; the most recent, Painting Beyond Walls, was published in 2022.

== Biography ==
Rhodes grew up outside Des Moines, Iowa. He earned a Bachelor of Arts degree from Marlboro College in 1969 and a Master of Fine Arts degree from The Iowa Writers' Workshop in 1971.

In 1977, Rhodes suffered a motorcycle accident that left him paralyzed from the chest down. Driftless was his first book since his return to publishing. In 1983, John Gardner had noted Rhodes favorably in On Becoming a Novelist which had helped lead, years later, to Rhodes' publishing his final three novels with Milkweed.

Rhodes lived with his wife, Edna, in rural Wonewoc, Wisconsin. He died on November 10, 2022, in Iowa City, Iowa.

== Works ==
- The Last Fair Deal Going Down (Atlantic Little Brown, 1972)
- The Easter House (Harper & Row, 1974)
- Rock Island Line (Harper & Row, 1975)
- Driftless (Milkweed Editions, 2008); a novel set in the Driftless Area, in the fictional town of Words, Wisconsin
- Jewelweed (Milkweed Editions, 2013)
- Painting Beyond Walls (Milkweed Editions, 2022)
