= List of Wisconsin state forests =

Location map of Wisconsin State Forests

A Wisconsin state forest is an area of forest in the U.S. state of Wisconsin managed by the Wisconsin Department of Natural Resources's Division of Forestry. They are managed for outdoor recreation, watershed and habitat preservation, and sustainable forestry. The various units total 471,329 acres (1,907 km^{2}), although many contain extensive private inholdings. Wisconsin's state forests are often co-listed with Wisconsin's state park system, which is maintained by the Division of Parks and Recreation.

Name	County	Area	Estab- lished	Body of water	Remarks
Black River State Forest	Jackson	67,070 acres (271.4 km^{2})	1957	Black River	
Brule River State Forest	Douglas	40,882 acres (165.4 km^{2})	1907	Bois Brule River, Lake Superior	Site of Cedar Island Lodge, where American presidents have vacationed. Popular with canoeists, and cross-country skiers.
Coulee Experimental State Forest	La Crosse	2,972 acres (364 km^{2})	1960	Dutch Creek	The forest is used for long-term forest watershed research studies to develop land management practices.
Flambeau River State Forest	Sawyer, Price	90,147 acres (364 km^{2})	1930	Flambeau River	
Governor Knowles State Forest	Burnett, Polk	19,753 acres (79.9 km^{2})	1970	St. Croix River	Managed as a wilderness buffer for the Saint Croix National Scenic Riverway.
Havenwoods State Forest	Milwaukee	237 acres (0.95 km^{2})	1979	Lincoln Creek	A green space and environmental education center within Milwaukee city limits.
Kettle Moraine State Forest - Lapham Peak Unit	Waukesha	1,006 acres (4.07 km^{2})	1985	None	
Kettle Moraine State Forest - Loew Lake Unit	Washington	1,090 acres (4.41 km^{2})	1987	Oconomowoc River, Loew Lake	
Kettle Moraine State Forest - Mukwonago River Unit	Waukesha, Walworth	907 acres (367 ha)	2008	Mukwonago River	Adjacent to Lulu Lake State Natural Area
Kettle Moraine State Forest - Northern Unit	Sheboygan, Fond du Lac, Washington	29,268 acres (118 km^{2})	1936	Numerous kettle lakes	
Kettle Moraine State Forest - Pike Lake Unit	Washington	678 acres (2.74 km^{2})	1960	Pike Lake	
Kettle Moraine State Forest - Southern Unit	Waukesha, Walworth, Jefferson	22,300 acres (90.2 km^{2})	1936	Numerous kettle lakes	
Northern Highland-American Legion State Forest	Iron, Vilas, Oneida	223,283 acres (903 km^{2})	1925	Numerous lakes and streams	
Peshtigo River State Forest	Marinette, Oconto	9,200 acres (37.2 km^{2})	2001	Peshtigo River	
Point Beach State Forest	Manitowoc	2,903 acres (11.7 km^{2})	1938	Lake Michigan	

== See also ==
- List of Wisconsin state parks
- List of national forests of the United States
