= Coulee Experimental State Forest =

State forest in La Crosse County, Wisconsin

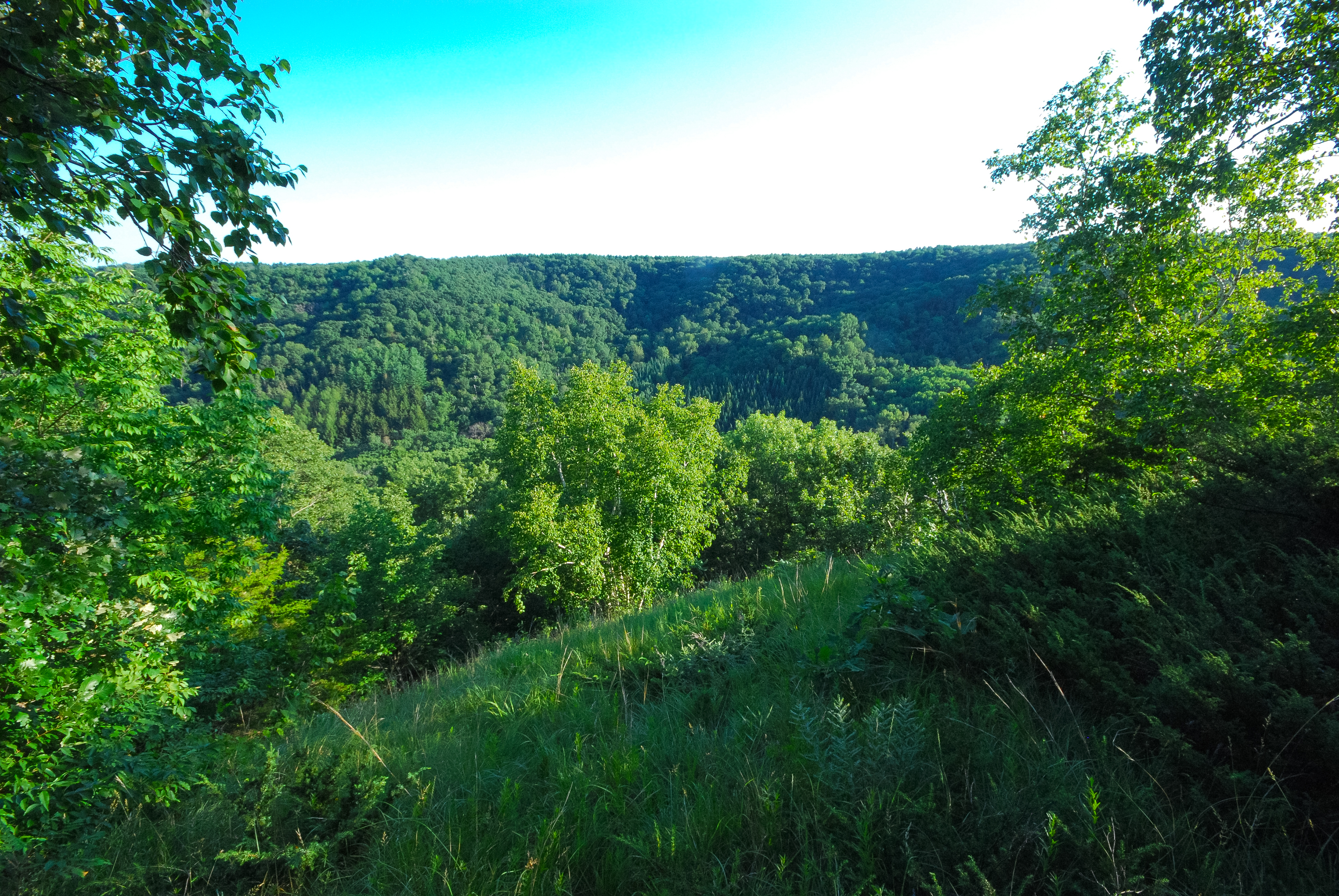
- Northeast Coulee oak woodland

- Location within Wisconsin Location within the United States
- Interactive map of Coulee Experimental State Forest
- Location: La Crosse County, Wisconsin, United States
- Nearest city: Onalaska, Wisconsin
- Coordinates: 43°51′07″N 91°02′01″W
- Area: 2,972 acres (1,203 ha)
- Established: 1959
- Administrator: Wisconsin Department of Natural Resources
- Website: Official website
- Wisconsin State Forests

Coulee Experimental State Forest is a state forest located in La Crosse County, Wisconsin, United States. It is administered by the Wisconsin Department of Natural Resources. The hilly terrain within the state forest is an excellent representation of Wisconsin's portion of the Driftless Area.
