= Clear Creek (Allamakee County, Iowa) =

Creek in Iowa, United States

Coordinates: 43.4335846°N 91.4087486°W

Clear Creek is a minor tributary of the Upper Mississippi River entirely contained within Allamakee County, Iowa. It enters the Mississippi into Navigation Pool 9 through the city of Lansing, Iowa. Iowa Highway 9 runs through its canyon. It has been restored as fishing stream for brown trout. The stream gives its name to Clear Creek Park in Lansing.

== See also ==
- List of rivers of Iowa
