= Wildcat Mountain State Park =

State park in Vernon County, Wisconsin

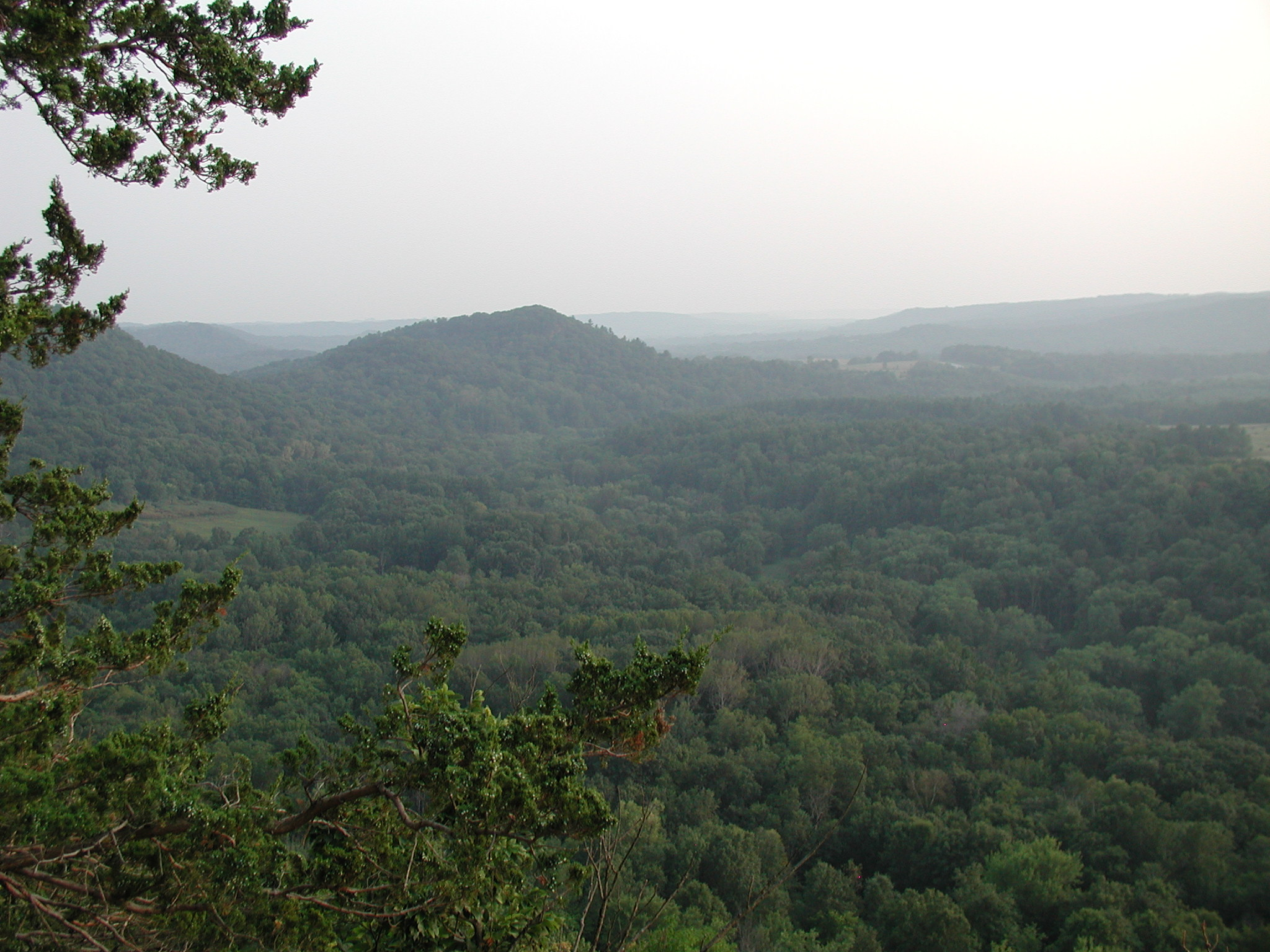
- Driftless Area from Wildcat Mountain State Park

- Location within Wisconsin Location within the United States
- Interactive map of Wildcat Mountain State Park
- Location: Vernon County, Wisconsin, United States
- Coordinates: 43°41′57″N 90°34′27″W
- Area: 3,643 acres (1,474 ha)
- Elevation: 1,263 ft (385 m)
- Established: 1948
- Administrator: Wisconsin Department of Natural Resources
- Website: Official website
- Wisconsin State Parks

Wildcat Mountain State Park is a state park of Wisconsin, United States, on the Kickapoo River in the Driftless Area. Sandstone bluffs topped with limestone, two of which are Wildcat Mountain and Mount Pisgah, provide views over the narrow valley of the river and its tributaries. The Kickapoo Valley Reserve is immediately adjacent and forms a continuous protected area. Wildcat Mountain State Park is open for year-round recreation including hiking, canoeing, fishing, and cross-country skiing. The 3,643-acre (1,474 ha) park is located in Vernon County near the town of Ontario, Wisconsin.

== History ==
Wildcat Mountain State Park is in the Kickapoo Valley. Archaeologists have found evidence of human occupation in the area dating back to 2000 BCE. Indian rock shelters and mounds have been found in and around the park. Most archaeologists believe that the shelters and mounds are remnants of temporary hunting camps. No evidence of agricultural practices have been found in the vicinity. Historians believe that the Natives used the Kickapoo Valley as a hunting area and held more permanent settlements near Tomah to the north and near the confluence of the Kickapoo and Wisconsin Rivers to the south.

The Kickapoo River was known as the "river of canoes" to the Indians who lived in the area. It was canoes that brought the first European explorers to the area. French voyageurs from New France explored the area and called the area Bateaux. The first English-speakers to see it were British fur traders who made use of the area after the end of the French and Indian War. When English-speaking settlers arrived in the area they pronounced it as Bad Axe. In fact, Vernon County was originally known as Bad Axe County and the name was not changed until 1862 to Vernon, which means greenness.

When the first American pioneers arrived in the Kickapoo Valley it was home to the Meskwaki and Sac Indians and later the Ho-Chunk. The Native Americans were forced from their land in 1837 when the government of the United States compelled the Ho-Chunk to move to points west of the Mississippi River. The land was covered with vast expanses of old-growth forests that were to soon fall under the axe of the lumberman. The first several waves of Americans to settle permanently in the area were "Yankee" settlers, that is to say they were from the New England states and were descended from the English Puritans who settled that region in the colonial era. The first "Yankee" settlers were overwhelmingly Congregationalist, and a few Congregationalist churches remain in the area to this day. When the New Englanders came to the area around Wildcat Mountain they were coming primarily as lumbermen and also as farmers. The second wave were Cornish miners who had come to the region as tin miners.

The need for lumber as the United States was growing was tremendous. Trees in New England were among the first to fall as they were nearest the early settlements of Boston and New York City. The forests of Pennsylvania fed the need for lumber in Philadelphia, Baltimore, Pittsburgh and the coal mines of the region. The lumber industry reached Wisconsin by 1844.

John Ostrander and William Saubert bought up many acres of land on what is now Wildcat Mountain State Park. Their lumber company purchased the land for $1.25 an acre from the government. Ostrander and Saubert clear-cut the forests and then sold the cleared land to new settlers for $2.50 an acre. A small community of lumberjacks and their families remained in the area as long as there were trees to be bought. Their settlement included a gristmill, post office and school. The community was abandoned by 1900.

Many people remained in the area and established small family farms. They used the natural resources of the Driftless Area in the Kickapoo Valley to provide them with many of their needs. They built their homes near streams that provided a steady supply of fresh water and fish for eating.

The lumber industry had a negative effect on the environment. Over harvesting of timber affected the water table in the Kickapoo Valley. The lack of trees and their extensive root systems underground caused an increase in runoff. Instead of soaking into the ground and trees the water was flushed out of the valley and down the river. The water level of the streams dropped and many natural springs dried up. Over use of the natural resources forced some of the early settlers to move on and the lumber towns were abandoned.

A thriving ginseng business was once prominent in the economy of Vernon County. The root of the plant was widely used by Chinese people to cure and ward off various types of disease. Residents of the area harvested the naturally growing ginseng and sold it at market in Woodstock, Illinois. For a time Vernon County was the greatest producer of ginseng in the United States.

The protection of what became Wildcat Mountain State Park started off in 1938 when a local man, Amos Saunders, donated 20 acres (8.1 ha) of land for the establishment of a park. The park grew to 60 acres (24 ha) in 1947 when it was acquired by the state of Wisconsin for a state park. The park, formally established in 1948, has since grown to a size of 3,643 acres (1,474 ha).

== Geology ==
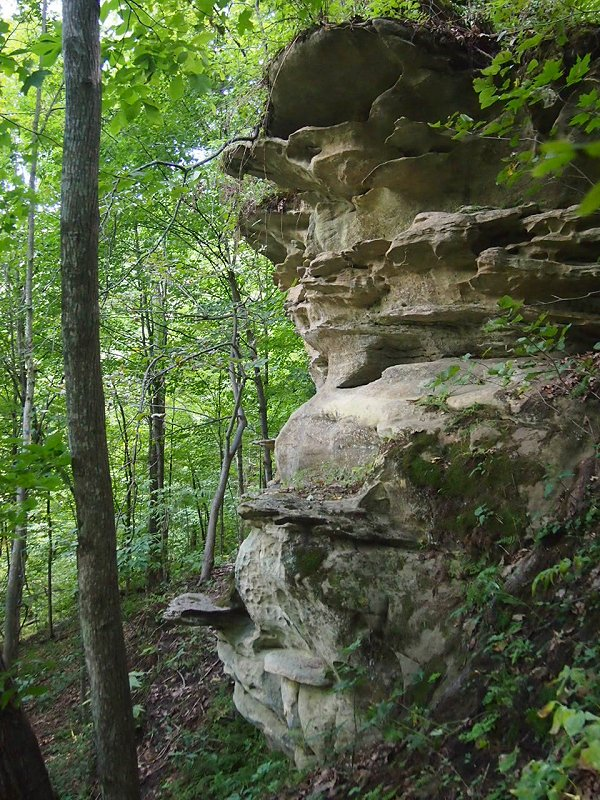
A sandstone outcrop on the flanks of Mount Pisgah

Wildcat Mountain State Park lies within the Driftless Area. This is an area of Wisconsin, Minnesota, Iowa and Illinois that was not covered by glaciers in the Last Ice Age. The term "driftless" indicates a lack of glacial drift, the material left behind by retreating continental glaciers. The hills of the Driftless Area are made of Precambrian sandstone that is topped with limestone. Overall the region is characterized by an eroded plateau with bedrock overlain by varying thicknesses of loess. Most characteristically, the river valleys are deeply dissected. The bluffs lining this reach of the Mississippi River drainage basin currently climb to not quite 600 feet (180 m).

== Ecology ==
Wildcat Mountain State Park has a woodland ecosystem. The Kickapoo River Valley and the park provide a habitat for many animals typically found in the woods of the Upper Midwest. Common birds include tundra swans, Canada geese, great blue herons, sandpipers, wild turkeys, red-tailed hawks, bald eagles and turkey vultures. Reptiles are also found in the park including, five-lined skinks, red-bellied snakes and eastern hog-nosed snakes. White-tailed deer, red squirrels, and beaver are among the mammals found in the park.

Mount Pisgah in Wildcat Mountain State Park has been preserved. It is covered with old-growth white pine and hemlock trees. The hill was never logged off by lumbermen and never grazed by the livestock of farmers in the area. The park is also home to ferns including maidenhair, interrupted and the unusual walking fern.

== Recreation ==
Wildcat Mountain State Park is open for year-round recreation. The Kickapoo River is known for its many miles of slow moving waters that flow through wild areas. The river attracts canoeing enthusiasts to the park. Canoeists can observe rare plants growing on the banks of the river and observe wildlife that live on the riverbanks including muskrats, belted kingfishers, green herons and great blue herons. Biologic surveys on the river have documented up to 46 species of fish. The Kickapoo has been designated a Class II trout stream. Brown trout spawn in tributaries of the river within the park.

Wildcat Mountain State Park has more than 20 miles (32 km) of trails that are open to hiking, snow shoeing, horseback riding and cross-country skiing. Additionally the park offers interpretative programs, an amphitheater, picnic facilities, stations for bird and wildlife viewing, and an outlook viewing the lower valley and Kickapoo River.
