= National Register of Historic Places listings in Iowa County, Iowa =

Location of Iowa County in Iowa

This is a list of the National Register of Historic Places listings in Iowa County, Iowa.

This is intended to be a complete list of the properties and districts on the National Register of Historic Places in Iowa County, Iowa, United States. Latitude and longitude coordinates are provided for many National Register properties and districts; these locations may be seen together in a map.

There are 11 properties and districts listed on the National Register in the county, including 1 National Historic Landmark.

This National Park Service list is complete through NPS recent listings posted March 21, 2025.

== Current listings ==
	Name on the Register	Image	Date listed	Location	City or town	Description
1	Amana Villages	Amana Villages	October 15, 1966 (#66000336)	Northeastern Iowa County; 41°47′59″N 91°55′15″W	Middle Amana	
2	E.J. Baird House		February 25, 1982 (#82002622)	Jackson and Fremont Sts. 41°34′21″N 92°09′31″W	Millersburg	
3	David and M. Maria Hughes House	David and M. Maria Hughes House	June 28, 1996 (#96000697)	101 W. Penn St. 41°39′34″N 92°00′27″W	Williamsburg	
4	Indian Fish Weir		July 21, 1988 (#88001122)	Address Restricted	Middle Amana	The Amana Indian fish weir is believed to have been covered over by river silt, and is no longer visible.
5	Iowa County Courthouse	Iowa County Courthouse	July 2, 1981 (#81000247)	Court Ave. 41°47′53″N 92°04′14″W	Marengo	
6	Ladora Savings Bank	Ladora Savings Bank	August 3, 1990 (#90001196)	811 Pacific St. 41°45′17″N 92°11′01″W	Ladora	
7	Lenox Township Church of the New Jerusalem	Lenox Township Church of the New Jerusalem	September 29, 1983 (#83000370)	South of Norway; 41°50′50″N 91°55′41″W	Lenox Township	
8	Pilot Grove	Pilot Grove	November 17, 1977 (#77000519)	Southwest of Williamsburg; 41°37′49″N 92°05′03″W	Williamsburg	
9	Plagmann Round Barn	Plagmann Round Barn	June 30, 1986 (#86001440)	Off Iowa Highway 209; 41°43′30″N 92°03′11″W	Conroy	
10	St. Michael's Church, Cemetery, Rectory and Ancient Order of Hibernians Hall	St. Michael's Church, Cemetery, Rectory and Ancient Order of Hibernians Hall	January 20, 1983 (#83000371)	East of Parnell on F 52; 41°35′24″N 91°54′48″W	Parnell	
11	Fred G. Turner House	Fred G. Turner House	June 27, 1985 (#85001381)	Iowa Highway 149; 41°33′25″N 92°03′56″W	North English	

== See also ==
- List of National Historic Landmarks in Iowa
- National Register of Historic Places listings in Iowa
- Listings in neighboring counties: Benton, Johnson, Keokuk, Linn, Poweshiek, Tama, Washington
