= List of Iowa State Preserves =

Iowa State Preserves tend to be small parcels of land with some historic or environmental significance. The arrangement is alphabetic. This is based on information found at a website maintained by the Iowa Department of Natural Resources.

- A.F. Miller State Preserve
- Ames High Prairie State Preserve
- Anderson Prairie State Preserve
- Behrens Pond and Woodlands State Preserve
- Berry Woods State Preserve
- Bird Hill State Preserve
- Bixby State Preserve
- Bluffton Fir Stand State Preserve
- Brush Creek Canyon State Preserve
- Brushy Creek State Preserve
- Cameron Woods State Preserve
- Casey's Paha State Preserve
- Catfish Creek State Preserve
- Cayler Prairie State Preserve
- Cedar Bluffs State Preserve
- Cedar Hills Sand Prairie State Preserve
- Cheever Lake State Preserve
- Clay Prairie State Preserve
- Claybanks Forest State Preserve
- Cold Water Spring State Preserve
- Crossman Prairie State Preserve
- Decorah Ice Cave State Preserve
- Dinesen Prairie State Preserve
- Doolittle Prairie State Preserve
- Fallen Rock State Preserve
- Fish Farm Mounds State Preserve
- Five Ridge Prairie State Preserve
- Fleming Woods State Preserve
- Fort Atkinson State Preserve
- Freda Haffner Kettlehole State Preserve
- Gitchie Manitou State Preserve
- Hanging Bog State Preserve
- Hardin City Woodland State Preserve
- Hartley Fort State Preserve
- Hayden Prairie State Preserve
- Hoffman Prairie State Preserve
- Indian Bluffs Primitive Area State Preserve
- Indian Fish Trap State Preserve
- Kalsow Prairie State Preserve
- Kish-Ke-Kosh Prairie State Preserve
- Lamson Woods State Preserve
- Liska-Stanek Prairie State Preserve
- Little Maquoketa River Mounds State Preserve
- Malanaphy Springs State Preserve
- Malchow Mounds State Preserve
- Manikowski Prairie State Preserve
- Mann Wilderness Area State Preserve
- Marietta Sand Prairie State Preserve
- Mericle Woods State Preserve
- Merrill A. Stainbrook State Preserve
- Merritt Forest State Preserve
- Montauk State Preserve
- Mossy Glen State Preserve
- Mount Pisgah Cemetery State Preserve
- Mount Talbot State Preserve
- Nestor Stiles Prairie State Preserve
- Ocheyedan Mound State Preserve
- Old State Quarry State Preserve
- Palisades-Downs State Preserve
- Pecan Grove State Preserve
- Pellett Woods State Preserve
- Pilot Grove State Preserve
- Pilot Knob State Preserve
- Retz Woods State Preserve
- Roberts Creek State Preserve
- Rock Creek Island State Preserve
- Rock Island State Preserve
- Roggman Boreal Slopes State Preserve
- Rolling Thunder Prairie State Preserve
- Saint James Lutheran Church State Preserve
- Savage Woods State Preserve
- Searryl's Cave State Preserve
- Sheeder Prairie State Preserve
- Silver Lake Fen State Preserve
- Silvers-Smith Woods State Preserve
- Slinde Mounds State Preserve
- Starr's Cave State Preserve
- Steele Prairie State Preserve
- Stinson Prairie State Preserve
- Strasser Woods State Preserve
- Sylvan Runkel State Preserve
- Toolesboro Mounds State Preserve
- Turin Loess Hills State Preserve
- Turkey River Mounds State Preserve
- White Pine Hollow State Preserve
- Williams Prairie State Preserve
- Wittrock Indian Village State Preserve
- Woodland Mounds State Preserve
- Woodman Hollow State Preserve
- Woodthrush State Preserve
