= List of National Natural Landmarks in Iowa =

There are 7 National Natural Landmarks in Iowa.

Iowa National Natural Landmarks (clickable map)

Name	Image	Date	Location	County	Ownership	Description
Anderson Goose Lake		1975	42°18′56″N 93°37′26″W	Iowa	Private	One of the few essentially natural glacial pothole lakes remaining in Iowa.
Cayler Prairie		1965	43°23′50″N 95°14′38″W	Dickinson	State	An example of the increasingly rare virgin prairie grassland.
Cold Water Cave		1987	43°26′28″N 91°57′37″W	Winneshiek	Private	An exceptional example of an extensive cave system well decorated with speleothems.
Dewey's Pasture and Smith's Slough		1975	43°11′33″N 94°55′45″W	Clay, Palo Alto	State	Pothole lakes created during the last glacial epoch.
Hayden Prairie State Preserve		1965	43°26′22″N 92°22′59″W	Howard	State	A true prairie remnant.
Loess Hills		1986	41°48′05″N 95°59′42″W	Harrison, Monona	State, private	The best examples of loess topography in the Missouri River Bluffs region.
White Pine Hollow State Forest		1967	42°37′47″N 91°06′43″W	Dubuque	State	The only known remaining white pine tract in Iowa.

== See also ==
- List of National Historic Landmarks in Iowa
