= White Pine Hollow State Forest =

State forest in Dubuque County, Iowa

- Location within Iowa Location within the United States
- Location: Dubuque County, Iowa, United States
- Nearest city: Luxemburg, Iowa
- Coordinates: 42°37′47″N 91°06′43″W
- Area: 944 acres (382 ha)
- Elevation: 700 feet (210 m)
- Administrator: Iowa Department of Natural Resources
- Website: Official website

U.S. National Natural Landmark
- Designated: 1967

White Pine Hollow State Forest is a 944-acre (382 ha) forested area in Dubuque County, Iowa, United States. Of the forest, a 712-acre (288 ha) tract is a National Natural Landmark and Iowa State Preserve. The state forest is named after its dominant old-growth tree, the white pine. The grove is said to be the only old-growth patch of white pines still growing in Iowa. The nearest town of any size is Luxemburg.

Formerly known as: "Pine Creek Hollow," and "Pine Hollow".

== Ecology ==
The Dubuque region is relatively far south for the white pine to thrive. White Pine Hollow, part of the Driftless Area, is a patch of north-facing algific talus slope land, a subset of dolomite karstland with many sinkholes, caverns, and other sharp changes in elevation. The conifer population may have established itself here at a time when the climate of Iowa was colder than it is today, and this grove could be a relict of what was once a much larger population.

White Pine Hollow contains over 625 species of plants. Two endangered species of animals, the Indiana bat and the Iowa Pleistocene snail, have been observed here. One threatened species of plant, the northern wild monkshood, has also been observed growing here.

== Status ==
The White Pine Hollow State Forest and Preserve was designated as a state forest in 1934, listed as an Iowa State Preserve in 1968, and listed as a National Natural Landmark in 1967.
