= Driftless Area National Wildlife Refuge =

National Wildlife Refuge of the United States in Illinois, Iowa, and Wisconsin

Coordinates: 42°41′00″N 91°07′30″W

- IUCN category IV (habitat/species management area)
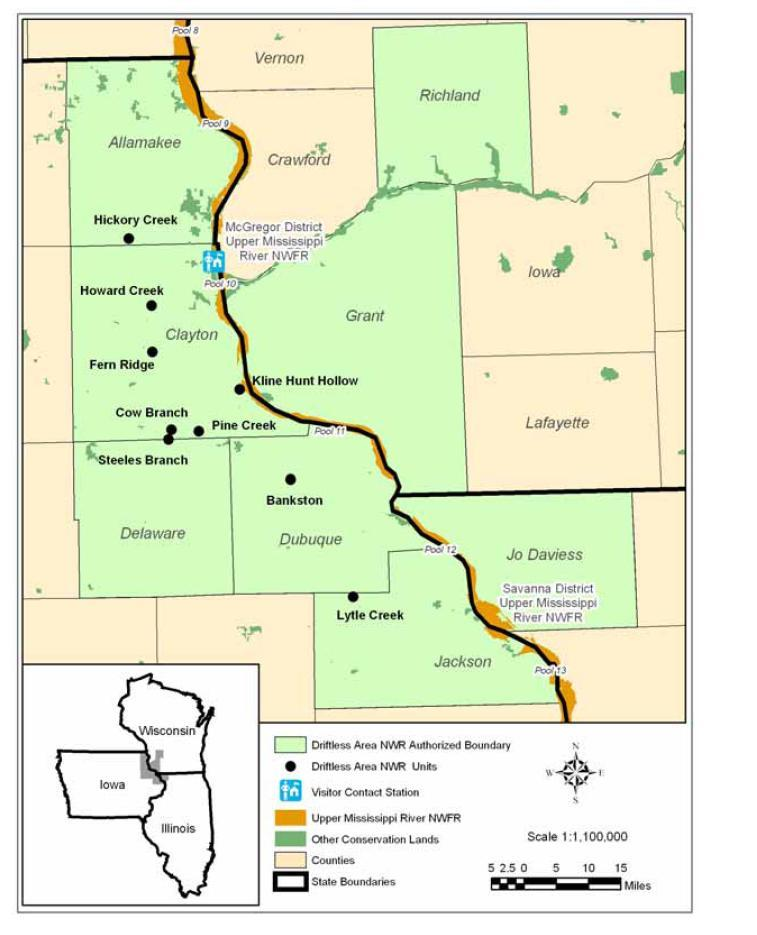
- Driftless Area National Wildlife Refuge units
- Interactive map of Driftless Area National Wildlife Refuge
- Location: United States
- Nearest city: Dubuque, Iowa
- Area: 811.99 acres (328.60 ha)
- Established: 1989
- Governing body: U.S. Fish and Wildlife Service
- Website: Driftless Area National Wildlife Refuge

Driftless Area National Wildlife Refuge is a United States National Wildlife Refuge in northeastern Iowa. It is a collection of non-contiguous parcels in the vicinity of the Upper Mississippi River National Wildlife and Fish Refuge.

The refuge was established in 1989 to help the recovery of two federally listed species: the endangered Iowa Pleistocene Snail and threatened plant Northern Wild Monkshood. Although the refuge was established to protect the snail and flower, an entire rare community of plants and animals is preserved on these sites. The U.S. Fish and Wildlife Service manages the refuge as part of the National Wildlife Refuge system. Currently, the refuge consists of nine sites totaling 811.99 acres (328.60 ha) in four counties of Iowa only. In descending order of land area they are Clayton, Dubuque, Jackson, and Allamakee counties.

== Geology ==
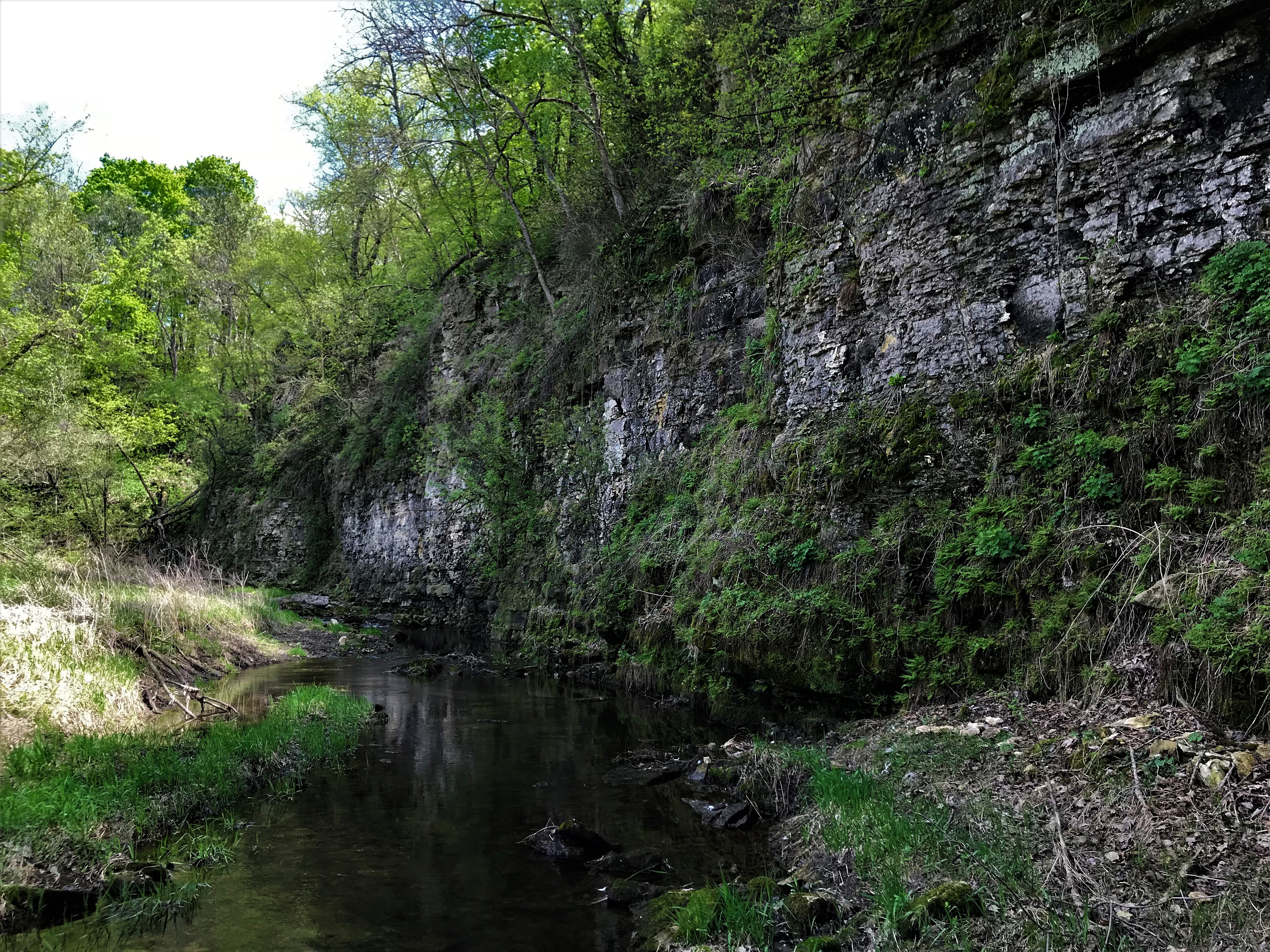
Algific talus slopes along Howard Creek at Driftless Area National Wildlife Refuge, May 2018

Iowa Pleistocene Snail, Discus macclintocki

Portions of Iowa, Wisconsin, Minnesota and Illinois contain unusual geology. The karst region, referred to as the "Driftless Area", escaped the last glaciers leaving the Paleozoic-age bedrock subject to erosion. In addition to the curious topography of steep slopes and cliffs, there are unique habitats. Certain slopes, usually north facing, are covered with a talus layer that allows ice-cooled air to exit from underground cracks and fissures. Upland sinkholes contribute to the air flow regime and are an important component of a unique system called an algific talus slopes, meaning a cold producing rocky slope. Even on a midsummer day when the outside air temperature is 90 °F (32 °C), ground temperatures on these slopes range from 42 °F (6 °C) to about 55 °F (13 °C). Although the slopes will freeze in winter, the temperatures are moderated. These slopes remain cool throughout the year and are home to rare species of plants and animals.

== Chilled air ==
In the summer, air is drawn down through sinkholes, flows over very cold groundwater and is released out vents on the slopes. Summer temperatures on the slopes range from 42 °F (6 °C) to 55 °F (13 °C). In winter, the air is drawn into the vents, and the groundwater again freezes. Because of the cool temperatures and moist conditions, unusual plants for this part of the country grow on the slopes. Typically growing in a colder more northern climate, yews, balsam fir, Showy lady's slipper and golden saxifrage can be found on the cool slopes. These cold microclimates of the slopes allow the rare plants and animals to survive.

== Fossil snail ==
A tiny land snail, the Iowa Pleistocene snail, is smaller than a shirt button, at about 5 millimeters (1/4 inch) in diameter. Considered a glacial relict species, it has survived only on these small areas where temperature, moisture and food are suitable. The snail was known only from fossil records and thought to be extinct until 1955, when a scientist discovered it alive in leaf litter in northeast Iowa, eating birch and maple leaves. Because of the fragile nature of the habitat and the small size of the total population, this snail was placed on the federal endangered species list. The primary recovery option for the tiny snail is permanent protection of remaining colonies. Thirty-six known colonies are currently in northeast Iowa with one population occurring in northwest Illinois.

== Threatened buttercup ==
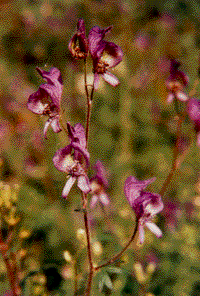
Northern monkshood

The threatened Northern Wild Monkshood, belonging to the buttercup family, grows on 114 algific talus slopes and similar cool moist habitats in Iowa, Wisconsin, Ohio and New York. The majority of the sites are in Iowa. The purple hood-shaped flower, an adaptation for bumble bee pollination, was listed as threatened in 1978. Its options for recovery are similar to the snail.

== Habitat status ==
There are over 300 algific talus slopes but some are in poor condition. Anything disrupting the air flow through sinkholes and out the vents can affect the habitat. In the past, the impacts of logging, grazing, road building, quarries, agricultural runoff, and sinkhole filling reduced the number of algific talus slopes. Today, these habitats are still threatened by logging, grazing, agricultural runoff, and sinkhole filling activities and invasive species like garlic mustard.

== Refuge locations ==
The 812-acre (3.29 km^{2}) refuge currently consists of scattered tracts in northeast Iowa ranging from a few acres to a few hundred acres. Land acquisition from willing sellers is ongoing. Restoration of forest or prairie habitat is conducted on the land surrounding algific talus slopes and provides habitat for a variety of wildlife including white-tailed deer, wild turkeys, bald eagles, American woodcock, woodpeckers and a variety of songbirds. States, counties, and private organizations like The Nature Conservancy also help protect algific talus slopes. Private landowners are perhaps the most significant stewards of remaining algific talus slopes. The Fish and Wildlife Service contacts land owners whose properties have these habitats and offers assistance in managing them.

The Refuge is managed from McGregor, Iowa, where tours can be arranged. Fishing and White-tailed deer hunting are permitted in a small number of units.

== See also ==
- Bixby State Preserve

== Sources ==
- FWS overview and planning document, Retrieved July 24, 2007
- "Driftless Area National Wildlife Refuge (Fish and Wildlife Service)". Archived from the original on June 9, 2007.* Retrieved on July 20, 2007
- FWS site giving further information Retrieved July 7, 2007
- FWS visitor information Retrieved July 7, 2007
- Recreation.gov site
- FWS Conservation plan Retrieved on June 8, 2007
- Friends of the Upper Mississippi Retrieved on June 8, 2007
