= Roberts Creek State Preserve =

Preserve in Iowa, United States

Coordinates: 42.916°N 91.384°W

Roberts Creek State Preserve is located in rural Clayton County, Iowa, in Wagner Township, near St. Olaf, Iowa, and a few miles north of Elkader, Iowa. Roberts Creek is a tributary of the Turkey River.

The Preserve contains algific talus slopes, a rare ecosystem unique to the Driftless Area and hosts a threatened wildflower.

The preserve is not open to the public, in that it is a rare ecosystem that contains a threatened species, Aconitum noveboracense, also known as Northern Blue Monkshood or Northern Wild Monkshood, a saxifrage, (a buttercup).
