= Luxemburg, Iowa =

City in Iowa

- City
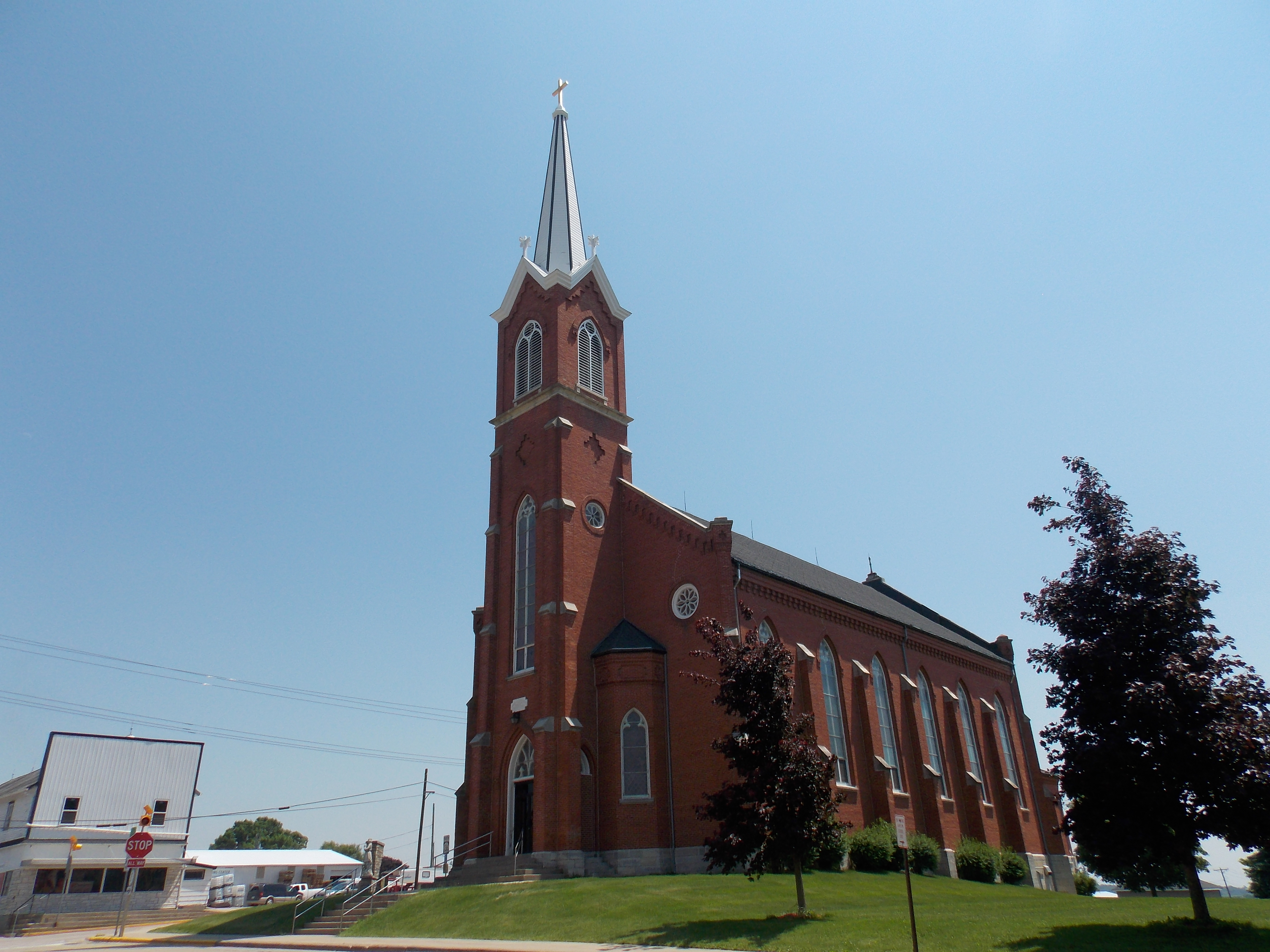
- Holy Trinity Catholic Church

- Location of Luxemburg, Iowa
- Coordinates: 42°36′15″N 91°04′21″W
- Country: United States
- State: Iowa
- County: Dubuque
- Established: 1912

Government
  - Type: Mayor-Council Democracy
  - Mayor: Rodger Oberbroeckling

Area
  - Total: 0.47 sq mi (1.22 km^{2})
  - Land: 0.47 sq mi (1.22 km^{2})
  - Water: 0 sq mi (0.00 km^{2})
- Elevation: 1,152 ft (351 m)

Population (2020)
  - Total: 245
  - Density: 519.4/sq mi (200.53/km^{2})
- Time zone: UTC-6 (Central (CST))
  - Summer (DST): UTC-5 (CDT)
- Zip Code: 52056
- Area code: 563
- FIPS code: 19-47460
- GNIS feature ID: 2395788
- Website: https://www.luxemburgiowa.com/

Luxemburg is a city in Dubuque County, Iowa, United States. It is part of the Dubuque, Iowa Metropolitan Statistical Area. The population was 245 at the time of the 2020 census, down from 246 in 2000. The White Pine Hollow State Forest is located four miles to the northwest of Luxemburg.

== Geography ==
According to the United States Census Bureau, the city has a total area of 0.46 square miles (1.19 km^{2}), all land.

== Demographics ==
Historical populations
Year	Pop.	±%
1920	93	—
1930	105	+12.9%
1940	124	+18.1%
1950	120	−3.2%
1960	159	+32.5%
1970	185	+16.4%
1980	271	+46.5%
1990	257	−5.2%
2000	246	−4.3%
2010	240	−2.4%
2020	245	+2.1%
Source:"U.S. Census website". United States Census Bureau. and Iowa Data Center; Source: U.S. Decennial Census

=== 2020 census ===
As of the census of 2020, there were 245 people, 101 households, and 82 families residing in the city. The population density was 519.4 inhabitants per square mile (200.5/km^{2}). There were 104 housing units at an average density of 220.5 per square mile (85.1/km^{2}). The racial makeup of the city was 97.1% White, 0.0% Black or African American, 0.0% Native American, 1.2% Asian, 0.0% Pacific Islander, 0.4% from other races and 1.2% from two or more races. Hispanic or Latino persons of any race comprised 1.2% of the population.

Of the 101 households, 31.7% of which had children under the age of 18 living with them, 65.3% were married couples living together, 5.0% were cohabitating couples, 18.8% had a female householder with no spouse or partner present and 10.9% had a male householder with no spouse or partner present. 18.8% of all households were non-families. 14.9% of all households were made up of individuals, 10.9% had someone living alone who was 65 years old or older.

The median age in the city was 44.5 years. 24.9% of the residents were under the age of 20; 5.3% were between the ages of 20 and 24; 20.0% were from 25 and 44; 22.4% were from 45 and 64; and 27.3% were 65 years of age or older. The gender makeup of the city was 51.0% male and 49.0% female.

=== 2010 census ===
As of the census of 2010, there were 240 people, 100 households, and 74 families living in the city. The population density was 521.7 inhabitants per square mile (201.4/km^{2}). There were 103 housing units at an average density of 223.9 per square mile (86.4/km^{2}). The racial makeup of the city was 100.0% White. Hispanic or Latino of any race were 1.7% of the population.

There were 100 households, of which 28.0% had children under the age of 18 living with them, 68.0% were married couples living together, 2.0% had a female householder with no husband present, 4.0% had a male householder with no wife present, and 26.0% were non-families. 25.0% of all households were made up of individuals, and 13% had someone living alone who was 65 years of age or older. The average household size was 2.40 and the average family size was 2.86.

The median age in the city was 44 years. 23.3% of residents were under the age of 18; 4.3% were between the ages of 18 and 24; 23% were from 25 to 44; 28% were from 45 to 64; and 21.7% were 65 years of age or older. The gender makeup of the city was 51.3% male and 48.8% female.

=== 2000 census ===
As of the census of 2000, there were 246 people, 92 households, and 72 families living in the city. The population density was 540.2 inhabitants per square mile (208.6/km^{2}). There were 94 housing units at an average density of 206.4 per square mile (79.7/km^{2}). The racial makeup of the city was 100.00% White.

There were 92 households, out of which 31.5% had children under the age of 18 living with them, 70.7% were married couples living together, 4.3% had a female householder with no husband present, and 21.7% were non-families. 20.7% of all households were made up of individuals, and 12.0% had someone living alone who was 65 years of age or older. The average household size was 2.67 and the average family size was 3.10.

In the city, the population was spread out, with 27.6% under the age of 18, 6.1% from 18 to 24, 27.2% from 25 to 44, 18.7% from 45 to 64, and 20.3% who were 65 years of age or older. The median age was 39 years. For every 100 females, there were 100.0 males. For every 100 females age 18 and over, there were 100.0 males.

The median income for a household in the city was $35,833, and the median income for a family was $46,667. Males had a median income of $26,042 versus $19,643 for females. The per capita income for the city was $15,314. None of the population or families were below the poverty line.

== Education ==
Residents are within the Western Dubuque Community School District. Zoned schools include Farley Elementary School in Farley, Drexler Middle School in Farley, and Western Dubuque High School in Epworth.
