= Kimball Village =

- U.S. National Register of Historic Places
- U.S. National Historic Landmark
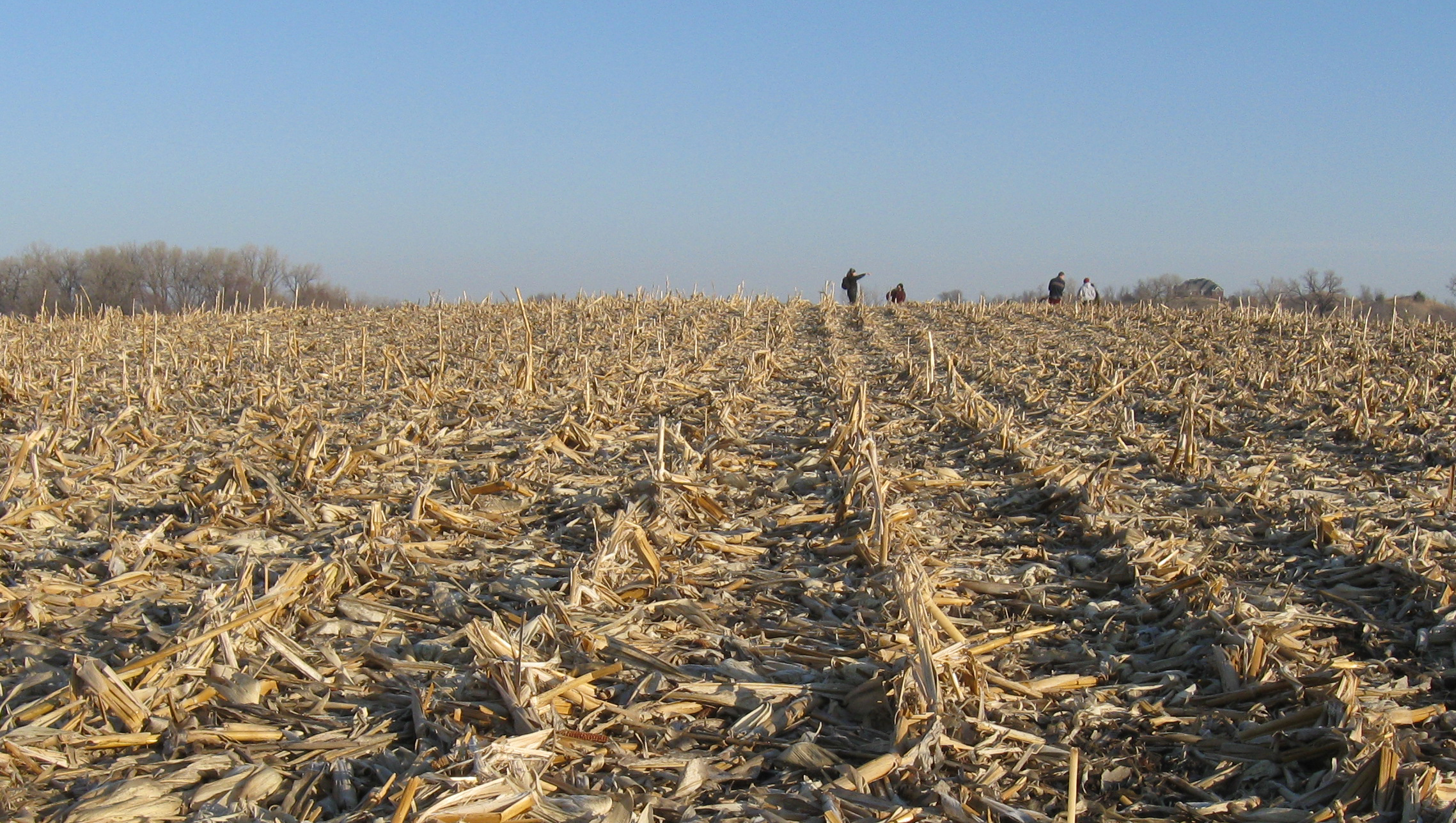
- Location: Address restricted
- Nearest city: Westfield, Iowa
- Area: 1.9 acres (0.77 ha)
- MPS: Archaeological Resources of Initial Variant of the Middle Missouri Tradition in Iowa MPS
- NRHP reference No.: 10000343

Significant dates
- Added to NRHP: June 11, 2010
- Designated NHL: December 23, 2016

Kimball Village is an archaeological site located in the vicinity of Westfield, Iowa, United States. It is one of six known Big Sioux phase villages from the Middle Missouri tradition that existed between 1100 and 1250 C.E. The site, located on a terrace overlooking the Big Sioux River, has well-preserved features, including earth lodge and storage pits, and evidence of fortifaction. The site was listed on the National Register of Historic Places in 2010, and as a National Historic Landmark in 2016.

== Description ==
Kimball Village is located in northwestern Iowa, in rural Plymouth County. It is set on a terrace set between the Big Sioux River and the Loess Hills. The site is identifiable as a mound rising in the floodplain, and occupies an area of just under 2 acres (0.81 ha).

Charles R. Keyes, a professor at Cornell College in Iowa, his assistant Ellison Orr, and 14 workers from the Works Progress Administration first excavated the site in 1939, after Keyes heard that artifact hunters were finding objects in this area. They discovered houses, hearths, storage pits, burial features, and over 9,000 artifacts. Other excavations have been done in 1942, 1963 and 2009, the latter determining the full extent of the site. These investigations revealed that the village had at least 20 dwellings organized in five rows facing south. It was fortified by a timber palisade and possibly also a ditch. As of its designation as a National Historic Landmark in 2016, the site was described as remarkably well preserved, having suffered little erosion damage. Only 3% of its area had been investigated by archaeologists.

== See also ==
- National Register of Historic Places listings in Plymouth County, Iowa
- List of National Historic Landmarks in Iowa
