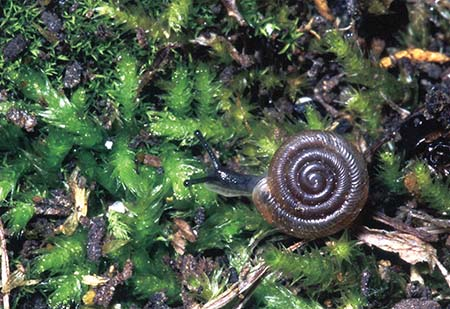

Conservation status
- Least Concern (IUCN 3.1)

- Critically Imperiled (NatureServe)
- Endangered (ESA)

Scientific classification
- Kingdom: Animalia
- Phylum: Mollusca
- Class: Gastropoda
- Order: Stylommatophora
- Family: Discidae
- Genus: Discus
- Species: D. macclintocki

Binomial name
- Discus macclintocki (F. C. Baker, 1928)
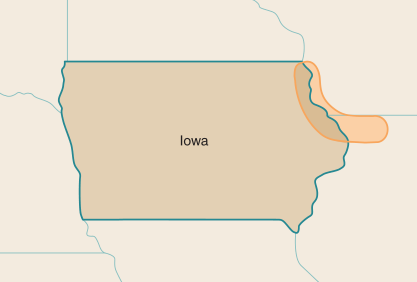
- Distribution of Iowa Pleistocene Snail (Discus macclintocki)

= Discus macclintocki =

Species of gastropod

Discus macclintocki is a species of land snail in the family Discidae known commonly as the Iowa Pleistocene snail and Pleistocene disc. It occurs in Iowa and Illinois in the United States. It is a federally listed endangered species.

== Biology ==
This snail is limited to patches of algific talus slope habitat. It is a relict species from the last ice age. Much of its remaining habitat is located on the Driftless Area National Wildlife Refuge in Iowa. Known from fossil evidence about 400,000 years old, it is one of many glacial relict species that remain in the Driftless Area, a glacier-eroded plateau that now makes up parts of Iowa, Illinois, Minnesota, and Wisconsin. Much of the area was covered by glaciers about 500,000 years ago, while parts of the Driftless Area were unglaciated.

The algific talus slope habitat that harbors the snail is a landscape cooled by air and water emerging from masses of subterranean ice. The ground temperature rarely exceeds 10 °C (50 °F), even in summer. Here the snail feeds on leaf litter from trees (mainly birch, maple and dogwood) and shrubs. During the winter, it burrows underground and becomes dormant. It breeds from March to August, laying two to six eggs in the litter. Juveniles emerge in about 28 days. The life span of the snail is 5 to 7 years. The adult is about 5–8 millimeters wide, with a brownish or greenish shell.

== Conservation status ==
The Iowa Pleistocene snail was thought to be extinct until it was discovered in 1955 by a scientist working in northeastern Iowa. It was listed as endangered by the United States in 1978. The main cause of the snail's decline is climate change, as it is restricted to patches of cold habitat in warmer surroundings. The snail is considered to be a relic of the ice age. About 75% of this snail's original habitat has been destroyed since 1850. Other causes include loss of habitat to logging, quarrying, livestock, pesticides, the construction of roads, and predation by shrews.

The International Union for Conservation of Nature assessed the snail as a species of least concern for the Red List, because its populations are apparently stable and none were lost in the decade prior to the assessment.

== Driftless Area National Wildlife Refuge ==
The 775-acre (3.14 km^{2}) Driftless Area National Wildlife Refuge was established in 1989 to protect native flora and fauna, including endangered and threatened species such as the Iowa Pleistocene snail. The refuge conserves the algific talus slope habitat and other local habitat such as cold, moist sinkholes.

Other glacial relict snails occur on the refuge, including the Midwest Pleistocene vertigo (Vertigo hubrichti).

Rare plants include the northern blue monkshood (Aconitum noveboracense), which thrives in the same cool talus habitat as the snail.
