= Lenox Township Church of the New Jerusalem =

- U.S. National Register of Historic Places
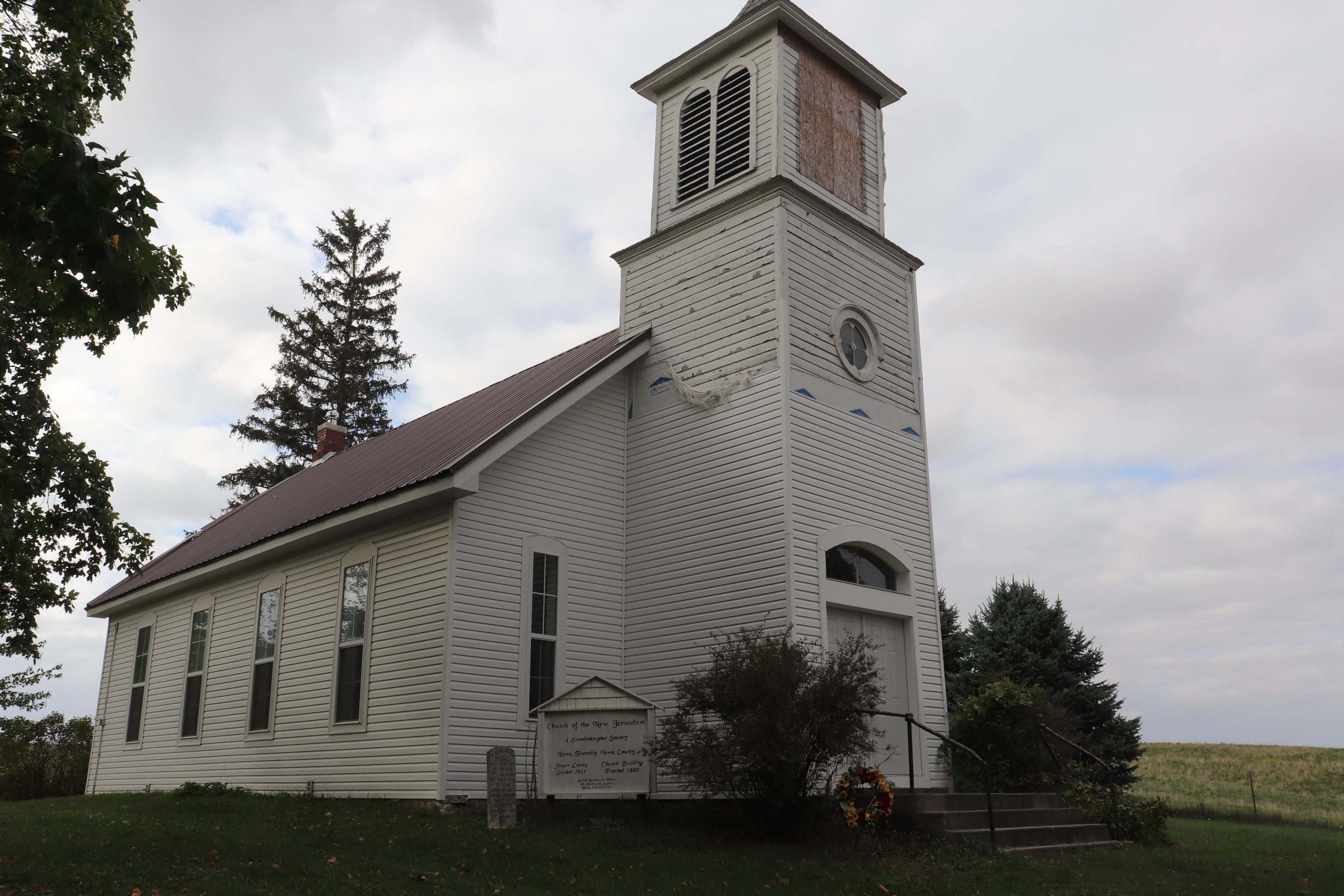

- Location within Iowa Location within the United States
- Location: South of Norway
- Coordinates: 41°50′50″N 91°55′41″W
- Area: less than one acre
- Built: 1880
- Built by: Mr. Wagner
- Architect: Rev. Gerald Busman
- NRHP reference No.: 83000370
- Added to NRHP: September 29, 1983

Lenox Township Church of the New Jerusalem is a historic church in Lenox Township, Iowa County, Iowa, United States. It is the only Swedenborgian church in Iowa.

The Jasper Colony was formed in St. Louis in 1851 and sent agents to Iowa to find a new home. The property was bought in what would become Lenox Township and each dwelling housed two families. A communal kitchen and dining hall was built to serve the community. A log cabin was built to house religious meetings that were led by Herman H. Diekhoner, who had organized the colony. The twenty families that formed the colony rejected communal ownership in early 1853, and the property was distributed among the settlers. Diekhoner left at that time. A New Church Sunday school was established in 1857, and a building was completed in 1859. All religious activities were held in the new building until this church building was built in 1880. It became the focal point for 35 other groups in Iowa, but none of the others built a church building. Annual meetings were held here that brought them together. After 1901 membership started to decline. While it continued to hold statewide reunions yearly, it is no longer considered an active congregation. The church building was added to the National Register of Historic Places in 1983.

The frame structure was designed by the Rev. Gerald Busman and built by a Mr. Wagner. The vernacular church building measures 40 by 28 feet (12.2 by 8.5 m). It features a gable roof and a square-based bell tower that projects from the east front. The tower is capped with a pyramid-shaped spire. Four narrow flat-arched windows line both sides of the structure.
