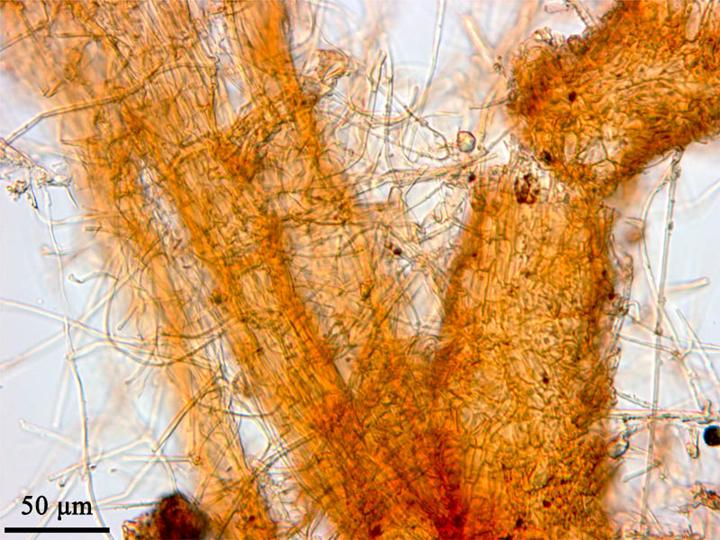

Scientific classification
- Kingdom: Fungi
- Division: Ascomycota
- Class: Pezizomycetes
- Order: Pezizales
- Family: Rhizinaceae
- Genus: Phymatotrichopsis
- Species: P. omnivora

Binomial name
- Phymatotrichopsis omnivora (Duggar) Hennebert, (1973)

Synonyms
- Ozonium auricomum Link [as 'auriconum'], (1809); Ozonium omnivorum Shear, (1907); Phymatotrichum omnivorum Duggar, (1916)

= Texas root rot =

Pathogenic fungus

Texas root rot (also known as Phymatotrichopsis root rot, Phymatotrichum root rot, cotton root rot, or, in the older literature, Ozonium root rot) is a disease that is fairly common in Mexico and the southwestern United States resulting in sudden wilt and death of affected plants, usually during the warmer months. It is caused by a soil-borne fungus named Phymatotrichopsis omnivora that attacks the roots of susceptible plants. It was first discovered in 1888 by Pammel and later named by Duggar in 1916.

A monograph of this disease, which includes a historical review, was written by R.B. Streets and H.E. Bloss in 1973.

== Host and symptoms ==
Phymatotrichopsis omnivora is a necrotrophic fungal pathogen that has a very broad host range, attacking almost 2000 dicotyledonous species. It inhabits alkaline, calcareous soils in southwestern United States. It particularly targets dicots as most monocots are immune. Economically important plant hosts affected by the pathogen include: peanuts, cotton, alfalfa, apple, pecans, and ornamental trees.

First symptom of disease is often chlorosis of the leaves then followed by browning and wilting. Two weeks after the first symptoms appear, the plant dies. In the field, infected cotton plants exhibit wilting in the mid to late summer form large circular patches and later die. Upon closer examination, the host plant's vascular system show extensive discoloration. Beneath the soil surface, other observable signs are present. Distinctive cruciform branched hyphae develop on infected root tissue which are observable with compound microscope (Figure 1). In addition, taproots of the infect plant are covered in mycelial strands.

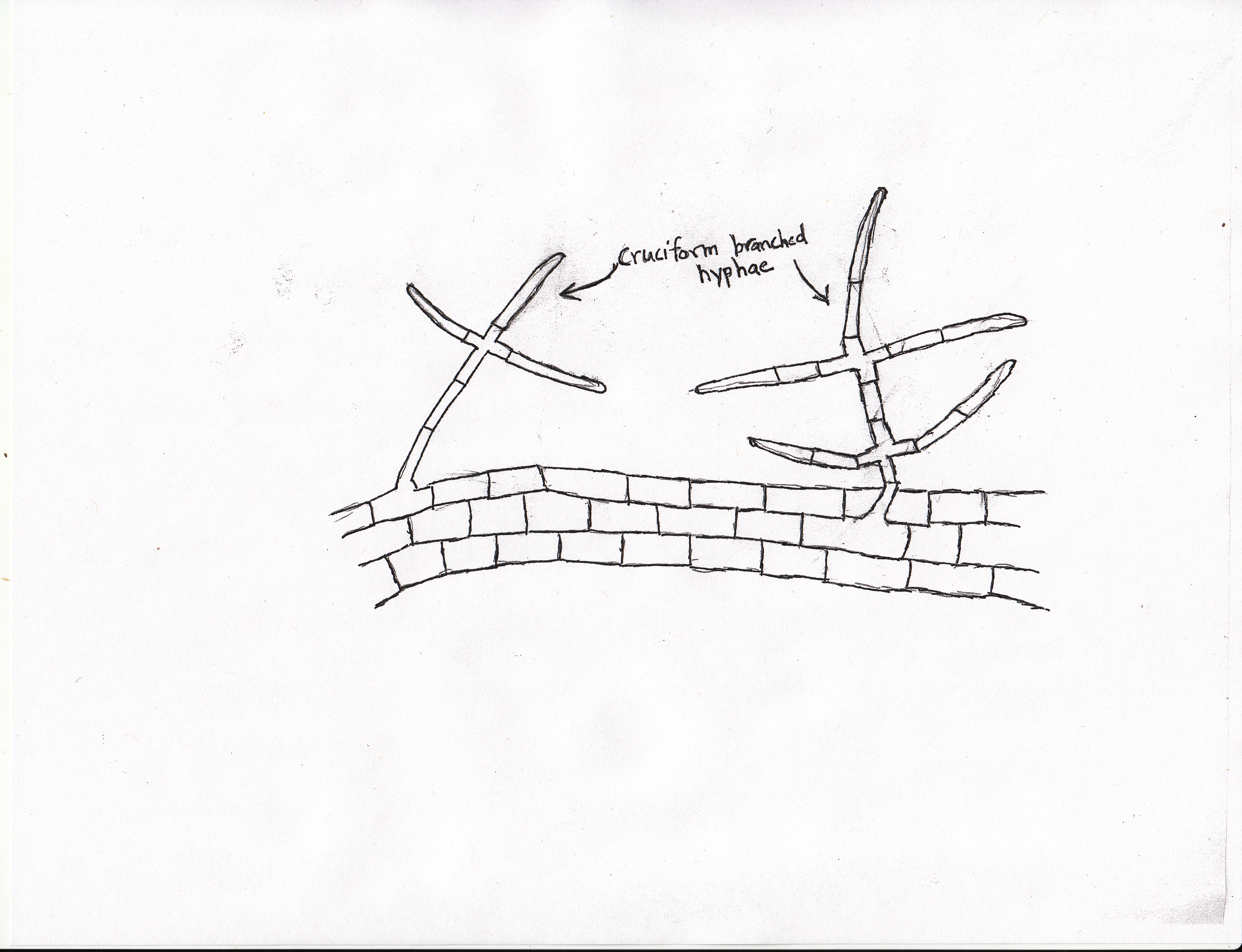
Figure 1: Cruciform hyphae is a unique sign observable using a compound microscope

Another macroscopic sign is tan and white spore mats developed on the soil surface near the infected plants during favorable high moisture environmental conditions. Despite the name, these spore mats are not known to aid in dispersal. Although presence of the conidial phase on the spore mats is known, the function of the conidia remains unknown since conidial germination is rarely observed.

== Environment ==
The highest concentrations of Texas root rot disease are found in the southwestern United States and northern Mexico, with cases also reported in India and Pakistan. Texas root rot is caused by a pathogen that prefers alkaline and calcareous soils (pH between 7-8.5), affording the potential for control via soil amendment. Scientific research has discovered that both high precipitation and high temperatures (below 93 °F (34 °C)) are further environmental enhancers for Texas root rot by increasing its virulence.

The pathogen earned its common name because of the geographical area where it is most prevalent, the cotton-growing region of Texas. Texas, an area located in the southern half of the United States, receives an annual rainfall between 127 centimetres (50 in) and less than 25 centimetres (10 in). Researchers collected data on Texas root rot virulence over 13 years at the Blackland Research Center using cotton plants infected with Texas root rot and found that virulence correlates somewhat with precipitation in the range of 36–100 centimetres (14–39 in) of rainfall. Higher virulence of Texas root rot was observed after large precipitation events. These experimental findings support the conclusion that Texas root rot preferentially develops in wet over dry soil conditions. The same study also found that virulence of Texas root rot develops inversely to air temperatures over 93 degrees Fahrenheit.

The symptoms of Texas root rot are most severe during hot summers when air temperature increases the average soil temperature over 80 °F (27 °C). The elevation in temperatures produces Texas root rot's most severe symptoms: wilting and bronze colored leaves. The pathogen is only active in the summer months when the high average temperatures can heat the soil microclimate one foot deep over 80 °F (27 °C).

TRR is a pathogen of quarantine concern for Ukraine.

== Disease cycle ==
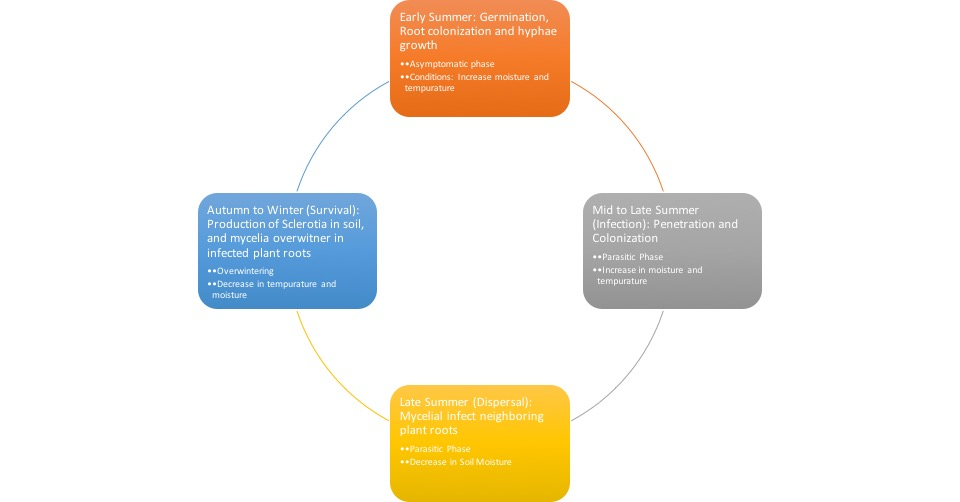
Figure 2: disease cycle

The disease overwinters as sclerotia or as mycelium on dead plant tissue. In spring to early summer, the germination phase begins with hyphae growth and root colonization. In middle and late summer, the disease reaches its infectious stage when associated symptoms are observed. The pathogen penetrates the host and colonize plant root tissue causing a root rot. This results in the first symptoms of the disease manifested by chlorotic leaves and eventually wilting. Root rot disease rings enlarge, and the field can be categorized into three zones based upon plant status: asymptomatic, disease front and survivor. The pathogen disseminates by infecting neighboring plants, with infected plant tissue serving as a secondary inoculum and further spreading the disease. In situations of high moisture, conidia are produced on spore mats but their role in dispersal is unknown since conidia rarely germinate.

P. omnivora forms several kinds of differentiated hyphae. Initially, hyphae emerge from sclerotia overwintering in soil. Sclerotia are the primary inoculum in affected fields. The emerging hyphae either infects the host root or form mycelial strands with a differentiated rind. Upon contact with host roots, P. omnivora forms a mycelial mantle on the root's surface. This leads to necrosis of epidermis and underlying cortical tissue, leading to root lesions. As the disease progresses, the roots are covered by the characteristic cinnamon-colored mycelial strands covered with acircular sterile hyphae, a diagnostic sign of Texas Root Rot. The roots at later stages of infection show extensive vascular discoloration due to root necrosis. The mycelial strands and symptom development in field-infected roots are especially conspicuous on cotton. During the late summer and fall, mycelial strands formed on the root surfaces or in the soil form sclerotia to survive the winter, thus completing the life cycle.

== Pathogenesis ==
As a soil borne pathogen, P. omnivora enters the plant host via the roots. It penetrates the host by growing infectious hyphae that cover the host plant root's epidermis and eventually infects epidermis and cortical cell junctions of plant host instead of having specialized penetration organs like an appressoria. From there the fungal pathogen infects root vascular system and begin cause cortical root lesions, which is most pronounced in cotton. Microarray analysis and gene expression profiling revealed that certain pathways related to plant defense such as jasmonic acid, ethylene, and flavonoid production were reduced at later infectious stages. This suggests that P. omnivora is able to suppress the production of these phytochemical defenses to ensure disease success.

== Control ==
The most common management strategy to limit the spread and damage produced by Texas root rot is soil manipulation. The goal of soil manipulation is to create a soil environment that is not favorable to Texas root rot to limit its activity. A common approach is to change the soil acidity/soil pH because the pathogen prefers alkaline soils. A recommended method to decrease soil pH is through the application of ammonium sulfate or ammonium phosphate fertilizer at around 4.5 kg (10 lb) per 9.3 m^{2} (100 sq ft). Applications of fertilizer in this manner causes the soil pH to decrease making it less favorable to Texas root rot disease which prefers a more basic soil environment. This management method is impracticable for any moderate or large scale agricultural operation because of the cost required to amend large areas of soil. However, it is well-suited for hobby gardens or other small scale operations.

Texas root displays a varied infection pattern so the most effective treatment plans contain a variety of management strategies. Other control methods for Texas root rot are deep plowing of the soil post-harvest, the establishment of protective plant barriers, and the incorporation of organic crop residues into the soil. Deep plowing after harvest breaks up potentially infected soil 6 to 10 inches (15 to 25 cm) deep and has been shown to combat Texas root rot by disrupting the pathogen’s ability to form sclerotia.

The planting of resistant grass crops, such as sorghum, to surround an already infected area can limit the spread of Texas root rot to other areas. By surrounding susceptible crops with immune grasses, a barrier layer in the soil can be created to block root infection of susceptible crops.

Organic amendments are an effective treatment against Texas root rot when applied to the soil before spring planting. The most effective amendment is composed of residues from wheat, oats, and other cereal crops. Though sources disagree, crop rotation is not an effective control method because of Texas root rot’s wide host range of over 2,000 host species. Overall, it is best to avoid areas known to suffer from the Texas root rot because no management technique is a guarantee to control the pathogen.

== Importance ==
Texas root rot (Phymatotrichopsis omnivora) is regarded as one of the most impactful diseases of woody dicotyledon plants in large part because of its wide array of dicotyledon host plants, featuring one of the largest host ranges of any known fungal pathogen with over 2,000 possible host species. Though Texas root rot has been studied since 1888, there are few effective management tools because of the unique biological characteristics of the pathogen. Namely, its ability to last virtually indefinitely in soil and its capacity to survive on roots of native vegetation without producing symptoms. The species' broad host range also makes management difficult because disease populations can be maintained across various host species.

Texas root rot presents a serious economic threat to cotton growers with losses of upwards of $29 million in cotton found in Texas as estimated by Texas A&M.
