= Pony Creek Park =

Park in Iowa, United States

- U.S. National Register of Historic Places
- U.S. National Historic Landmark
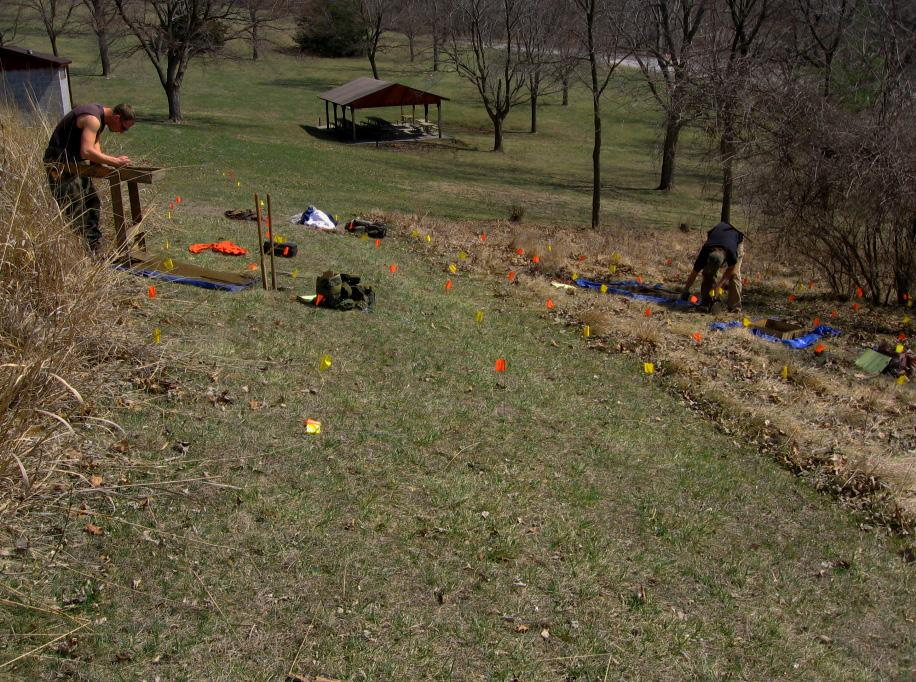
- Excavation of the Davis Oriole Lodge (undated National Park Service photo)

- Location within Iowa Location within the United States
- Nearest city: Glenwood, Iowa
- Coordinates: 41°4′16″N 95°47′12″W
- Area: 53 acres (21 ha)
- NRHP reference No.: 71000299
- Added to NRHP: July 30, 1971

Pony Creek Park is a park in Oak Township, Mills County, Iowa, United States, northwest of Glenwood. Centered around the 83-acre (34 ha) Pony Creek Lake, it offers boating, picnicking, and fishing areas. Other features of the park include woods, a camping area, virgin prairie, and a viewing area for the local loess topography.

The park cover 53 acres (21 ha), and is administered by Mills County. In 1971, it was listed on the National Register of Historic Places, because at the time it was known to contain at least two archaeologically important prehistoric Plains Indian earthen lodges, and the only ones in the region that were on public land that might be preserved.

== Davis Oriole Earthlodge ==
One of the lodges at the site, the Davis Oriole Earthlodge Site, was designated a National Historic Landmark in 2012; it is one of the best-preserved lodges known of this type. It was first discovered in 1991 by D.D. Davis, an amateur archaeologist. Due to mapping errors, it was not relocated until 2008, when it was found under one of the park's main trails. The lodge measures about 40 by 26 feet (12.2 m × 7.9 m), with its surface between 35 and 50 inches (89 and 127 cm) below the modern surface. The lodge underwent a careful and minimal excavation in 2009 to confirm its integrity, yielding information about its construction, and fragments of pottery used by its inhabitants. When the lodge was abandoned, it was apparently burned, collapsing its roof and charring its walls.

== See also ==
- List of National Historic Landmarks in Iowa
- National Register of Historic Places listings in Mills County, Iowa
