= Indian Village State Preserve =

- Indian Village Site (Witrock Area)
- U.S. National Register of Historic Places
- U.S. National Historic Landmark
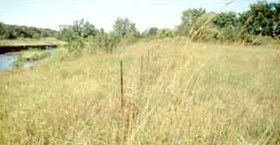

- Location within Iowa Location within the United States
- Location: Left bank of Waterman Creek, east of Sutherland
- Nearest city: Sutherland, Iowa
- Coordinates: 42°58′50″N 95°25′22″W
- NRHP reference No.: 66000888

Significant dates
- Added to NRHP: October 15, 1966
- Designated NHL: July 19, 1964

Indian Village State Preserve, or the Wittrock Indian Village State Preserve, is a state archaeological preserve near Sutherland, Iowa. The 6-acre (2.4 ha) property preserves the Indian Village Site (13OB4), a prehistoric fortified village of the Mill Creek culture. It was declared a National Historic Landmark in 1964, and made a state preserve in 1968. It is located east of Sutherland, south of 455th Street and west of Yellow Avenue. Access to the preserve requires crossing private land.

The site is located on a terrace overlooking Waterman Creek. It has yielded evidence of occupation for a roughly 300-year period around 1200 CE. The site was completely surrounded by a wooden stockade, probably for protection against other Native Americans. Within the bounds of the stockade there were about 20 lodges, partially subterranean structures about 20 by 30 feet (6.1 m × 9.1 m), which were accessed by entry tunnels. Each lodge had a fireplace and a storage pit.

The site was acquired by the state in 1937, and has been the subject of several excavations by professional archaeologists. It was first excavated by the state in 1965, at which time elements of the stockade and the character of the housing was identified. The site is subject to erosion, which the state has taken steps to mitigate by the installation of gabions on the creek bank. Materials from the site are archived at the University of Wisconsin in Madison, and at the state archaeological office. The state has installed a partial recreation of a stockade, to give an impression of what life might have been like in the village.

== See also ==
- List of National Historic Landmarks in Iowa
- National Register of Historic Places listings in O'Brien County, Iowa
- List of Iowa State Preserves
