= Louis Hermann Pammel =

American botanist (1862–1931)

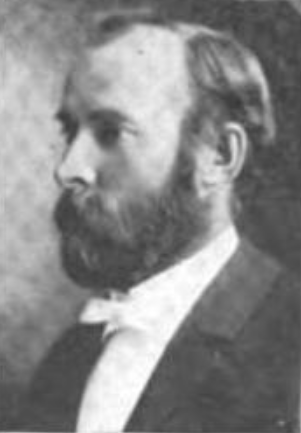
- Born: April 19, 1862; La Crosse, Wisconsin
- Died: March 23, 1931 (aged 68)
- Education: University of Wisconsin–Madison Washington University in St. Louis
- Scientific career
- Fields: Botany
- Workplaces: Iowa State University
- Notable students: George Washington Carver; Ada Hayden
- Author abbrev. (botany): Pammel

Louis Hermann Pammel (1862–1931) was an American botanist, conservationist, and professor of botany.

== Biography ==
Louis Hermann Pammel was the second of six children and the oldest son of his parents who were Prussian immigrants to Wisconsin. In 1885 he graduated with a bachelor's degree in agriculture from the University of Wisconsin–Madison, where William Trelease taught him in courses in ecology, cryptogamic botany, and botanical taxonomy. In July 1885 he became employed in a Chicago seed company. In October 1885 he became a medical student at Philadelphia's Hahnemann Medical College. However, he soon accepted an offer to work as an assistant to the botanist William G. Farlow at Harvard University and arrived in Cambridge, Massachusetts in early December 1885. In the spring of 1886 Pammel received a letter from William Trelease, his former botany professor at Wisconsin, who had moved in 1885 to Washington University in St. Louis. The letter offered Pammel an assistantship at the Shaw School of Botany with a salary of $50 per month for the eight months of the academic year. He accepted and began work there in the fall of 1886. He became a graduate student there and in 1887 married Augusta Marie Emmel. During the next decade, the couple had six children. In 1887 he had a summer job at the Texas Agricultural Experiment Station at College Station, Texas; he discovered that root rot of cotton plants was caused by a fungus, which Benjamin Duggar in 1916 named Phymatotricum omnivorum; it is now known as Phymatotrichopis omnivorum or Texas root rot. This discovery gained Pammel a national reputation and he later used this research for his master's degree at the University of Wisconsin. In February 1889 he became a professor of botany at the Iowa State Agricultural College (later renamed Iowa State University). In 1899 he received his PhD from Washington University in St. Louis. At Iowa State, Pammel became head of the department of botany in 1918 and retired as professor emeritus in 1929. He played an important role in securing land for Iowa's state parks.

He was president of the Iowa Academy of Science in 1892–1893 and again in 1923–1924.

A keen conservationist Pammel enjoyed outdoor recreation and was a prominent figure in the preservation of Iowa's natural parks. He served as president of the Iowa Park and Forestry Association (1905–1907) and of the Iowa State Board of Conservation (1918–1927), writing the Iowa Conservation Bill. Pammel is in part responsible for the designation of 36 state parks in Iowa and the "Pammel State Park" in Madison now bears testament to his dedication. Also an enthusiastic promoter of environmental education, he passed away while travelling to California where he and his wife of 43 years, Augusta Emmel, would spend the winter months. Leaving behind him five daughters and a son, his botanical legacy includes a herbarium of over 180,000 specimens which is housed in the herbarium of Iowa State College (ISC).

Among Pammel's notable students are George Washington Carver and Ada Hayden.

== Eponyms ==
- Melica subulata var. pammelii (Scribn.) C. L. Hitchc. (Pammel's oniongrass)
- Hordeum pammelii Scribn. & Ball (a grass)
- Senecio pammelii Greenman (a composite)

== Selected publications ==
- Pammel, Louis Hermann (1890). Cotton Root-rot.
- Flower Ecology. J.B. Hungerford. 1890.
- Pammel, Louis Hermann (1899). Anatomical characters of the seeds of Leguminosae: chiefly genera of Gray's Manual.
- with Julius Buel Weems, Carleton R. Ball, Frank Lamson-Scribner, and Harry Foster Bain: The Grasses of Iowa. Iowa Geological Survey bulletin no. 1. April 1901. (vol. 1, 1901; vol. 2, 1904)
- Pammel, Louis Hermann (1903). Some Weeds of Iowa.
- A Manual of Poisonous Plants. The Torch press. 1910.
- Weeds of the Farm and Garden. 1911. Pammel, Louis Hermann (1912). 1912 edition.
- with collaboration from Charlotte M. King, John Nathan Martin, Jules Cool Cunningham, Ada Hayden, and Harriette Susan Kellogg: The Weed Flora of Iowa. Des Moines, Iowa Geological Survey. 1913.
