= List of National Historic Landmarks in Iowa =

Iowa National Historic Landmarks (clickable map)

The List of National Historic Landmarks in Iowa contains the landmarks designated by the U.S. Federal Government for the U.S. state of Iowa.

There are 29 National Historic Landmarks (NHLs) in Iowa.

== Key ==
	National Historic Landmark
^{†}	National Historic Landmark District
^{#}	National Historic Site, National Historical Park, National Memorial, or National Monument
^{*}	Delisted Landmark

== Current NHLs ==
	Landmark name	Image	Date designated	Location	County	Description
1^{†}	Amana Colonies	Amana Colonies	June 23, 1965 (#66000336)	Middle Amana; 41°47′59″N 91°55′15″W	Iowa	Amana Villages community, historic and modern.
2	Blood Run Site	Blood Run Site	May 22, 1970 (#70000246)	Granite, IA and Shindler, SD; 43°28′N 96°35′W	Lyon, IA and Lincoln, SD	An archaeological site, overlapping into South Dakota.
3	Davis Oriole Earthlodge Site	Davis Oriole Earthlodge Site	October 16, 2012 (#12001018)	Glenwood; 41°04′16″N 95°47′12″W	Mills	A well-preserved Plains Indian lodge archaeological site; located in Pony Creek Park
4	Grenville M. Dodge House	Grenville M. Dodge House	November 5, 1961 (#66000338)	Council Bluffs; 41°15′18″N 95°50′53″W	Pottawattamie	Home of Civil War General and Union Pacific Chief Engineer Grenville Dodge.
5	Dubuque County Jail	Dubuque County Jail	May 28, 1987 (#72000473)	Dubuque; 42°30′06″N 90°39′53″W	Dubuque	Example of the uncommon Egyptian Revival architectural style.
6	The Farm House	The Farm House	July 19, 1964 (#66000339)	Ames; 42°01′41″N 93°38′32″W	Story	Home of agriculturist Seaman A. Knapp and of U.S. Secretary of Agriculture James "Tama Jim" Wilson, oldest building on Iowa State University campus.
7^{†}	Fort Des Moines Provisional Army Officer Training School	Fort Des Moines Provisional Army Officer Training School	May 30, 1974 (#74000805)	Des Moines 41.526606°N 93.615233°W; 41°31′36″N 93°36′55″W	Polk	Training site for black officers in World War I.
8	George M. Verity (towboat)	George M. Verity (towboat)	December 20, 1989 (#89002459)	Keokuk; 40°23′29″N 91°22′21″W	Lee	One of three surviving steam-powered towboats in the United States, this ship pioneered on upper Mississippi in a certain way, leading to large private industry.
9	William P. Hepburn House	William P. Hepburn House	December 8, 1976 (#73000736)	Clarinda; 40°44′30″N 95°02′31″W	Page	Home of eleven-term Congressman William B. Hepburn.
10	Reverend George B. Hitchcock House	Reverend George B. Hitchcock House	February 17, 2006 (#77000500)	Lewis; 41°18′12″N 95°06′12″W	Cass	Used as a "station" on the Underground Railway.
11^{#}	Herbert Hoover Birthplace	Herbert Hoover Birthplace	June 23, 1965 (#66000110)	West Branch; 41°40′07″N 91°20′53″W	Cedar	Two-room cottage birthplace of Herbert Hoover, 31st U.S. President.
12	Indian Village Site (Witrock Area)	Indian Village Site (Witrock Area)	July 19, 1964 (#66000888)	Sutherland; 42°58′50″N 95°25′22″W	O'Brien	An archaeological site.
13	Kimball Village Site	Kimball Village Site	December 23, 2016 (#100000835)	Westfield	Plymouth	Late Prehistoric Plains Village site.
14	Lone Star (towboat)	Lone Star (towboat)	December 20, 1989 (#89002461)	LeClaire; 41°35′54″N 90°20′33″W	Scott	Oldest of the three surviving steam-powered towboats in the United States.
15	Merchants' National Bank	Merchants' National Bank	January 7, 1976 (#76000804)	Grinnell; 41°44′32″N 92°43′33″W	Poweshiek	Louis Sullivan-designed bank building on a corner in Grinnell.
16^{†}	Julien Dubuque's Mines	Julien Dubuque's Mines	November 4, 1993 (#88002662)	Dubuque; 42°28′07″N 90°38′47″W	Dubuque	Historic district including Julien Dubuque Monument and archaeological sites relating to early lead mining in area.
17	Old Capitol	Old Capitol	January 7, 1976 (#72000475)	Iowa City; 41°39′34″N 91°32′08″W	Johnson	It is one of the five-building Pentacrest, another NRHP.
18	Phipps Site		July 19, 1964 (#66000335)	Cherokee	Cherokee	An archaeological site.
19	Pottawattamie County Jail and Sheriff's Residence	Pottawattamie County Jail and Sheriff's Residence	December 11, 2023 (#100009825)	Council Bluffs; 41°16′35″N 95°50′39″W	Pottawattamie	One of very few surviving rotary jails.
20	Reeve REA Power Generating Plant	Reeve REA Power Generating Plant	December 13, 2024 (#100011381)	Rural Route 1 southwest of Hampton; 42°41′14″N 93°13′58″W	Franklin	The first power plant west of the Mississippi River to generate electricity for rural areas.
21	Sergeant Floyd (towboat)	Sergeant Floyd (towboat)	May 5, 1989 (#89001079)	Sioux City; 42°29′28″N 96°25′07″W	Woodbury	Another of just 3 steam-powered towboats surviving.
22	Sergeant Floyd Monument	Sergeant Floyd Monument	June 30, 1960 (#66000340)	Sioux City; 42°27′38″N 96°22′39″W	Woodbury	Monument to the only member of the 1805 Lewis and Clark Expedition who died during the trip. This is the first National Historic Landmark in the United States.
23	Surf Ballroom	Surf Ballroom	January 13, 2021 (#100006243)	Clear Lake; 43°08′24″N 93°23′23″W	Cerro Gordo	A Historic Rock and Roll Landmark where Buddy Holly, Ritchie Valens, and J. P. "The Big Bopper" Richardson gave their last performances on February 2, 1959, as part of the "Winter Dance Party Tour." They died the following day in a plane crash known colloquially as "The Day the Music Died."
24	Terrace Hill	Terrace Hill	July 31, 2003 (#03001036)	Des Moines; 41°35′00″N 93°38′56″W	Polk	Governor's mansion on hilltop in what is now downtown Des Moines.
25	Toolesboro Mound Group	Toolesboro Mound Group	May 23, 1966 (#66000337)	Toolesboro; 41°09′N 91°03′W	Louisa	Mound site.
26	Van Allen and Company Department Store	Van Allen and Company Department Store	January 7, 1976 (#76000753)	Clinton; 41°50′28″N 90°11′18″W	Clinton	A Louis Sullivan-designed 4 story building, now apartments over commercial space.
27	James B. Weaver House	James B. Weaver House	May 15, 1975 (#75000680)	Bloomfield; 40°45′19″N 92°24′45″W	Davis	Home of Congressman and presidential candidate James Weaver.
28	William M. Black (dredge)	William M. Black (dredge)	April 27, 1992 (#82002618)	Dubuque; 42°29′43″N 90°39′44″W	Dubuque	Sidewheel dredge operated by U.S. Corps of Engineers.
29	Woodbury County Courthouse	Woodbury County Courthouse	June 19, 1996 (#73000744)	Sioux City; 42°29′50″N 96°24′20″W	Woodbury	One of finest Prairie School buildings in the United States.

== Former Iowa NHLs ==
- President (steamboat) formerly in Davenport, Iowa, relocated to Mississippi and thence to Alton, Illinois

== National Park Service areas in Iowa ==
- Effigy Mounds National Monument
- Herbert Hoover National Historic Site (also an NHL, listed above)

== See also ==
- National Register of Historic Places listings in Iowa
- List of National Historic Landmarks by state
- List of National Natural Landmarks in Iowa
