= Hanging Bog State Preserve =

State preserve in Iowa

Coordinates: 42.033°N 91.767°W

- IUCN category V (protected landscape/seascape)
- Location: Linn County, Iowa
- Nearest city: Palo, Iowa
- Area: 16 acres (6.5 ha)
- Established: 1981
- Governing body: Iowa Department of Natural Resources

Hanging Bog State Preserve is a 16-acre (6.5 ha) forest that is on the edge of the Cedar River valley in Iowa. It was deeded to The Nature Conservancy in 1968, and it became a state preserve in 1981.

The bog has an area that is perennially wet because when water passes through the ground, there is a layer that the water cannot get through, causing the water to surface on a hillside and also form tufa. There are terraces formed by tufa on the lower slopes of the wooded hillsides, which are the namesake of the forest.

Skunk cabbage starts to bloom in the forest when there is still snow. There are over 170 species of plants in the forest, as well as 23 species of bryophytes. Spring wildflowers and ferns can be found in the forest. It also contains sugar maple, basswood, and red oak.
