= Dewey's Pasture and Smith's Slough =

Iowa wildlife complex with prairies and wetlands

Coordinates: 43°11′33″N 94°55′45″W

The Dewey's Pasture Wildlife Complex, also called Dewey's Pasture and Smith's Slough, is the collective name of an 8,000-acre land parcel that contains a set of glacial features. It is located in Palo Alto County, with a small portion in Clay County in the U.S. state of Iowa. It is a National Natural Landmark, designated in 1975.

== Description ==
The Iowa Department of Natural Resources, the custodian of the Wildlife Complex, describes it as a "combination of prairies, shallow lakes, wetlands and oak savanna."

Formerly managed as the shallow "Trumbull Lake", the Dewey's Pasture complex is today managed as a complex of wetlands, oriented towards a diverse population of wading birds and shore birds. The re-management, including the cutting of non-native trees, is locally controversial. Dewey's Pasture was named as an Iowa Bird Conservation Area in 2006. The wetland bird complex supports locally rare species such as the American bittern. The complex also supports deer, pheasants, reptiles, amphibians, wetland fish, butterflies, and dragonflies.
