= Hayden Prairie State Preserve =

Protected area of tallgrass prairie in Iowa

- Location within Iowa
- Location: Howard County, Iowa
- Nearest city: Chester
- Coordinates: 43.4395°N 92.3831°W
- Area: 240 acres (97 ha)
- Established: 1945
- Governing body: Iowa Department of Natural Resources

U.S. National Natural Landmark
- Designated: 1965

The Hayden Prairie State Preserve is a 240-acre (97 ha) tallgrass prairie located in Howard County, Iowa. It is a National Natural Landmark managed by the Iowa Department of Natural Resources. Located close to the northern border of the state of Iowa, the nearest towns are Chester and Lime Springs.

== History ==
The prairie commemorates botanist Ada Hayden (1884–1950). An Iowa farm girl, Hayden studied at the Missouri Botanical Garden (MBG) and Iowa State University (ISU) and earned a PhD in biology in 1918, one of the first women to earn this distinction in the U.S. She became an assistant professor of botany at ISU, devoting her personal and professional life to the defense of the fast-disappearing tallgrass prairies of her native state. During her working lifetime, most of the remaining patches of tallgrass that had survived the rush of Euro-American settlement in the 1800s were falling to the plowshare. Finally in 1940, the state of Iowa allocated $100 to Hayden for gasoline to drive around Iowa and identify what was left.

A small number of remaining prairie patches were identified, including the parcel of land that was to become Hayden Prairie. In 1945, the state of Iowa purchased this parcel for $10,001, approximately $42/acre.

After Hayden's death in 1950, the Hayden Prairie was renamed in her honor. It was listed as a National Natural Landmark in 1965, and as an Iowa State Preserve in 1968. It has been managed by controlled burning since 1971.

== Ecology ==
The Hayden Prairie is a remnant of the tallgrass prairie ecosystem that once made up 75 to 80 percent of Iowa’s landscape. Although this remnant is only 240 acres (0.97 km^{2}) in size – less than a half section of land – it is the largest remaining parcel of tallgrass prairies surviving in Iowa outside of the Loess Hills on the western border of the state.

More than 200 plant species, including 100 species of wildflowers, have been identified in Hayden Prairie. Hayden Prairie is especially noted for a display of shooting stars peaking around the U.S. holiday of Memorial Day.

46 species of birds, and over 20 species of butterflies, have also been identified in Hayden Prairie.

== See also ==
- List of protected grasslands of North America
