= Fred G. Turner House =

Historic house in Iowa, United States

- U.S. National Register of Historic Places
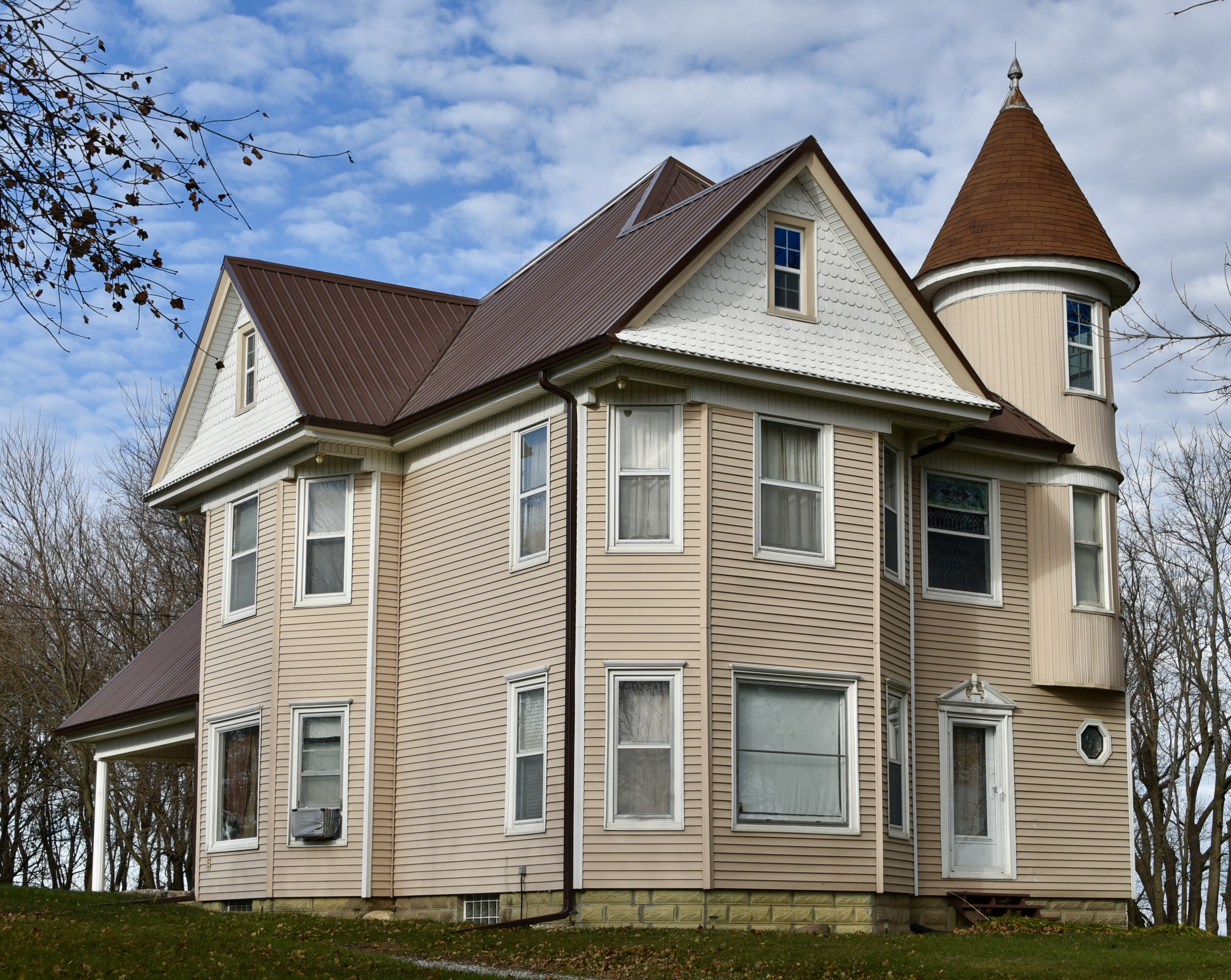

- Location within Iowa Location within the United States
- Location: Iowa Highway 149
- Nearest city: North English, Iowa
- Coordinates: 41°33′25″N 92°03′56″W
- Area: less than one acre
- Built: 1903
- Architect: Leslie Roller
- Architectural style: Queen Anne
- NRHP reference No.: 85001381
- Added to NRHP: June 27, 1985

The Fred G. Turner House, also known as Valley View Farm, is a historic building located in rural Iowa County, Iowa near the town of North English. Turner moved to this area with his family in 1866. He married in 1893 and inherited the family farm. By 1899 the farm included 500 acres (200 ha). In addition to farming, Turner was involved in politics, serving on the local school board, two terms in the Iowa House of Representatives, and as a county supervisor. The farm remained in the family until 1959. Although a free classic Queen Anne house is unusual in rural Iowa, this house is one of four in the immediate area. It was designed and built by local contractor Leslie Roller. The house features a pyramid hipped roof, lower cross gables, an irregular plan, corner turret, contrasting use of wood shingles on the gable and turret, and an asymmetrical porch. It was listed on the National Register of Historic Places in 1985.
