= E.J. Baird House =

Historic house in Iowa, United States

- U.S. National Register of Historic Places
- Location within Iowa Location within the United States
- Location: Jackson and Fremont Sts., Millersburg, Iowa
- Coordinates: 41°34′21″N 92°09′31″W
- Area: less than one acre
- Built: 1882
- Architectural style: Victorian Gothic; Stick/Eastlake
- NRHP reference No.: 82002622
- Added to NRHP: February 25, 1982

The E.J. Baird House is a historic building located in Millersburg, Iowa, United States. Baird was a prominent citizen here in the late 19th and early 20th centuries. He grew very wealthy through his involvement in commerce, banking, and farming. Baird operated a very successful general store in Millersburg, which was the primary source of his income. His 2½-story frame house is an outstanding example of Victorian "pattern book" architecture, with influences from the Victorian Gothic, Queen Anne, and Eastlake styles. The Victorian Gothic is found in the vergeboard on the gable ends. The Queen Anne style is found in the two-story projecting bay that is capped with a pyramid-shaped roof. The Eastlake influence is more dominant than the others. Its decorative influence is found in the sunburst on the projecting front dormer, the decorative brackets along the eaves, and the large porch with its lattice-like base, spindle balustrades, and turned posts. The house was listed on the National Register of Historic Places in 1982.
