= Cayler Prairie State Preserve =

Protected area of tallgrass prairie in Iowa

Coordinates: 43°23′50″N 95°14′38″W

- Cayler Prairie
- IUCN category V (protected landscape/seascape)
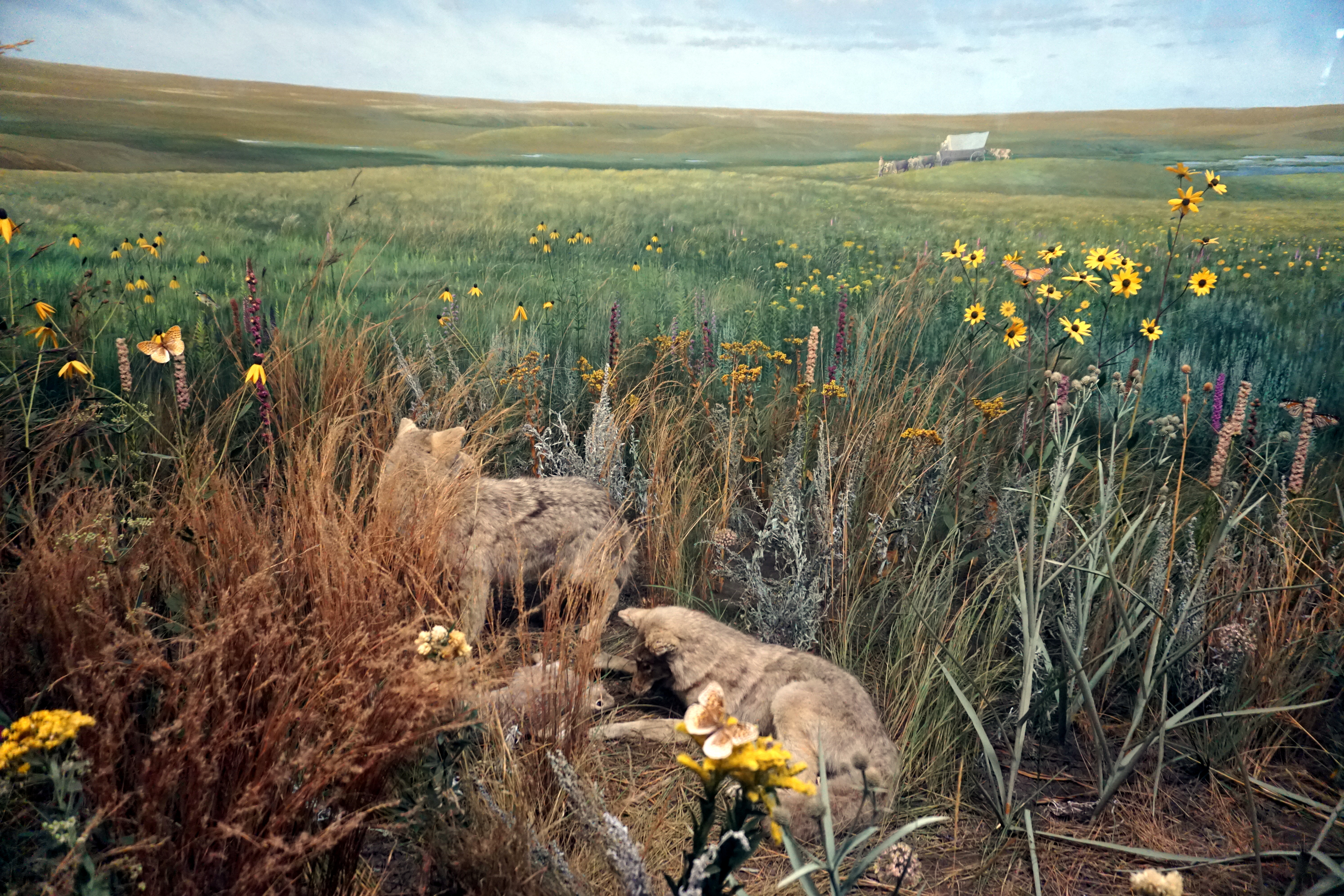
- The True Prairie: Cayler Prairie, Iowa diorama at the Milwaukee Public Museum
- Location: Dickinson County, Iowa
- Nearest city: Spirit Lake, IA
- Area: 160 acres (65 ha)
- Established: 1971
- Governing body: Iowa Department of Natural Resources

Cayler Prairie State Preserve is a 160-acre land parcel of tallgrass prairie located in the northwest region of the U.S. state of Iowa in Dickinson County near Spirit Lake. It is a National Natural Landmark.

== Description ==
Cayler Prairie is dominated by big bluestem grass. Prairie forbs include (in spring) golden alexander and Lambert's crazyweed; (in summer) sawtooth sunflower and prairie rose; and (in fall) Missouri goldenrod, New England aster and dotted gayfeather. The prairie rose that blooms here is the state flower of Iowa.

Adjacent wetlands are managed in combination with the prairie, creating a managed land complex of 1,204 acres. Historically, much of the visitation to the prairie has been connected with wetland and upland wildfowl hunting.

The prairie was discovered by botanist Ada Hayden in 1944, who recognized tallgrass plants growing in a hayfield. She recommended that it be preserved as one of the last remaining patches of old-growth tallgrass prairie in Iowa. In 1958, the Cayler family - who had owned the land since frontier settlement - sold the land parcel to the Iowa Conservation Commission. The tallgrass parcel was named as a National Natural Landmark in 1966, and was dedicated as a state nature preserve in 1971. Bufferland was purchased in 1998.
