= Ladora Savings Bank =

- U.S. National Register of Historic Places
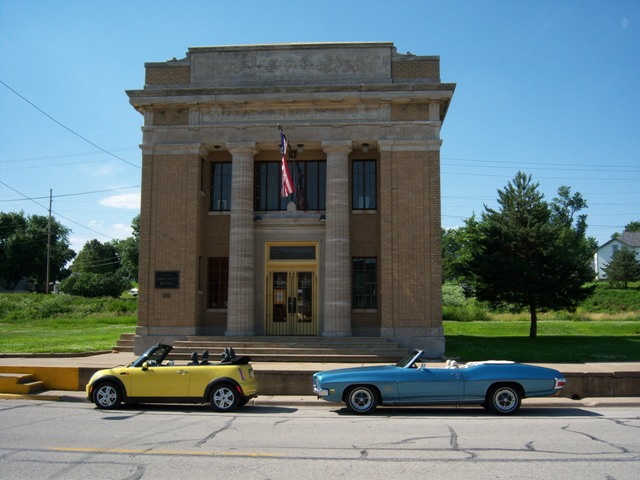
- Street view

- Location within Iowa Location within the United States
- Location: 811 Pacific St., Ladora, Iowa, United States
- Coordinates: 41°45′17″N 92°11′1″W
- Built: 1920
- Architect: William Lightner, Charles B. Zalesky
- Architectural style: Classical Revival
- NRHP reference No.: 90001196
- Added to NRHP: August 3, 1990

The Ladora Savings Bank is a historic structure along U.S. Route 6 in Ladora, Iowa, United States. Constructed in 1920, it was closed when the bank that built it failed in the Great Depression, leaving it to be used by a succession of businesses. It was occupied by a restaurant, the Ladora Bank Bistro, but that closed down in February 2019. It has been listed on the National Register of Historic Places since August 3, 1990.

== Structure ==
Designed by William Lightner and Charles B. Zalesky, the masonry Neoclassically styled building included two substantial Doric columns in its facade and several tall windows on the sides. The structure originally included restrooms (including an outside exit for women to use discreetly), which were an unusual feature; at its opening, the bank promoted these restrooms to its customers. Among its interior features visible to the public were marble counters, wooden floors, and paintings on the wall, while massive vaults were built to protect valuables; recent renovations have restored these features, most of which still remain.

== History ==
The Ladora Savings Bank building was dedicated on July 26, 1920. The bank survived the tumultuous economic times of the 1920s, but it could not withstand the Great Depression, which led to its closure on July 27, 1931. The building remained a center of life in Ladora: during various times in its history, it served as a community center, housing a Red Cross office during World War II and a civil defense shelter during the Cold War; it was also a polling place for many years. It was also a commercial building at certain points in its history, housing at various times an insurance salesman's office, an attorney's office, an antique shop, and a rest area for truck drivers traveling along U.S. 6. During this period, it was added to the National Register of Historic Places, being included primarily for its architecture.

=== Reopening ===
After some years of inactivity, the bank building was purchased in October 2004 by businessman Dimitri Makedonsky, who also owns properties around the bank. Dimitri proceeded to renovate the building: replacing the roof, redesigning the interior, and gradually restoring the interior to an appearance similar to that of a bank from the 1920s. Hoping to open a restaurant in the building, he refurbished several major side rooms: as the celebrated original restrooms no longer functioned, they were turned into museum rooms, while the bank's substantial vault became a lounge. The restaurant opened on May 15, 2008. After over a decade of operating as The Ladora Bank Bistro, the building now houses an Iowa Caucus themed bistro named Caucus Bistro.
