= Bixby State Preserve =

Nature reserve in Clayton County, Iowa, US

Coordinates: 42.67°N 91.40°W

- IUCN category V (protected landscape/seascape)
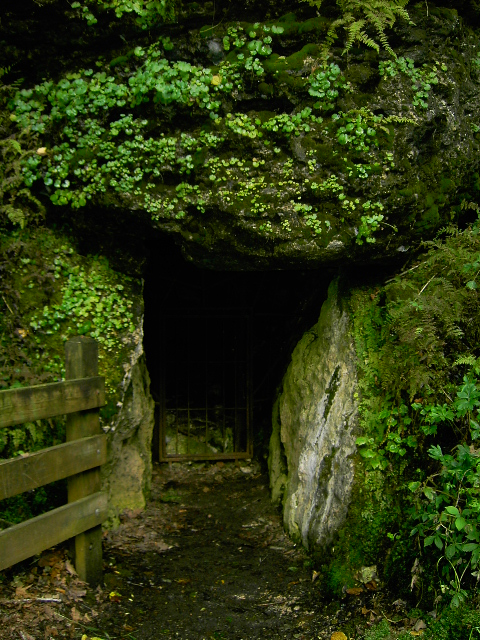
- Ice Cave at Bixby State Preserve
- Location: Clayton County, IA
- Nearest city: Edgewood, IA
- Area: 185 acres (75 ha)
- Governing body: Iowa Department of Natural Resources

Bixby State Preserve is a nature reserve located in southwestern Clayton County, Iowa, in the midwestern United States. It is located 3 miles (4.8 km) north of Edgewood. It is operated by the Iowa Department of Natural Resources as one of the Iowa state preserves.

Bixby State Preserve is one of the few places in the world to contain algific talus slopes and consequently has an ecosystem encountered in only a few other sites, all in the Driftless Area. They are mainly elsewhere in Iowa, but also in southeastern Minnesota, southwestern Wisconsin and northwestern Illinois.

In winter and early spring comparatively warm air rises from the elaborate system of sinkholes, causing cold moist air to be drawn into the north-facing talus slopes and sent through fissures into ice caves, where it turns to ice on the walls of the cave. In summer and fall, the system is reversed, with cool moist air venting to the talus slopes, creating a unique ecosystem.

The only road into the preserve is closed on both the north and south sides of the preserve as of June 7, 2013. The south entrance is open during the summer. Trout fishing is allowed.

== Sources ==
- Bowling Green State University: Bixby State Preserve
- Clayton County - Bixby State Preserve recreation
- Delaware County
