= Turkey River Mounds State Preserve =

Preserve in the Turkey River

- Location within Iowa Location within the United States
- Location: Clayton, Iowa, United States
- Coordinates: 42°43′11″N 91°02′54″W
- Area: 62 acres (25 ha)
- Elevation: 761 ft (232 m)
- Established: 1968
- Governing body: Iowa Department of Natural Resources
- Turkey River State Preserve; Archeological District
- U.S. National Register of Historic Places
- U.S. Historic district
- MPS: Prehistoric Mounds of the Quad-State Region of the Upper Mississippi River Valley MPS
- NRHP reference No.: 90000774
- Added to NRHP: May 30, 1990

Turkey River Mounds State Preserve is a historic site located near the unincorporated community of Millville, Iowa, United States. The 62-acre (25 ha) preserve contains thirty-eight of forty-three Native American mounds located on a narrow Paleozoic Plateau at the confluence of the Mississippi and Turkey rivers. They vary in size and shape and are 1.3 feet (0.40 m) to 6 feet (1.8 m) in height. The conical mounds range from 20 feet (6.1 m) to over 100 feet (30 m) in diameter. The linear mounds vary from 80 feet (24 m) to 175 feet (53 m) in length. There is one effigy mound in the shape of a panther that is 98 feet (30 m) long and 40 feet (12 m) wide. There are also compound mounds in the preserve. The mounds were constructed during the Woodland period (500 BCE and 900 CE). They were used for burials and ceremonial places, and are now protected by law. The preserve is also home to a variety of trees, prairie grasses and flowers.

The mounds were first surveyed in 1885, and Ellison Orr studied them in the 1930s. People from Dubuque, Iowa bought the property in 1934 and gave it to the Iowa Conservation Commission in 1940. Other archaeological surveys were undertaken in 1964 and 1973. It was dedicated as a state preserve in 1968 for its archaeological, geological, and biological qualities. The preserve was listed on the National Register of Historic Places as a historic district in 1990.
