= Ada Hayden =

American botanist, educator, curator and preservationist

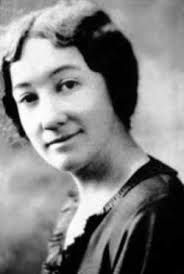
- Born: 14 August 1884
- Died: 12 August 1950 (aged 65)
- Education: Iowa State University; Washington University in St. Louis
- Occupation: Botanist

Ada Hayden (14 August 1884 – 12 August 1950) was an American botanist, educator, and preservationist. She was the curator of the Iowa State University Herbarium, which was renamed the Ada Hayden Herbarium (ISC) in her honour in 1988. During her career, she added more than 40,000 specimens to the herbarium. Her studies and conservation work were particularly important in ensuring the preservation of the tallgrass prairie.

The Hayden Prairie State Preserve, the first area dedicated as a preserve under Iowa's State Preserves Act of 1965, is named in her honor. Also named in her honor is the Ada Hayden Heritage Park in Ames, Iowa.

== Childhood and education ==
Ada Hayden was born August 14, 1884 near Ames, Iowa to Maitland David Hayden and Christine Hayden. While still in high school, Louis Hermann Pammel became her mentor. She earned a bachelor's degree in botany from Iowa State College in 1908, a master's degree from Washington University in St. Louis in 1910, and a Ph.D. from Iowa State in 1918. She was the first woman and fourth person to receive a doctorate from Iowa State College.

== Career ==
Hayden taught botany as an instructor at Iowa State beginning in 1911, and continued in this role until she earned her doctoral degree. She became an assistant professor of botany in 1920, and a research assistant professor at the Agricultural Experimental Station (Lakes Region) and curator of the herbarium in 1934. She worked closely with Louis Pammel and Charlotte King, contributing to The Weed Flora of Iowa (1926) and Honey Plants of Iowa (1930). In both these works and her own, Hayden displayed a significant proficiency with photography when portraying the subjects of her research.

She concentrated on prairie plants of the lakes region, and is credited with "possibly the best published native flora survey… of any part of Iowa". She was an early advocate of prairie preservation through writing and speaking. In fact, the 1940’s were marked by significant damage to the natural vegetation that once protected Iowa’s fertile soils. Much of the land had been plowed for grain production, leaving only small remnants of the original prairie. During this time, Hayden received a $100 grant from the Iowa Academy of Science to monitor the state’s remaining prairies.

In 1944, she and J. M. Aikman released a report identifying possible areas of preservable prairie in Iowa and Hayden became director of the "Prairie Project". She systematically developed a database of information relevant for decisions about land acquisition, working with the State Conservation Commission (SCC) to purchase areas of relict prairie. Despite her relentless work and dedication to studying flora and prairies, she was denied many permanent teaching and research jobs at Iowa State.

She was an active member of the Ecological Society of America for many years.

Ada Hayden died of cancer in 1950, at age 65. After her death, in 1988 a herbarium on Iowa State's campus was dedicated in her name. In 1967, she was inducted into the Iowa Conservation Hall of Fame. In 2002-2004, "Ada Hayden Heritage Park", near where Ada grew up, was named after her.
