= Old State Quarry State Preserve =

- Old State Quarry
- U.S. National Register of Historic Places
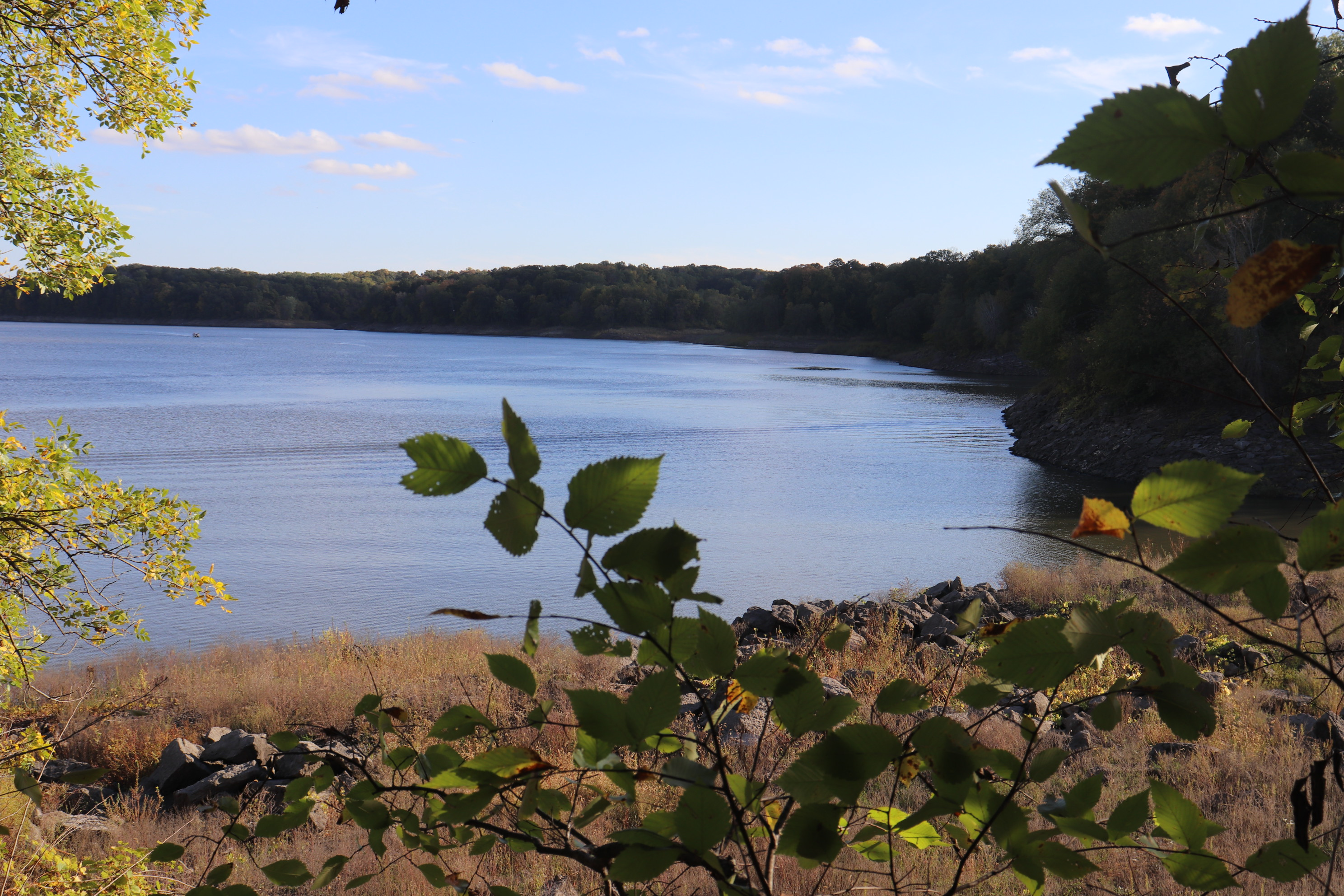
- An elevated view of the Iowa River from State Quarry

- Location within Iowa Location within the United States
- Location: 0.1 miles (0.16 km) south of the southern end of Rice Ridge Ln., NE., at Coralville Lake
- Nearest city: North Liberty, Iowa
- Coordinates: 41°45′48″N 91°34′13″W
- Area: 1.7 acres (0.69 ha)
- NRHP reference No.: 97001676
- Added to NRHP: February 23, 1998

The Old State Quarry State Preserve, also known as the North Bend Quarries, Capitol Quarry, Old Capitol Quarry, and the State Quarry, is a historic site located northeast of North Liberty, Iowa, United States. The quarry, originally known as North Bend Quarries, began operations in 1842. It provided limestone for numerous buildings and structures in Iowa City and elsewhere in the state. The list includes the Old Capital (1842), the foundations for Old Brick Church (1856) and the present Iowa State Capitol (1886) in Des Moines. The exact date that the quarry closed is not known, but because there is no evidence of mechanized techniques to remove stone, it is assumed it closed around the turn of the 20th century. There are, however, hand tool marks in the remaining stone. From 1874 to 1911 Samuel Calvin, professor of natural history at the State University of Iowa, used the quarry for both research and instruction in geology and paleontology.

The limestone here is made up largely of cemented fragments of brachiopods that lived in a shallow tropical sea that covered this area during the Devonian period. There is also evidence of fish teeth and plates in the lower parts of the channel sequence. The preserve is the type locality for “State Quarry Limestone,” determined by Calvin, and only found in Johnson County, Iowa. The quarry became a historical state preserve in 1969, and it was listed on the National Register of Historic Places in 1998.
