= Lenox Township, Iowa County, Iowa =

Township in Iowa County, Iowa, U.S.

Coordinates: 41.818°N 91.890°W

Lenox Township is a township in Iowa County, Iowa, USA.

== History ==
Lenox Township was established in 1855.
