= Pilot Grove State Preserve =

- Pilot Grove
- U.S. National Register of Historic Places
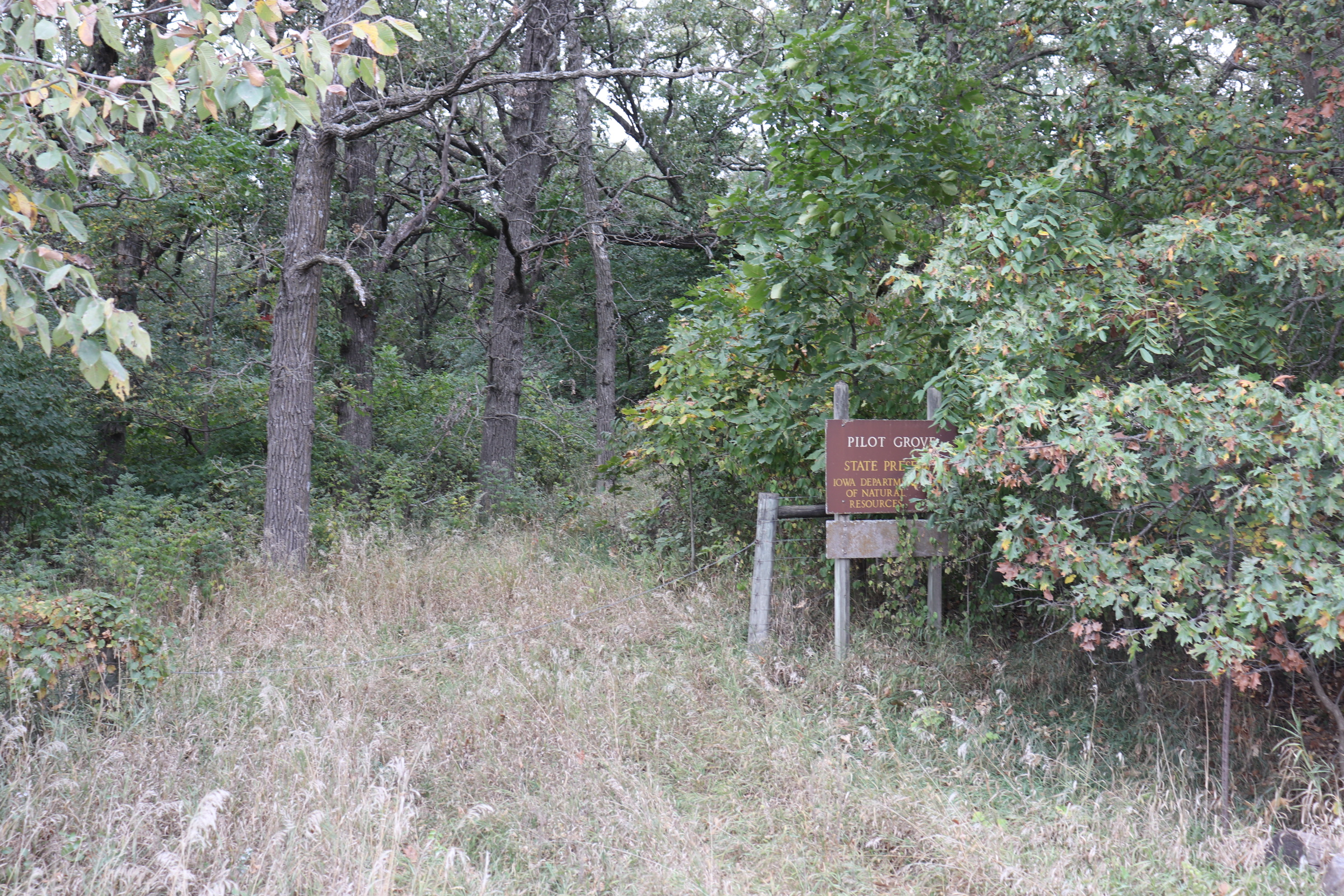
- Entrance to Pilot Grove

- Location within Iowa Location within the United States
- Location: Southwest of Williamsburg, Iowa
- Coordinates: 41°37′49″N 92°05′03″W
- Area: 6 acres (2.4 ha)
- NRHP reference No.: 77000519
- Added to NRHP: November 17, 1977

Pilot Grove State Preserve is a historic site located southwest of Williamsburg, Iowa, United States in rural Iowa County. The site is a wooded knoll surrounded by prairie between the North English River and Old Man's Creek. It consists of the old townsite, hickory, oak and walnut trees, along with patches of virgin prairie covered with bluestem, gramma, switch and Indian grasses, and a variety of native prairie wildflowers. There was no other timber in the area during the early years of Iowa's settlement, and it was a landmark for the pioneers traveling west across the state. It was given its name because it gave people who traveled to and from Marengo, Iowa a sense of direction. A 4-acre (1.6 ha) cemetery was established adjacent to the knoll in 1867. The site was listed on the National Register of Historic Places in 1977. The property had been owned by the Kelting family, who donated it to the Iowa Conservation Commission so that they could restore it and maintain its mid-19th-century condition at the time of Iowa's pioneer settlement. It was dedicated as a historical state preserve in 1980.
