= Indian Fish Trap State Preserve =

- Indian Fish Weir
- U.S. National Register of Historic Places
- Location: Address restricted
- Nearest city: Middle Amana, Iowa
- Area: less than one acre
- NRHP reference No.: 88001122
- Added to NRHP: July 21, 1988

Indian Fish Trap State Preserve, also known as the Indian Fish Weir, is a historic site located near the Amana Colonies in rural Iowa County, Iowa. The fish weir is an array of rocks in a V-shaped formation in the Iowa River. It is the only structure of this kind in Iowa.

== History ==
It is not known when the fish weir was built, possibly in either the Late Prehistoric period or Early Historic period. Glacial boulders from a nearby bluff were probably used to construct it. Each wing of the dam is about 155 feet (47 m) in length. The fish were thought to be herded toward the vertex of the "V" where they would be easier to net or spear. They were then placed into an adjacent holding pool. Early pioneers discovered the weir, and it was included on a General Land Office map in the 1840s. Archaeologist Charles R. Keyes wrote about the weir in 1925.

Historically, the weir was submerged below the surface in high water. The Coralville Reservoir pool partially inundates the preserve, which also affects the visibility of the weir. There are three Indian burial mounds that date from the Early Woodland Period located nearby. The fish weir was relocated in 1952, and dedicated as an archaeological state preserve in 1976. It was listed on the National Register of Historic Places in 1988.

Shifting of the Iowa River in the 1990s appears to have buried the fish weir, and it is now south of the main river channel, possibly buried in silt.
