= Cold Water Spring State Preserve =

State preserve in Iowa

Coordinates: 43.44111°N 91.96028°W

Cold Water Spring State Preserve is a 60-acre (240,000 m^{2}) parcel state preserve protecting a spring that issues from Cold Water Cave, an extensive cave system in Winneshiek County, Iowa and Fillmore County, Minnesota. The spring is a tributary of the Upper Iowa River.

The cave system contains a large underground creek that courses around much of the cave's nearly 16 miles (26 km) of passages. The cave system has some unusual features such as its expansion rate, which is higher than most caves. It also has relatively low amounts of oxygen and high amounts of carbon dioxide. In 1987, the Cold Water Cave was designated as a National Natural Landmark by the National Park Service.

There are two entries; both are on private property.

Coldwater Creek Wildlife Management Area is a state hunting ground near Bluffton, and is near to the cave system.

The cave is located in the Driftless Area of Iowa and Minnesota, a region characterized by karst topography, which involves disappearing streams, blind valleys, sinkholes, caves, cold springs, and cold streams, all of which are present here.

== Sources ==
- Cold Water Spring State Preserve Retrieved November 5, 2025
- Karstpreserve.com, retrieved July 22, 2007
- "Interview with John Ackerman" (PDF). July 2003. Archived from the original (PDF) on March 22, 2006.
