= Algific talus slope =

Rare and fragile ecosystem and habitat

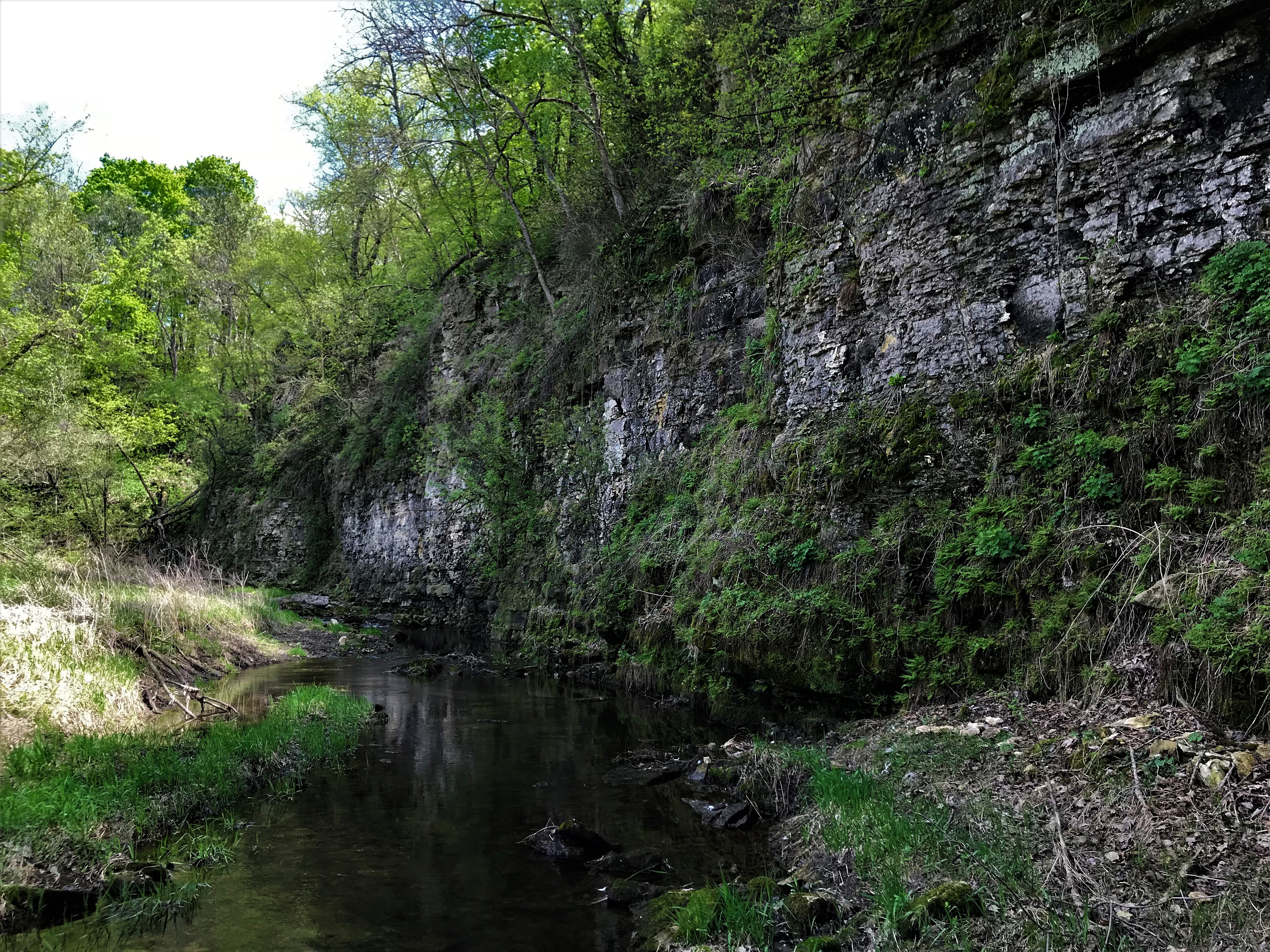
Algific talus slopes along Howard Creek at Driftless Area National Wildlife Refuge, May 2018

Algific talus slopes comprise a very rare, fragile ecosystem and habitat initially believed to exist only in the Driftless Area of Minnesota, Wisconsin, Illinois, and especially, Iowa. More recently, other algific talus slopes have been identified in the Allegheny Mountains of West Virginia. It has been suggested that close comparison with similar sites worldwide may enlarge the distribution, or that the term may become restricted to the flora and fauna characteristic of these zones within the Driftless Area.

== Description ==
Algific means "cold producing" while "talus slope" refers to a collection of talus or broken rock which rests near the surface it detached from. A related term is maderate cliff, which is an algific slope lacking talus. They were first described in the early 1980s. These ecosystems can only exist in regions displaying karst topography.

Algific talus slopes are found mainly on north-facing slopes of ridges and canyons and are characterized by crumbly, heavily fissured, and porous exposed bedrock, with an overburden of talus remaining in situ from where it detached from its underlying bedrock; it may also display scree, which is talus finding its narrowest angle of repose down-canyon. This is a "unique system involving ridgetop sinkholes and subterranean ice caves; this system also supports Maderate Cliffs." The valleys in which they occur tend to be very steep, and often have dense forest cover.

== Climate ==
In summer, the cooler talus-covered slopes power an air exchange with sinkholes atop the ridge, with warm air entering the sinkhole to an ice cave. The air is cooled and vented on the algific slope. In winter, the airflow is reversed. Cool or cold air is drawn through the algific talus into the ice cave, with flowing water or atmospheric humidity being turned to ice. The air temperature on these slopes ranges from "30 degrees F to 55 degrees F spring to fall".

This causes a cooler, more moist summer environment than that which may occur a relatively short distance away. The result is a rather boreal ecosystem more associated with that found to the north at the Canada–US border. It can also host relict populations not found elsewhere locally. "The vegetative community on algific talus slopes is different than the surrounding forest and typically contains ferns, mosses, liverworts, evergreen species such as Canada yew and balsam fir, birch, basswood, and sugar maple, and boreal disjunct herbs and ferns."

== Distribution ==
The only sites in Wisconsin are "the Western Coulee and Ridges Ecological Landscape in western Grant County and are within a few miles of the Mississippi River".

The great majority of the protected sites are closed to the general public, and in fact, are notably undocumented on the net, in order to keep them out of the eye of those who would vandalize them. One place that can be visited, however, is Bixby State Preserve, in southwestern Clayton County, Iowa.

== Endangered and threatened species ==
The Iowa Pleistocene Snail was believed extinct until it was discovered on algific talus slopes in northeast Iowa in 1955. Placed on the Endangered Species List in 1977, Congress created the Driftless Area National Wildlife Refuge in 1989 to protect this species, as well as other threatened and relict species. Much of this refuge was carved out of pre-existing protected areas, most notably the Upper Mississippi River National Wildlife and Fish Refuge. The Northern monkshood, a wildflower in the buttercup family (Ranunculaceae), occurs only in the Driftless Area, New York, and Ohio. Northern monkshood is listed in the Endangered Species Act. Algific talus slopes have also been posited to harbor rare lichen species.
