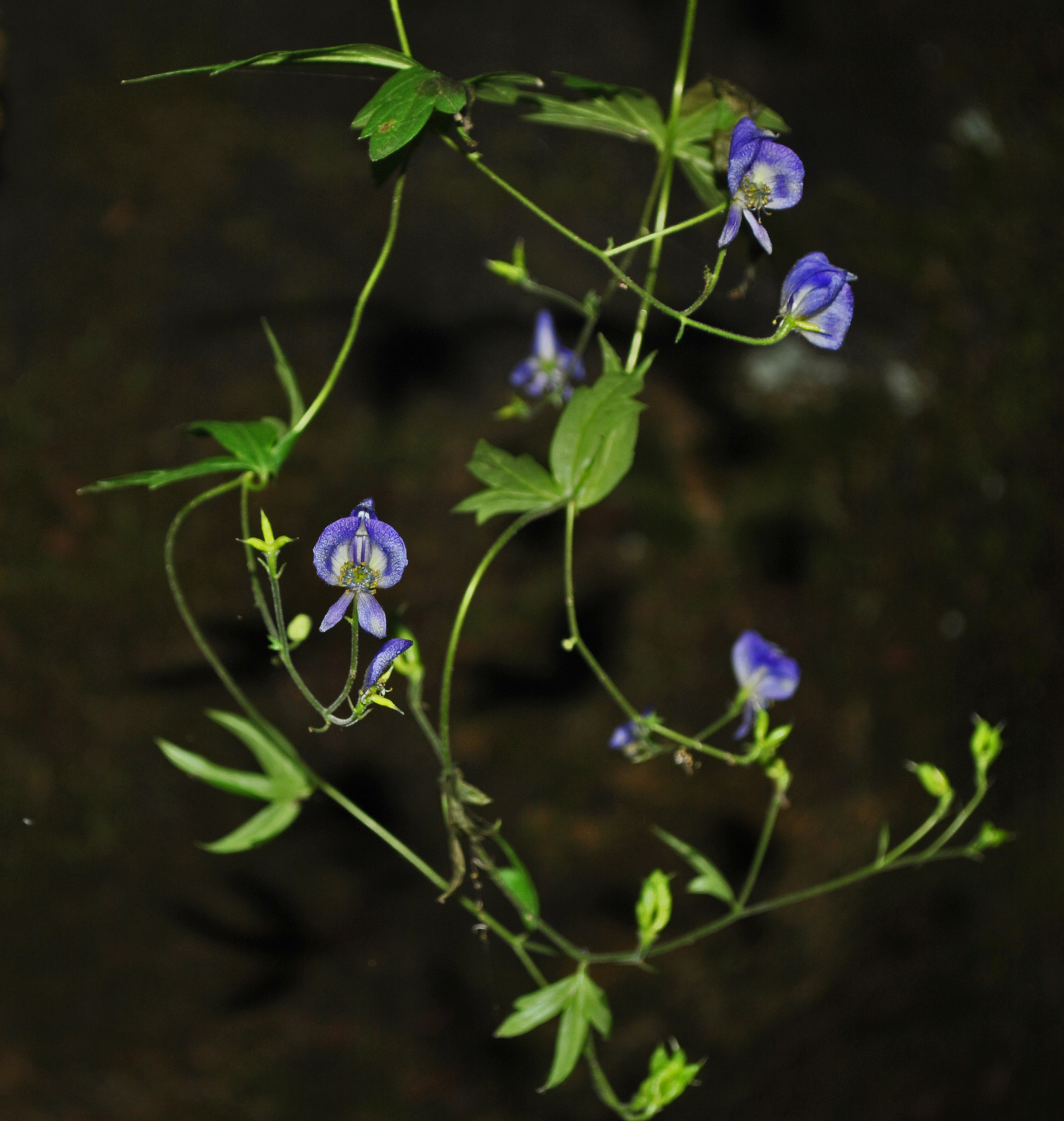

Conservation status
- Vulnerable (NatureServe)

- Threatened (ESA)

Scientific classification
- Kingdom: Plantae
- Clade: Embryophytes
- Clade: Tracheophytes
- Clade: Spermatophytes
- Clade: Angiosperms
- Clade: Eudicots
- Order: Ranunculales
- Family: Ranunculaceae
- Genus: Aconitum
- Species: A. noveboracense

Binomial name
- Aconitum noveboracense A.Gray ex Coville

= Aconitum noveboracense =

Northern wild monkshood

Species of flowering plant

Aconitum noveboracense, also known as northern blue monkshood or northern wild monkshood, is a flowering plant belonging to the buttercup family (Ranunculaceae). Members of its genus (Aconitum) are also known as wolfsbane.

A. noveboracense is listed as a threatened species by the United States Fish and Wildlife Service. The species can only be found in Iowa, Wisconsin, Ohio, and New York, and populations have been in decline since the 1980s. A narrow set of environmental conditions for growth limit the plant to these areas, so a species recovery plan has been set in place to preserve the populations in these habitats.

Blue, helmet-shaped flowers about 1 inch (2.5 cm) in length are characteristic of northern monkshood. Stems may have many flowers, and range from about 1 to 4 feet (0.30 to 1.22 m) in length. The leaves of A. noveboracense are broad with lobes that are coarse and toothed.

Northern monkshood is a perennial and can reproduce sexually by pollination or vegetatively by producing bulbils. Self fertilization is usually not a viable means for reproduction in A. noveboracense. The flowers bloom between June and September and are pollinated by bumblebees. The seeds are dispersed through water or gravity.

== Taxonomy ==
=== Characteristics ===
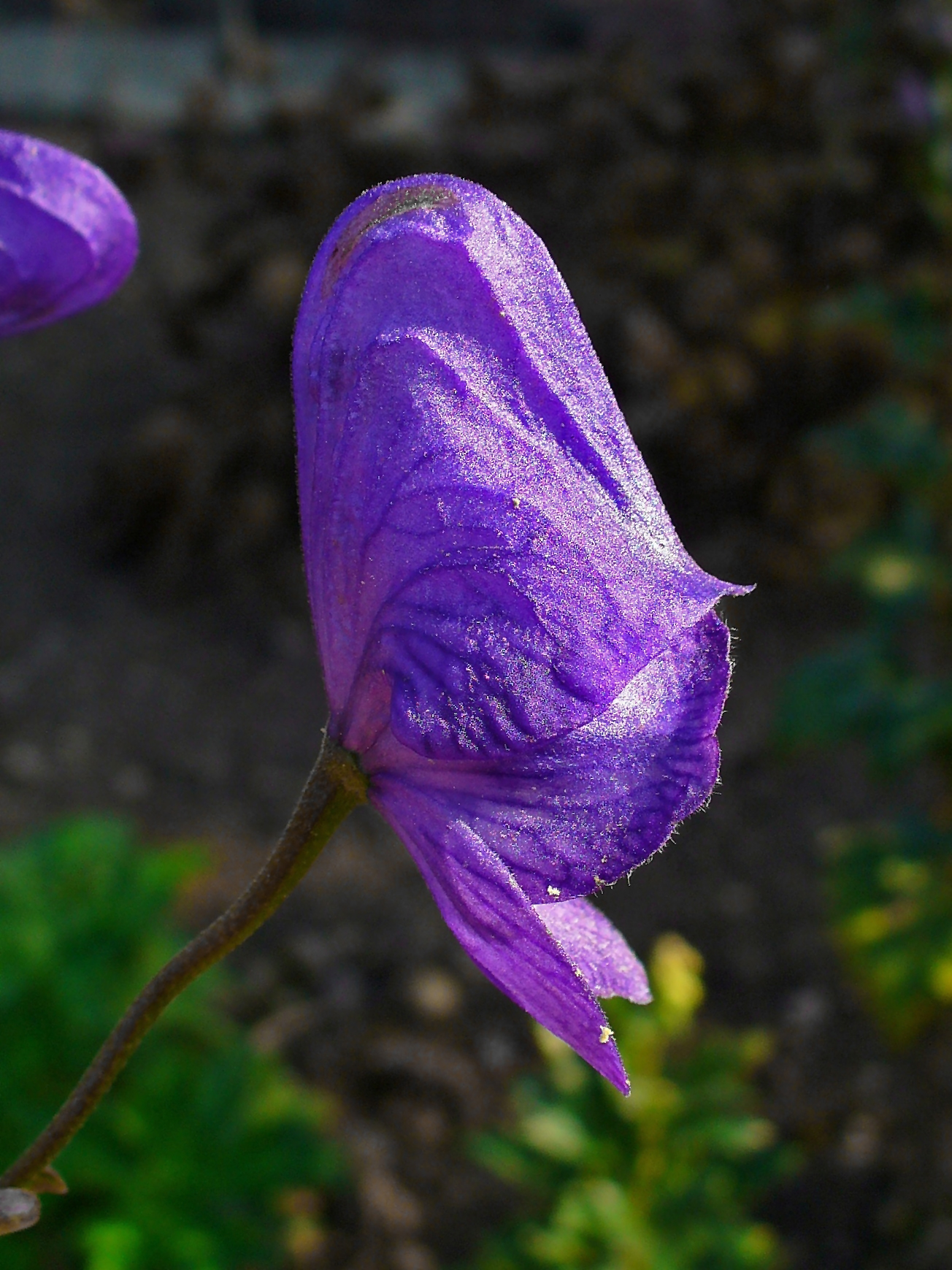
Close up of Aconitum flower

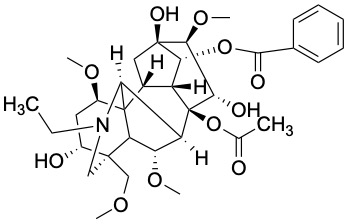
Structure of Aconitine

Aconitum is a genus of herbaceous perennial plant that is part of the family Ranunculaceae. The genus contains highly toxic alkaloids that act as cardiotoxins or neurotoxins (aconitine). Aconitine may be lethal in humans in doses of only 1.5–6 mg. Leaves of the plant are arranged spirally and have 5-7 segments with no stipules. The segments have three lobes and are toothed. The flowers of the plant are bisexual and bilaterally symmetric, and come in many colors. Most often, the petals are blue or purple, but they may also be pink, yellow, or white. The upper sepal of the flower is helmet shaped, and the two true petals are contained within the hood. This appearance led to the name "monkshood". Northern monkshood was considered a disjunct population of Aconitum columbianum due to its morphological similarities. Genetic characterization of Aconitum noveboracense demonstrates similarity to A. columbianum populations located in western North America.

== Distribution and habitat ==
Most populations of Northern Monkshood plant are found in northeastern Ohio, and portions of the "Driftless Area" located in northeast Iowa and southwest Wisconsin. Only seven populations of the plant can be found in the Catskill Mountains of New York State.

Aconitum noveboracense is typically found on shaded or partially shaded cliffs, algific talus slopes, or on cool, streamside sites. These areas have cool soil conditions, cold air drainage, or cold groundwater flowage. Outflow of cool air and water from ice in underground fissures causes these conditions on algific talus slopes. These fissures are connected to sinkholes and are a conduit for the air flows. A. noveboracense seedlings are highly sensitive to their environmental conditions and thrive in soil with a high moisture content. Adult plants are less sensitive to variations in environmental conditions than seedlings, and survivorship of the seedlings is reduced with decreases in temperature or moisture content.

== Causes of threatened status ==
Northern monkshood is threatened by damage to its narrow habitat range. Humans may contribute to degradation through developments like the construction of roads and powerlines. Scientific collection may also put A. noveboracense at risk. Deer overpopulation has severely impacted the Catskill mountain populations of Northern monkshood, which are put at risk by deer herbivory. Deer and other livestock contribute to the degradation of the habitat by trampling and grazing. Rising temperatures due to climate change endanger the sensitive environmental conditions required by A. noveboracense. For some New York populations, drought and flooding have impacted populations found at headwater streams.

== Protection ==
In 1978, Northern monkshood was added to the U.S. List of Endangered and Threatened Wildlife and Plants. The U.S. Fish and Wildlife Service developed a species recovery plan that describes actions needed to help the plant survive. A. noveboracense is not likely to become a common species even with recovery efforts, due to its specific ecological needs. Instead, the recovery plan proposes that action should be taken to protect existing populations and their habitats. Government and private conservation agencies are working to preserve the habitat of northern monkshood, and some private landowners have made voluntary protection agreements. The recovery plan outlined in 1978 also lists searching for new populations and further research into propagation of the plant as desired steps for its protection. The established populations are being monitored and profiled for population trends.

== Images ==
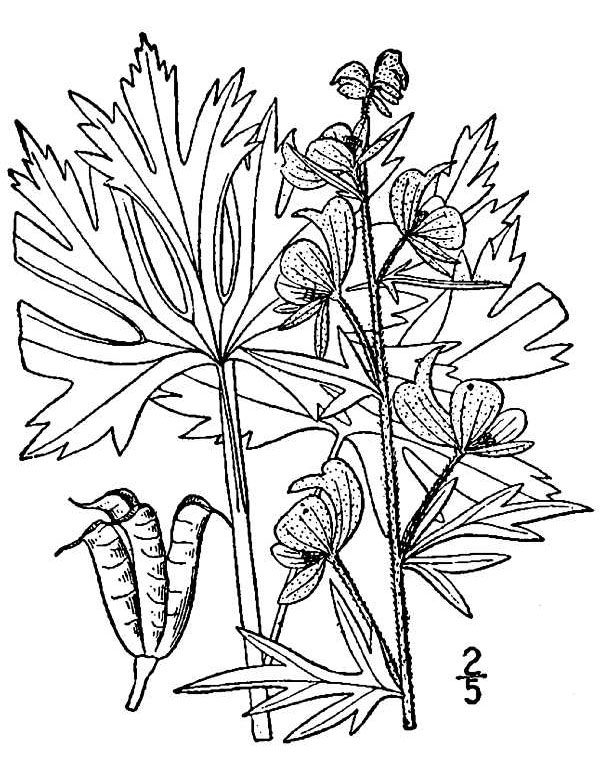
Northern blue monkshood (Aconitum noveboracense)

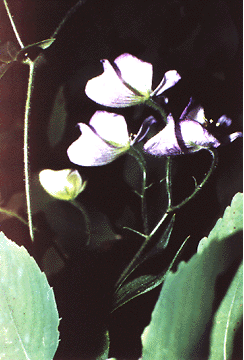
Northern monkshood, white phase

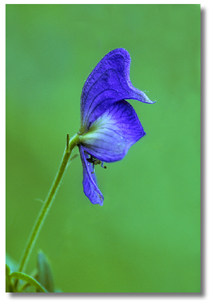
Northern monkshood, blue phase
