= List of Wisconsin state parks =

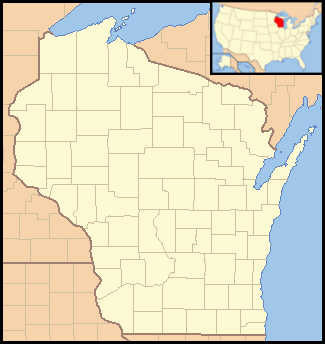
Map of State Parks of Wisconsin
Hold cursor over locations to display park name;
click to go to park article.

A Wisconsin state park is an area of land in the U.S. state of Wisconsin preserved by the state for its natural, historic, or other resources. The state park system in Wisconsin includes both state parks and state recreation areas. Wisconsin currently has 50 state park units, covering more than 60,570 acres (245.1 km^{2}) in state parks and state recreation areas. Each unit was created by an act of the Wisconsin Legislature and is maintained by the Wisconsin Department of Natural Resources, Division of Parks and Recreation. The Division of Forestry manages a further 471,329 acres (1,907.40 km^{2}) in Wisconsin's state forests.

Several Wisconsin state parks contain resources that have been recognized on a national level. Chippewa Moraine State Recreation Area, Devil's Lake State Park, and Interstate State Park are units of the Ice Age National Scientific Reserve, while the Wyalusing Hardwood Forest in Wyalusing State Park is a National Natural Landmark. Two Wisconsin state parks contain National Historic Landmarks, both of which are Native American archaeological sites: Aztalan and Copper Culture. 15 state parks contain a total of 23 separate listings on the National Register of Historic Places (NRHP). These are the two previously mentioned National Historic Landmarks, plus Lake Farms Archaeological District at Capital Springs State Recreation Area, Copper Falls State Park, six individual buildings at Heritage Hill State Historical Park (Baird Law Office, Cotton House, Fort Howard Hospital, Fort Howard Officers' Quarters, Fort Howard Ward Building, and Tank Cottage), High Cliff Mounds at High Cliff State Park, the Seth Peterson Cottage in Mirror Lake State Park, the Raddatz Rockshelter at Natural Bridge State Park, Stonefield partially within Nelson Dewey State Park, Eagle Bluff Lighthouse in Peninsula State Park, the Roche-a-Cri Petroglyphs in Roche-a-Cri State Park, the shot tower in Tower Hill State Park, Whitefish Dunes-Bay View Site in Whitefish Dunes State Park, Wyalusing State Park Mounds Archaeological District in Wyalusing State Park, and four listings in Rock Island State Park: the Pottawatomie Lighthouse, Rock Island Historic District, Thordarson Estate Historic District, and a water tower.

== History ==
Wisconsin became the first state to have a state park in 1878 when it formed "The State Park". The park consisted of 760 square miles (2,000 km^{2}) in northern Wisconsin (most of present-day Vilas County). The state owned 50,631 acres (205 km^{2}), which was less than 10% of the total area. There were few residents in the area. Lumber barons were powerful in the area, and they purchased two-thirds of the state's land at $8 per acre. This defeated the purpose of the parks for it didn't save the land from the ax.

In 1895, the state legislature created an act which authorized the state governor to examine some land in Polk County at the Dalles of the St. Croix River to become a state park. In 1899, the legislature approved the purchase of Interstate State Park and it was established on September 20, 1900. Architect John Nolen was hired in 1907 to draft a feasibility plan for a Wisconsin State Parks System and State Parks for Wisconsin was released later that year. The report was the guideline used to set up the state park system. It recommended the creation of four state parks: Dells of the Wisconsin River, Devil's Lake, Door County's Fish Creek (now Peninsula State Park) and the confluence of the Mississippi and Wisconsin Rivers (now Wyalusing State Park). Three became state parks, and the fourth became Dells Natural Area in 2005. A State Conservation Commission was formed in 1915 by combining the State Park Board, the State Board of Forestry, the Fisheries Commission, and the state Game Warden Department.

== List of Wisconsin state parks and recreation areas ==
| Name | County | Size | | Estab- lished | Water body | Remarks |
| Name | County | acres | ha | Estab- lished | Water body | Remarks |
|---|---|---|---|---|---|---|
| Amnicon Falls State Park | Douglas | 828 | 335 | 1961 | Amnicon River | Contains a series of waterfalls and a historic covered bridge. |
| Aztalan State Park | Jefferson | 172 | 70 | 1947 | Crawfish River | Interprets a partially reconstructed Mississippian culture village that flourished 1000–1300 CE. The site is a National Historic Landmark. |
| Belmont Mound State Park | Lafayette | | | 1961 | None | Features a 64-foot (20 m) observation tower atop a 400-foot (120 m) hill. Operated by the Belmont Lions Club. |
| Big Bay State Park | Ashland | 2,418 | 979 | 1963 | Lake Superior | Includes a 1.5-mile (2.4 km) beach on Madeline Island, largest of the Apostle Islands. |
| Big Foot Beach State Park | Walworth | 272 | 110 | 1949 | Geneva Lake | Offers camping and fishing adjacent to a 100-foot (30 m) beach. |
| Blue Mound State Park | Dane | 1,153 | 467 | 1959 | Ryan Creek | Contains observation towers atop the highest point in southern Wisconsin and the state park system's only swimming pool. |
| Brunet Island State Park | Chippewa | 1,225 | 496 | 1936 | Chippewa and Fisher Rivers | Preserves a 179-acre (72 ha) island and backwater channels popular with canoeists. |
| Buckhorn State Park | Juneau | 6,990 | 2,830 | 1971 | Castle Rock Lake | Protects a scenic peninsula on a reservoir formed at the confluence of the Wisconsin and Yellow Rivers. |
| Campbellsport Drumlins State Park | Fond du Lac | 3,600 | 1,500 | 1971 | None | A unit of the Ice Age National Scientific Reserve. |
| Capital Springs State Recreation Area | Dane | 3,000 | 1,200 | 2000 | Lake Waubesa | Encompasses park properties just south of Madison unified in the centennial year of the state park system. A Native American archaeological site is on the NRHP. |
| Chippewa Moraine State Recreation Area | Chippewa | 3,272 | 1,324 | 1971 | Numerous kettle lakes | Interprets varied glacial landforms. The park is a unit of the Ice Age National Scientific Reserve. |
| Copper Culture State Park | Oconto | 42 | 17 | 1959 | Oconto River | Interprets a burial ground used by the Old Copper Culture from 3000 to 2000 BCE. The site is a National Historic Landmark. |
| Copper Falls State Park | Ashland | 3,068 | 1,242 | 1929 | Bad River | Contains 7.5 miles (12.1 km) of the Bad River, including a 2-mile (3.2 km) gorge with several waterfalls. The park is listed on the NRHP. |
| Council Grounds State Park | Lincoln | 509 | 206 | 1938 | Wisconsin River | Lies on a riverbank where Native Americans were said to have once held councils. |
| Cross Plains State Park | Dane | 1,500 | 610 | 1971 | None | A unit of the Ice Age National Scientific Reserve. Consists of land owned by Dane County, the Wisconsin Department of Natural Resources, the National Park Service, and the United States Fish and Wildlife Service. |
| Devil's Lake State Park | Sauk | 10,200 | 4,100 | 1911 | Devil's Lake | Protects a 360-acre (150 ha) endorheic lake in the Baraboo Range, hemmed in by moraines and 500-foot (150 m) quartzite bluffs. The park is a unit of the Ice Age National Scientific Reserve. |
| Fischer Creek State Recreation Area | Manitowoc | 124 | 50 | 1991 | Lake Michigan | Preserves a mile of shoreline flanking the mouth of Fischer Creek. Managed by the Manitowoc County Park System. |
| Governor Dodge State Park | Iowa | 5,270 | 2,130 | 1948 | Two man-made lakes | Preserves Driftless Area topography in memory of Henry Dodge, settler and first governor of the Wisconsin Territory. |
| Governor Nelson State Park | Dane | 422 | 171 | 1975 | Lake Mendota | Contains a 500-foot (150 m) beach, restored prairie, and ancient Indian mounds. |
| Governor Thompson State Park | Marinette | 2,600 | 1,100 | 2000 | Peshtigo River, Woods Lake | In development around a series of lakes and streams. |
| Grand Traverse Island State Park | Door | 5.05 | 2.04 | 1970 | Lake Michigan | Protects 5 acres (2.0 ha) of land on Detroit Island. There is currently a movement for this and surrounding lands to be established as a national lakeshore. |
| Harrington Beach State Park | Ozaukee | 637 | 258 | 1966 | Lake Michigan | Features a mile-long beach, a white cedar swamp, and a 26-acre (11 ha) quarry lake. |
| Hartman Creek State Park | Waupaca and Portage | 1,417 | 573 | 1962 | Hartman Creek, seven lakes | |
| Heritage Hill State Historical Park | Brown | 48 | 19 | 1973 | Fox River | Comprises an open-air museum of 25 historical structures and over 11,000 artifacts managed by a non-profit organization. Six of the buildings are on the NRHP. |
| High Cliff State Park | Calumet | 1,147 | 464 | 1954 | Lake Winnebago | Straddles the cliff of the Niagara Escarpment on the northeast shore of Wisconsin's largest lake. A group of effigy mounds is on the NRHP. |
| Hoffman Hills State Recreation Area | Dunn | 707 | 286 | 1980 | None | Features trails and a 60-foot (18 m) observation tower among hills covered in forest, prairie, and wetlands. |
| Holzhueter Farm Conservation Park | Jefferson | 175 | 71 | 2009 | None | Under development. Managed by Jefferson County, owned by the Wisconsin Department of Natural Resources |
| Interstate State Park | Polk | 1,330 | 540 | 1900 | St. Croix River, Lake O' the Dalles | Preserves a basalt river gorge jointly with an adjacent state park in Minnesota. The park is within the Saint Croix National Scenic Riverway and the Ice Age National Scientific Reserve and contains the western terminus of the Ice Age Trail. |
| Kinnickinnic State Park | Pierce | 1,239 | 501 | 1972 | St. Croix and Kinnickinnic Rivers | Offers boat-in camping and overlooks at the sandy river delta at the mouth of the Kinnickinnic. |
| Kohler-Andrae State Park | Sheboygan | 988 | 400 | 1928 | Lake Michigan, Black River | Preserves dunes, golden sand beaches, and pine woodland. |
| Lake Kegonsa State Park | Dane | 343 | 139 | 1962 | Lake Kegonsa | Adjoins a 3,209-acre (1,299 ha) glacial lake in rural Dane County. |
| Lake Wissota State Park | Chippewa | 1,062 | 430 | 1962 | Lake Wissota | Features forest, prairie, and a 285-foot (87 m) swimming beach on a reservoir of the Chippewa River (Wisconsin). |
| Lakeshore State Park | Milwaukee | 22 | 8.9 | 1998 | Lake Michigan | Provides urban green space on Milwaukee's lakefront. |
| Lizard Mound State Park | Washington | 22 | 8.9 | 2022 | None | Contains 28 effigy mounds in excellent states of preservation, walking trails and interpretive signage. Originally established as a State Park in 1950, it was taken over by Washington County in 1986. It was deeded back to the state in 2021 and redesignated a State Park in 2022. |
| Menominee River State Park and Recreation Area | Marinette | 6,563 | 2,656 | 2010 | Menominee River | Protects several miles of the Menominee River in conjunction with Michigan's Menominee River State Recreation Area. |
| Merrick State Park | Buffalo | 320 | 130 | 1932 | Mississippi River | Offers fishing and boating on quiet backwaters of the Mississippi. |
| Mill Bluff State Park | Monroe and Juneau | 1,337 | 541 | 1936 | Unnamed swimming pond | Contains unusual steep sandstone bluffs that formed as islands in Glacial Lake Wisconsin. |
| Mirror Lake State Park | Sauk | 2,179 | 882 | 1962 | Mirror Lake | Surrounds a reservoir whose wooded shores and 50-foot (15 m) cliffs often keep the water mirror-smooth. The Seth Peterson Cottage designed by Frank Lloyd Wright is on the NRHP. |
| Natural Bridge State Park | Sauk | 530 | 210 | 1972 | None | Contains the largest natural arch in the state and an NRHP-listed rock shelter once used by Paleo-Indians. |
| Nelson Dewey State Park | Grant | 756 | 306 | 1935 | Mississippi River | Encompasses a 500-foot (200 m) river bluff that was once part of the estate of Nelson Dewey, Wisconsin's first governor. Stonefield estate is on the NRHP. |
| New Glarus Woods State Park | Green | 431 | 174 | 1934 | Little Sugar River branch | Preserves mature forest and restored prairie. |
| Newport State Park | Door | 2,373 | 960 | 1964 | Lake Michigan | Comprises Wisconsin's only wilderness-designated park. |
| Pattison State Park | Douglas | 1,476 | 597 | 1920 | Black River | Contains 165-foot (50 m) Big Manitou Falls, the highest waterfall in Wisconsin and the fourth-highest east of the Rocky Mountains. |
| Peninsula State Park | Door | 3,776 | 1,528 | 1909 | Green Bay | Contains a golf course, summer theater, group camps, and lighthouse on nearly 7 miles (11 km) of shoreline on the Door Peninsula. The 1868 Eagle Bluff Lighthouse is on the NRHP. |
| Perrot State Park | Trempealeau | 1,270 | 510 | 1918 | Mississippi and Trempealeau Rivers | Features 500-foot-high (200 m) bluffs bearing rare goat prairie communities on their southwestern faces. |
| Potawatomi State Park | Door | 1,225 | 496 | 1928 | Sturgeon Bay | Protects steep-to-sheer shoreline on the Door Peninsula. |
| Rib Mountain State Park | Marathon | 1,528 | 618 | 1927 | None | Straddles 1,924-foot (586 m) Rib Mountain, one of the highest points in Wisconsin. |
| Richard Bong State Recreation Area | Kenosha | 4,515 | 1,827 | 1963 | Several small lakes | Supports recreational activities, including ATVs, falconry, hunting and sled dog training, and model aircraft on the site of the abortive R.I. Bong Air Force Base. |
| Roche-a-Cri State Park | Adams | 604 | 244 | 1948 | Little Roche-a-Cri Creek | Contains a 300-foot (91 m) outcropping bearing the NRHP-listed Roche-a-Cri Petroglyphs. |
| Rock Island State Park | Door | 912 | 369 | 1965 | Lake Michigan | Encompasses most of vehicle-free Rock Island, accessed by two ferry rides at the tip of the Door Peninsula. Four listings are on the NRHP, including the 1836 Pottawatomie Lighthouse and inventor Chester Thordarson's 20th-century estate. |
| Rocky Arbor State Park | Juneau | 225 | 91 | 1932 | Unnamed creek | Preserves sandstone outcroppings similar to the nearby Dells of the Wisconsin River along one of the river's former channels. |
| Straight Lake State Park | Polk | 2,780 | 1,130 | 2002 | Straight Lake | In development around a lake surrounded by mature forest and glacial landforms. |
| Tower Hill State Park | Iowa | 77 | 31 | 1922 | Wisconsin River | Interprets a reconstructed shot tower where lead shot was manufactured 1832–1860. The tower is on the NRHP. |
| Whitefish Dunes State Park | Door | 863 | 349 | 1967 | Lake Michigan, Clark Lake | Protects dunes that formed across the mouth of a bay. A district of eight habitation sites dating from 100 BCE to 1800 CE are on the NRHP. |
| Wildcat Mountain State Park | Vernon | 3,643 | 1,474 | 1948 | Kickapoo River | Comprises a steep ridge overlooking the Kickapoo Valley. |
| Willow River State Park | St. Croix | 2,891 | 1,170 | 1967 | Willow River | Contains a waterfall in a sandstone gorge and a 172-acre (70 ha) lake. |
| Wyalusing State Park | Grant | 2,628 | 1,064 | 1917 | Mississippi and Wisconsin Rivers | Occupies a 500-foot-high (150 m) bluff overlooking the confluence of the Wisconsin and Mississippi Rivers. The park's hardwood forest is a National Natural Landmark and a district of prehistoric mounds is on the NRHP. |
| Yellowstone Lake State Park | Lafayette | 968 | 392 | 1970 | Yellowstone Lake | Surrounds a 455-acre (184 ha) reservoir built in the lake-poor Driftless Area. |

== List of former Wisconsin state parks ==
| Park name | County or counties | Area | | Year founded | Year closed | Body of water | Remarks |
| Park name | County or counties | acres | ha | Year founded | Year closed | Body of water | Remarks |
|---|---|---|---|---|---|---|---|
| Lost Dauphin State Park | Brown | 19 | 7.7 | 1947 | 1974 | Fox River | Surrounded the cabin site of Eleazar Williams, once rumored to be the Lost Dauphin. The state still owns the land (as of 2017), now known as Lost Dauphin Park. |
| Old Wade House State Park | Sheboygan | 240 | 97 | 1953 | 1992 | Mullet River | Now run by the Wisconsin Historical Society as the Wade House Historic Site |

== See also ==
- List of Wisconsin state forests
