= Ice Age National Scientific Reserve =

Multi-unit protected area in Wisconsin, USA

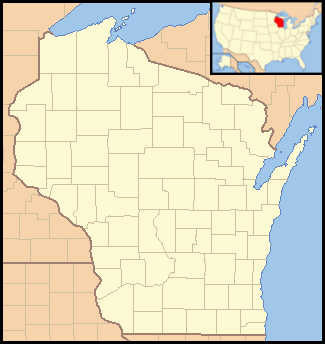
Ice Age National Scientific Reserve
Hold cursor over locations to display park name;
click to go to unit article.

The Ice Age National Scientific Reserve is an affiliated area of the National Park System of the United States comprising nine sites in Wisconsin that preserve geological evidence of glaciation. To protect the scientific and scenic value of the landforms, the U.S. Congress authorized the creation of a cooperative reserve in 1964. The scientific reserve was established in 1971 and today encompasses some 32,500 acres (13,200 ha). The landforms are the result of the Wisconsin glaciation during the last glacial period, which lasted from about 110,000 to 10,000 years ago.

The nine units of the reserve, mostly Wisconsin state parks or other protected areas, are administered by the Wisconsin Department of Natural Resources. Several units are not yet developed for visitation, having only minimal trails and no interpretive installations. Planning was underway as of 2012 for the future development and management of the Cross Plains unit. Several of the sites are joined by the Ice Age National Scenic Trail, but the reserve is a separate entity. Units of the reserve that charge state park access fees also accept federal passes.

== Units ==
Site Name	Location	Geologic features	Recreation
Campbellsport Drumlins State Park	Campbellsport	Drumlins	Scenic drive
Chippewa Moraine State Recreation Area	New Auburn	Kettle lakes and ponds, stagnant ice terrain, ice-walled lake plains	Interpretive center, camping, and trails
Cross Plains State Park	Cross Plains	Driftless Zone topography, glacial lakes, gorge	Trails
Devil's Lake State Park	Baraboo	Large kettle lake, terminal moraine	Interpretive center, camping, non-motorized boating, trails, swimming, picnicking
Horicon Marsh State Wildlife Area	Horicon	Extinct glacial lake, drumlin	interpretive Center, Wildlife viewing, trails, boating, picnicking
Interstate State Park	St. Croix Falls	Dalles of the St. Croix River, glacial potholes	Interpretive center, camping, non-motorized boating, trails, swimming, picnicking, fishing
Kettle Moraine State Forest, Northern Unit	Glenbeulah and Kewaskum	Kettle Moraine, kames, eskers, kettle lakes	Interpretive center, camping, boating, trails, swimming, picnicking
Mill Bluff State Park	Camp Douglas	Former islands and lakebed of Glacial Lake Wisconsin	Camping, trails, swimming, picnicking
Two Creeks Buried Forest State Natural Area	Two Creeks	Exposed stratum with floral remains	Undeveloped
