= Hoffman Hills State Recreation Area =

State park in Dunn County, Wisconsin

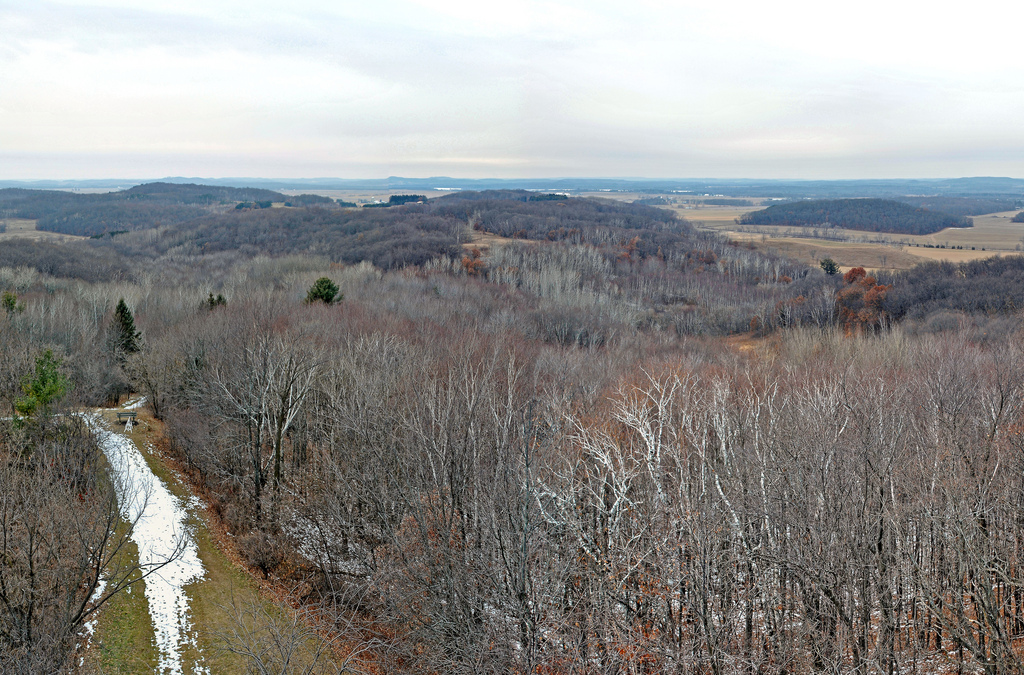
- View from the observation tower

- Location within Wisconsin Location within the United States
- Interactive map of Hoffman Hills State Recreation Area
- Location: Dunn County, Wisconsin, United States
- Coordinates: 44°56′45″N 91°46′37″W
- Area: 707 acres (286 ha)
- Established: 1980
- Administrator: Wisconsin Department of Natural Resources
- Website: Official website
- Wisconsin State Parks

Hoffman Hills State Recreation Area is a 707-acre (286 ha) unit of the Wisconsin state park system near Menomonie. A network of trails provides access to wooded hills, prairie, and wetlands. There are parking areas, picnic areas and a 60-foot (18 m) observation tower accessible by trail. Visitors are allowed to gather edible mushrooms, nuts, and berries, and deer hunting is allowed in November during Wisconsin's 9-day gun season.
