= Amnicon Falls State Park =

State park in Douglas County, Wisconsin

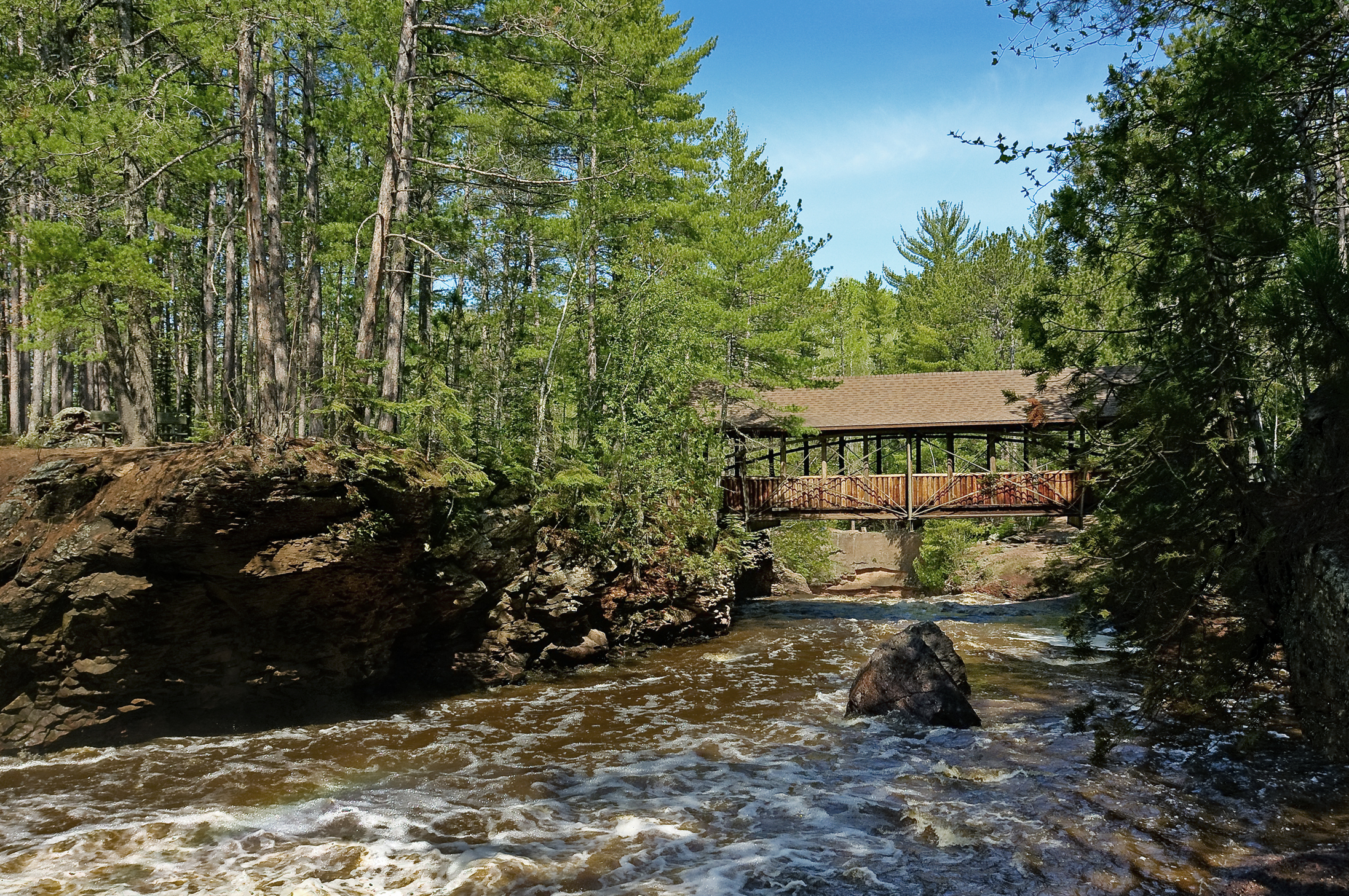
- The park's signature covered bridge

- Location within Wisconsin Location within the United States
- Interactive map of Amnicon Falls State Park
- Location: Douglas County, Wisconsin, United States
- Coordinates: 46°36′50″N 91°53′58″W
- Area: 828 acres (335 ha)
- Elevation: 742 ft (226 m)
- Established: 1961
- Administrator: Wisconsin Department of Natural Resources
- Website: Official website
- Wisconsin State Parks

Amnicon Falls State Park is a state park of Wisconsin, United States. The 828-acre (335 ha) park is located in South Range, Wisconsin, southeast of the city of Superior. It features a series of waterfalls on the Amnicon River as it flows around a small island and under a historic covered bridge.

== History ==
The park was founded as Bardon Park in 1932. It expanded in size through land purchases by the Town of Amnicon in the 1950s. The park was transferred to the State of Wisconsin in 1961 and 1965 by Douglas County and the Town of Amnicon, respectively, with the state eventually expanding the size of the park by another 138 acres (56 ha).

== Activities and amenities ==
The falls are divided into Upper and Lower Falls areas, and swimming is allowed at both. The park's 1.8 miles (2.9 km) of trails include paths along both banks of the river and a snowshoeing trail into remoter park areas. The park has 36 campsites, two walk-in and one accessible to persons with disabilities.
