= Menominee River State Park and Recreation Area =

State park in Marinette County, Wisconsin

- Location within Wisconsin Location within the United States
- Interactive map of Menominee River State Park and Recreation Area
- Location: Marinette County, Wisconsin, and Dickinson and Menominee counties, Michigan, United States
- Coordinates: 45°45′19″N 87°56′44″W
- Area: 7,652 acres (3,097 ha)
- Administrator: Wisconsin Department of Natural Resources
- Website: Official website
- Wisconsin State Parks

Menominee River State Park and Recreation Area is a state park unit of Wisconsin, United States, in development along the Menominee River. It was created in 2010 in conjunction with the Menominee River State Recreation Area on the Michigan side of the border river. The Wisconsin park is located in the towns of Niagara, Pembine, and Beecher in Marinette County in northeast Wisconsin. The 7,652-acre (3,097 ha) park comprises an undeveloped northern unit and a southern portion with primitive hiking trails and canoe/walk-in campsites.

== History ==
The two-state protected area began with donations of 1,922 acres (778 ha) and 2,530 acres (1,020 ha) given to Wisconsin and Michigan, respectively, in 1997 by the Richard King Mellon Foundation and The Conservation Fund. The state of Wisconsin purchased a further 2,714 acres (1,098 ha) from the Wisconsin Electric Power Company in 2010 and elevated the property to a state park and recreation area. The Wisconsin and Michigan parks are managed by their respective state Departments of Natural Resources. The current land management plan was approved by both groups and adopted in 2017.

== Recreation ==
From 13 miles (21 km) upriver on through the park the Menominee River is a wild and scenic route for canoes and kayaks. This stretch is largely broad and gentle, with a few rapids and a waterfall requiring portages. There are three non-reservable campsites along the river, accessible to paddlers or hikers. The river also supports fishing, particularly for smallmouth bass.

Currently there is only one maintained hiking trail, the primitive Pemene Falls Trail, which follows former logging roads in places. The park is open to deer hunting in season, and in winter to snowshoeing and cross-country skiing.
