= Merrick State Park =

State park in Buffalo County, Wisconsin

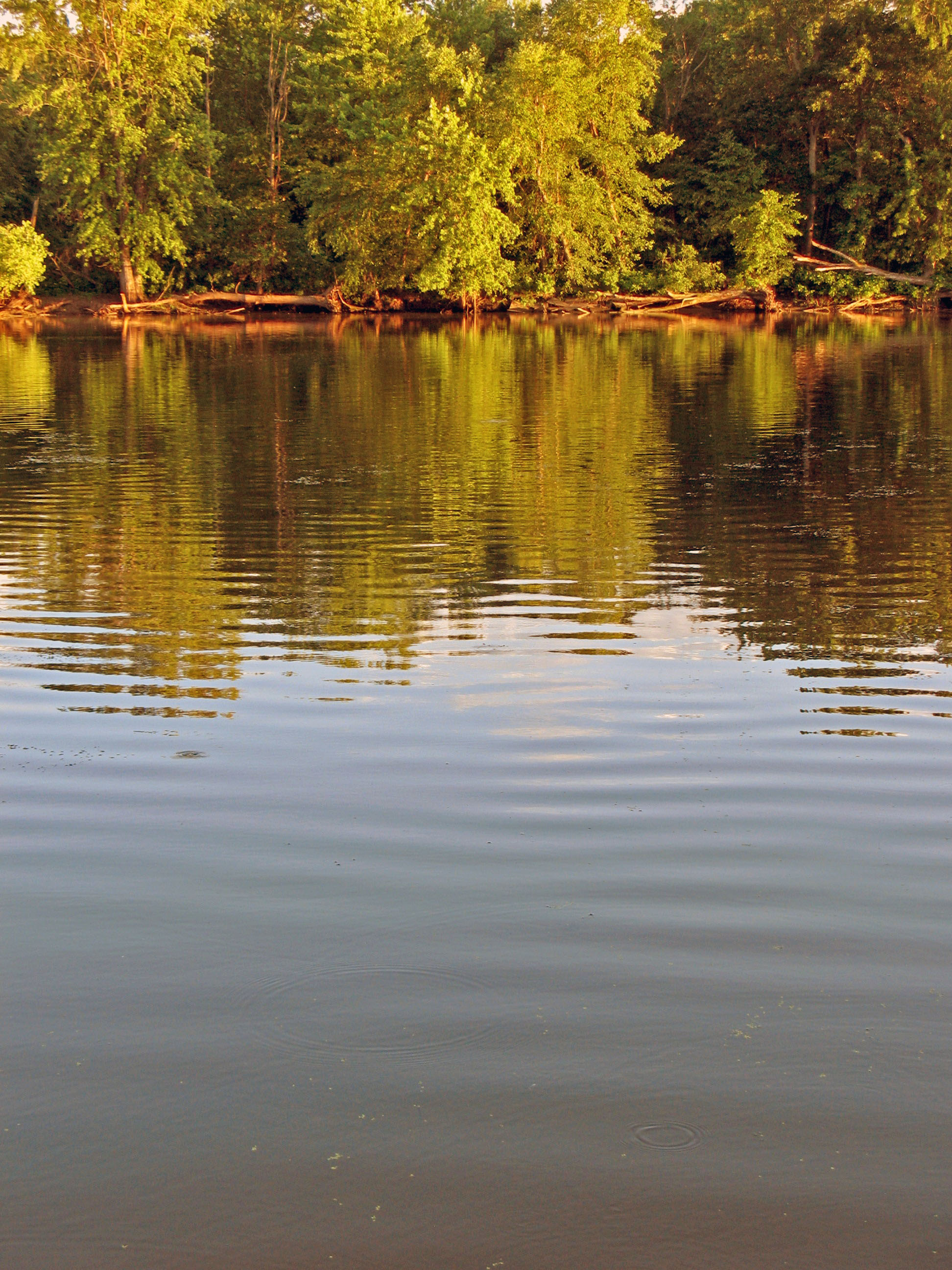

- Location within Wisconsin Location within the United States
- Interactive map of Merrick State Park
- Location: Buffalo County, Wisconsin, United States
- Coordinates: 44°9′16″N 91°45′17″W
- Area: 322 acres (130 ha)
- Established: 1932
- Administrator: Wisconsin Department of Natural Resources
- Named for: George Byron Merrick
- Website: Official website
- Wisconsin State Parks

Merrick State Park is a 322-acre (130 ha) Wisconsin state park on the Mississippi River north of Fountain City. The park is bordered by the lands and waters of the Upper Mississippi River National Wildlife and Fish Refuge.

== Activities and amenities ==
The park has three campgrounds with a total of 65 individual campsites. Two ramps accommodate both motorized and non-motorized boaters and fishermen. The park also has picnic grounds and a playground, hunting, cross-country skiing, and snowshoeing.

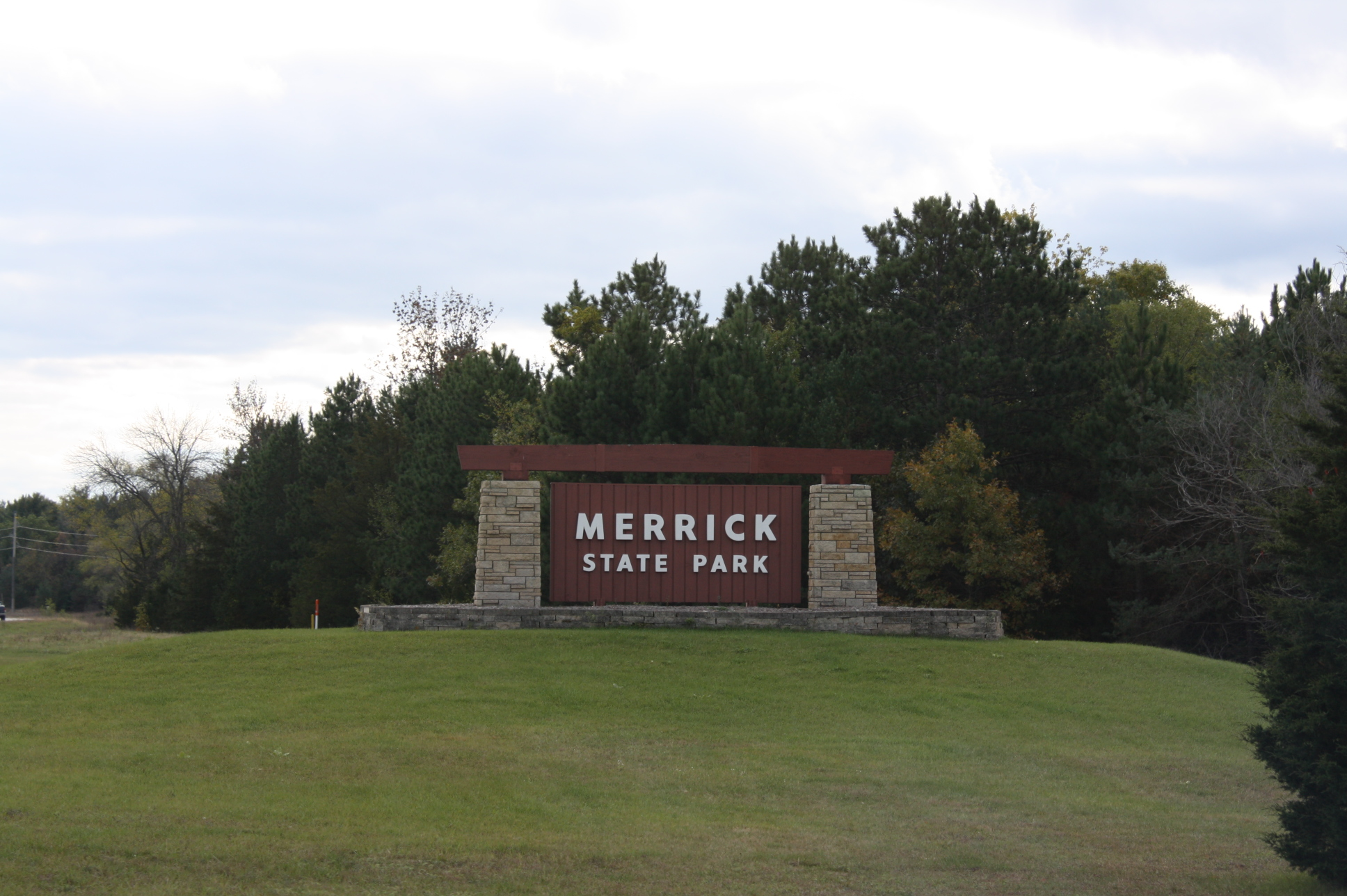
Sign along WIS 35

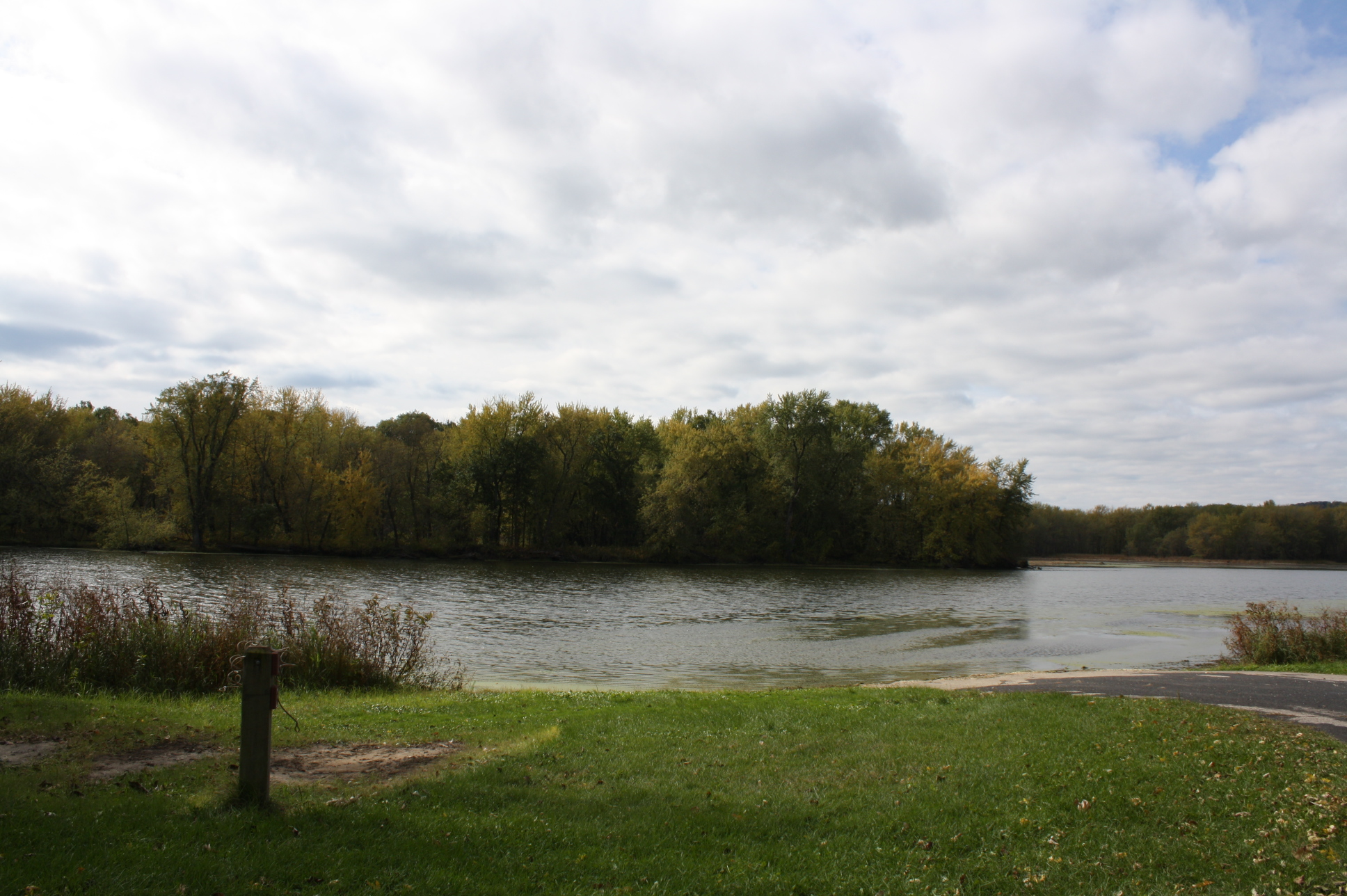
Mississippi River
