= Nelson Dewey State Park =

State park in Grant County, Wisconsin

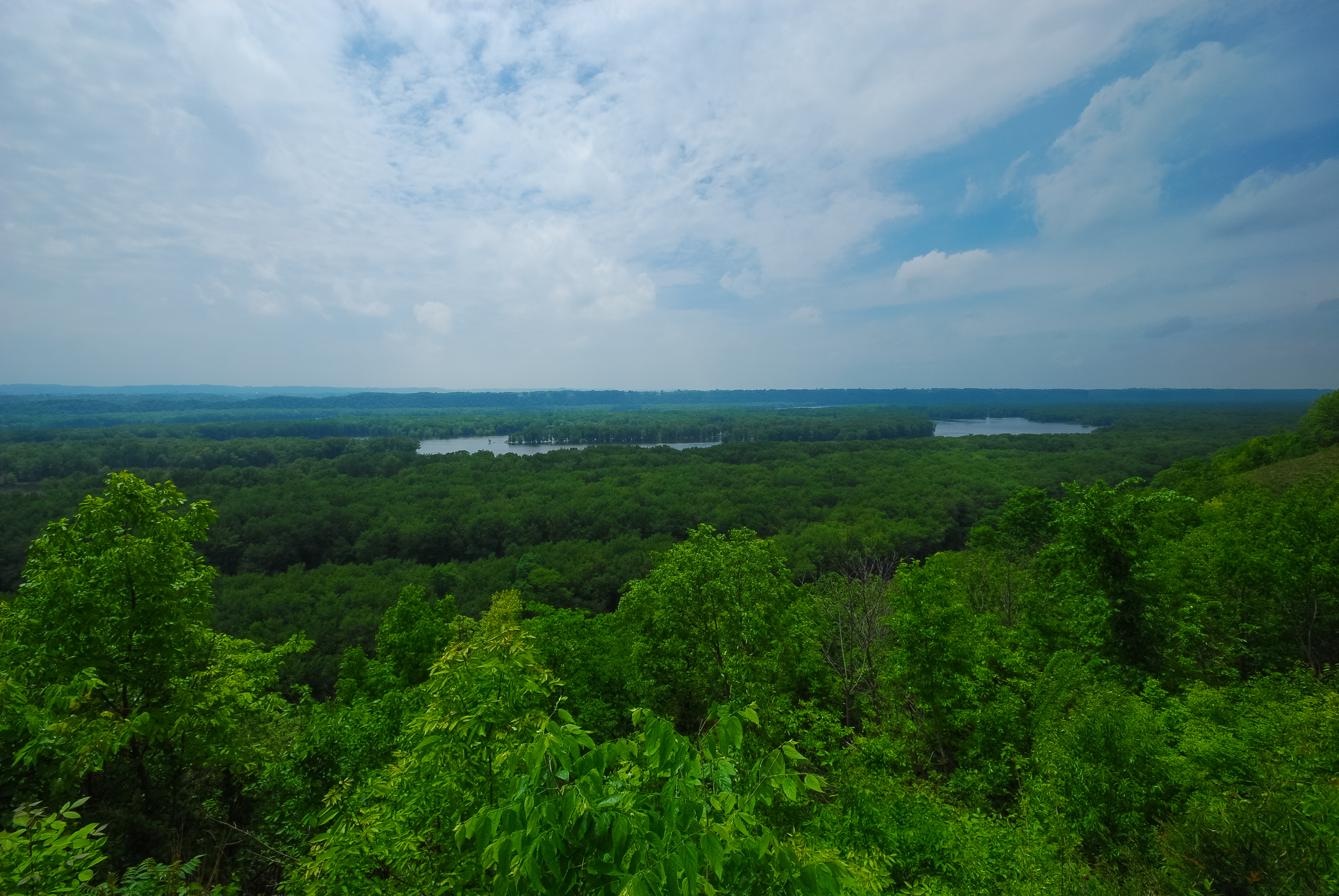
- Dewey Heights Prairie

- Location within Wisconsin Location within the United States
- Interactive map of Nelson Dewey State Park
- Location: Grant County, Wisconsin, United States
- Coordinates: 42°43′51″N 91°1′10″W
- Area: 756 acres (306 ha)
- Established: 1935
- Administrator: Wisconsin Department of Natural Resources
- Named for: Nelson Dewey
- Website: Official website
- Wisconsin State Parks

Nelson Dewey State Park is a 756-acre (306 ha) Wisconsin state park on the Mississippi River. The land was once part of the Stonefield estate of Nelson Dewey, the state's first governor.

== Activities and amenities ==
The park offers 2 miles (3.2 km) of hiking trails with bluff-top views of the Mississippi River Valley. Campground options included four walk-in sites located along the top of the bluffs.
