= Mill Bluff State Park =

State park in Monroe and Juneau counties, Wisconsin

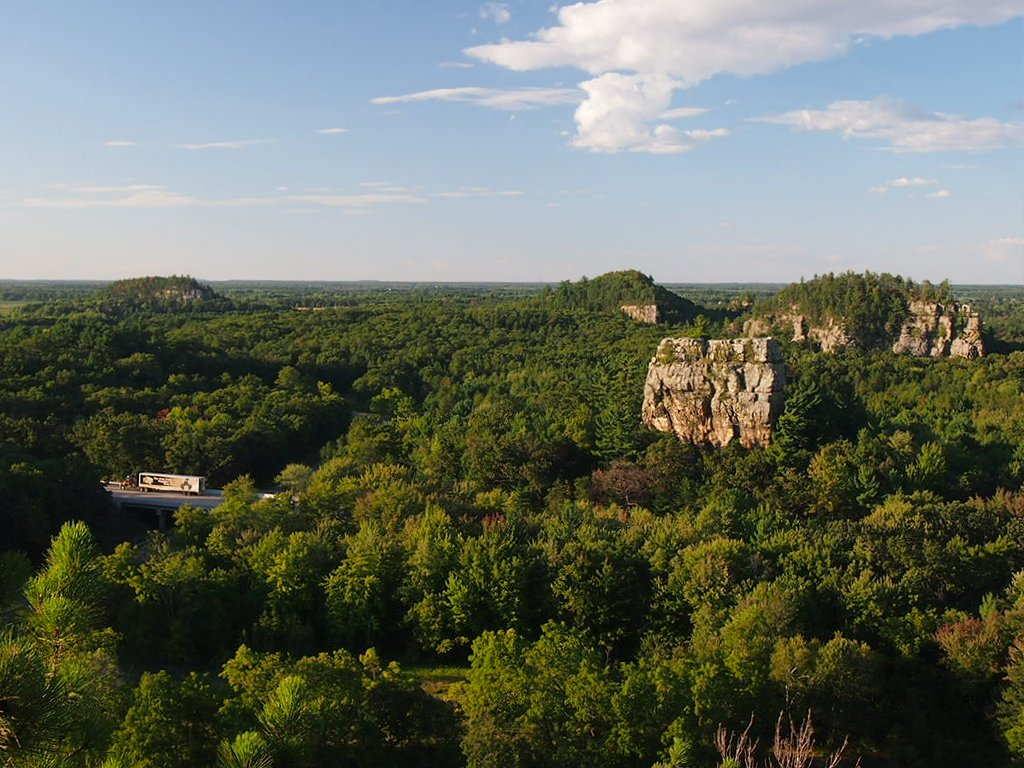
- The view north from Mill Bluff, with Wildcat Bluff on the left and the two humps of Camels Bluff on the right with Bee Bluff between them

- Location within Wisconsin Location within the United States
- Interactive map of Mill Bluff State Park
- Location: Monroe and Juneau counties, Wisconsin, United States
- Coordinates: 43°56′28″N 90°19′01″W
- Area: 1,337 acres (541 ha)
- Elevation: 1,122 ft (342 m)
- Established: 1937
- Administrator: Wisconsin Department of Natural Resources
- Visitors: 34,434 (DNR est.) (in 2024)
- Website: Official website
- Wisconsin State Parks

Mill Bluff State Park is a state park in west-central Wisconsin, United States. It is located in eastern Monroe and western Juneau counties, near the village of Camp Douglas. A unit of the Ice Age National Scientific Reserve, the park protects several prominent sandstone bluffs 80 feet (24 m) to 200 feet (61 m) high that formed as sea stacks 12,000 years ago in Glacial Lake Wisconsin. As a result, these bluffs are steep and angular, dissimilar to the rounded terrain more typical of the eastern half of the United States. The bluffs served as landmarks to both early pioneers and travelers today on Interstate 90/94, which passes through the park.

== Geography ==
There are ten named bluffs in the park. Mill Bluff, 120 feet (37 m) high, is between the interstate and U.S. Route 12. The park office is at its foot, and the campground is just to the west. Bee Bluff, although smaller and only 60 feet (18 m) high, is the most visible bluff from the interstate, as it stands adjacent to the westbound lanes. To the north is 170-foot (52 m) Camels Bluff, two separate outcroppings that together resemble the humps of a camel. Nearby are Devil's Monument and a 40-foot (12 m) high pinnacle called Cleopatra's Needle. The other, less accessible bluffs are Round Bluff and Sugar Bowl Bluff to the south, 140-foot (43 m) Wildcat Bluff and Bear Bluff to the north, and 199-foot (61 m) Long Bluff to the northeast. Also in the northeast is Ragged Rock, an 80-foot (24 m) tall former bluff whose protective cap was worn away and is eroding into a conical mound.

== Natural history ==
The bluffs in the park, and others nearby, are formed of Late Cambrian sandstone. Stratigraphically, the stone of the bluffs is part of the Galesville Member of the Dresbach Group. Sandstone from the Ironton Member of the Franconia Formation, which is more solidly concreted, tops each bluff. This capping layer helped protect the softer stone below it from erosion. Similar structures elsewhere in Wisconsin would have been bulldozed away by glaciers, but these bluffs lie in the Driftless Area; that part of the American Midwest which was never glaciated. The bluffs are all outliers of the Franconia Cuesta to the south.

During the last ice age a tongue of ice dammed the Wisconsin River, causing the water to back up into Glacial Lake Wisconsin. It is estimated that the lake was about 60 to 80 feet (18 to 24 m) deep in this area, so the taller bluffs became islands while the shorter ones would have been entirely underwater. For the 3000 years of the lake's existence waves eroded the edges of the bluffs, giving them their distinctive steep sides. Thus in a geological sense the bluffs are sea stacks because they formed in a body of water. In practice the larger formations are described as mesas, the medium-sized ones as buttes, and the smallest as a pinnacle.

The flat ground in the park consists of finely sorted sediments that settled to the bottom of Glacial Lake Wisconsin. Glacial erratics have been found on the former lakebed, which are explained as rocks which were embedded in icebergs that melted as they were floating in the lake.

The park is mostly forested, with northern pin oak, jack pine, red pine, eastern white pine, and white oak dominant.

== Cultural history ==
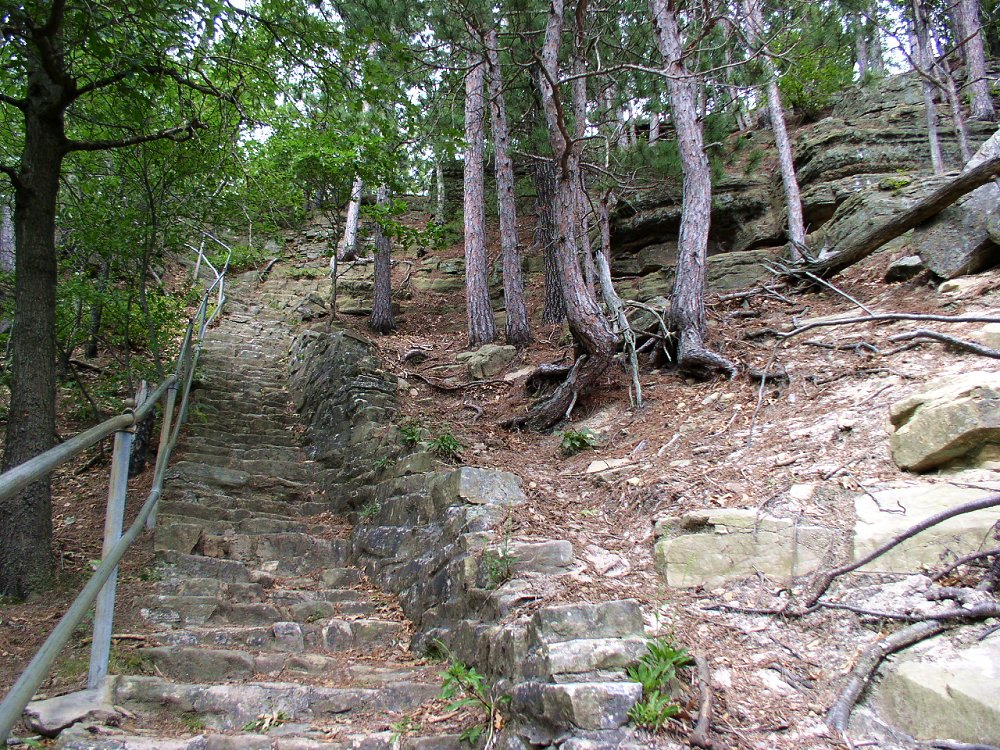
Stairs built by the Works Progress Administration up Mill Bluff

Several of the bluffs bear 400-year-old petroglyphs shaped like bird tracks, contemporaneous with the Roche-a-Cri Petroglyphs in Roche-a-Cri State Park.

The diaries and journals of west-bound settlers often mention these bluffs. A sawmill was operated in the vicinity, after which Mill Bluff was named.

Mill Bluff and a small area at its foot was proclaimed a state park on August 13, 1936. Mill Bluff State Park was added to the Ice Age National Scientific Reserve in May 1971. The park's boundaries were expanded to include the other bluffs later. In 2002 a portion of the park containing all of the major bluffs received a further level of protection as Mill Bluff State Natural Area.

== Recreation ==
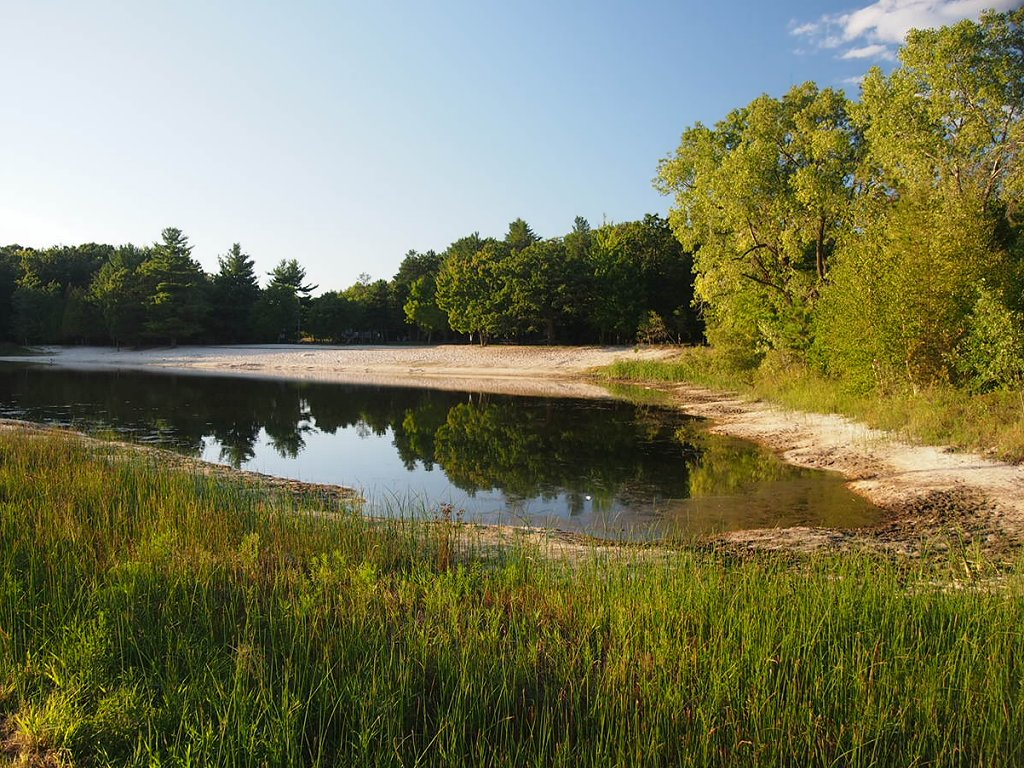
Mill Bluff State Park's swimming pond

Mill Bluff State Park is open from May to September. Small game hunting is permitted in sections of the park from November 1 to December 15, and deer hunting during a shorter period.

The park's small campground has 21 sites, 6 with electrical hookups. Amenities are primitive, with pit toilets and no showers. Potable water is available from hand pumps.

Swimming is available in a 2.5-acre (1.0 ha) spring-fed lake south of the campground. Sand has been added to make a 250-foot (76 m) beach.

A 0.4-mile (640 m) nature trail circles the base of Mill Bluff. A flight of 223 stone steps built by the Works Progress Administration in the 1930s lead to its top. 0.8 miles (1.3 km) north on County Road W (Funnel Road) is a pullout for the 1.25-mile (2.0 km) Camels Bluff loop trail, which passes between the two sections of Camels Bluff and leads past the base of Devils Monument and Cleopatra's Needle.

Because the bluffs are formed of soft sandstone and geologically unique, all climbing is prohibited.
