= Capital Springs State Recreation Area =

State Park in Dane County, Wisconsin

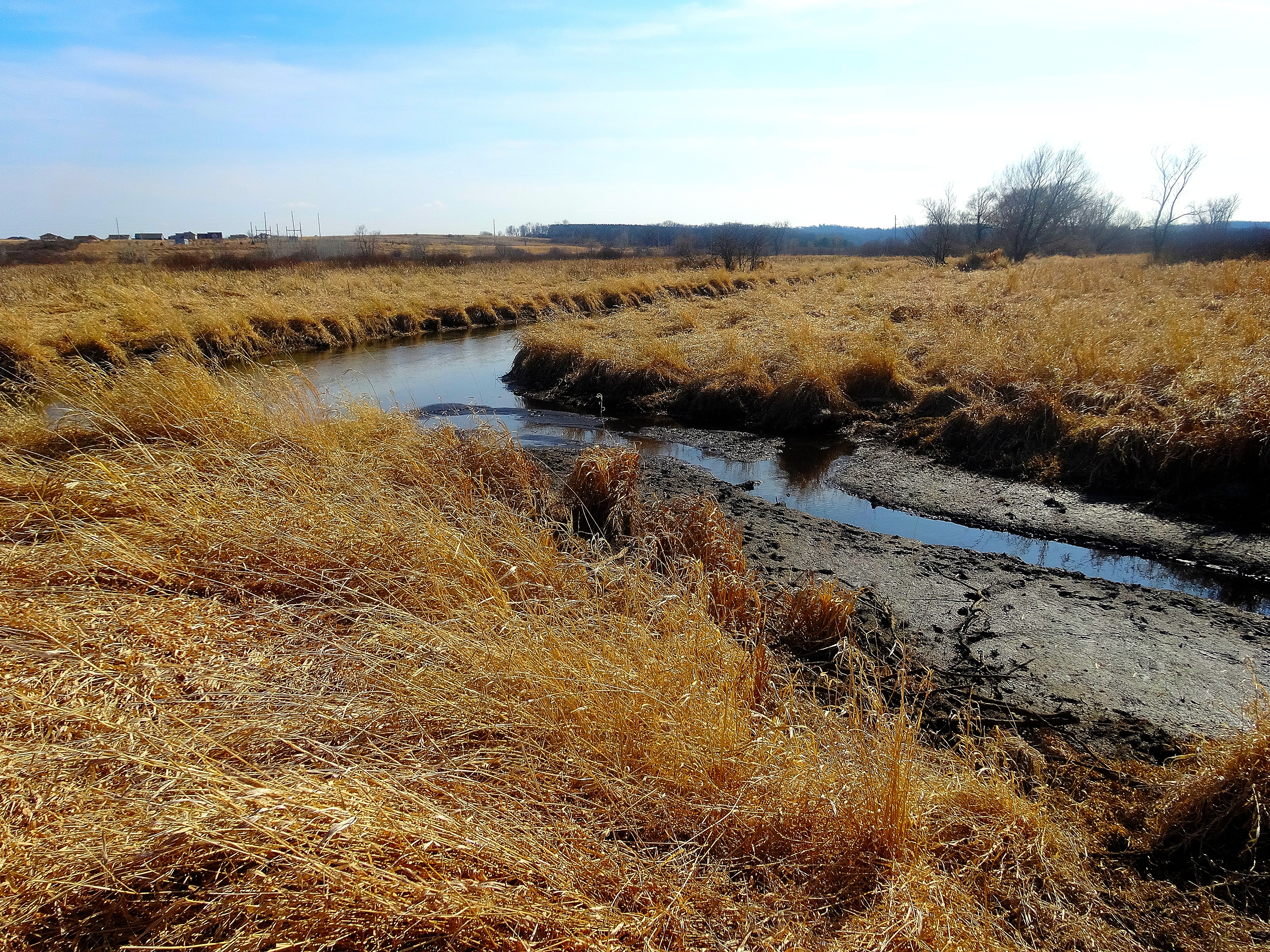

- Location within Wisconsin Location within the United States
- Interactive map of Capital Springs State Recreation Area
- Location: Dane County, Wisconsin, United States
- Coordinates: 43°1′46″N 89°20′14″W
- Area: 3,000 acres (1,200 ha)
- Elevation: 843 ft (257 m)
- Established: 2000
- Administrator: Wisconsin Department of Natural Resources
- Website: Official website
- Wisconsin State Parks

Capital Springs State Recreation Area is a state park unit of Wisconsin, United States, in development just south of Madison. The total area of the park is 3,000 acres (1,200 ha), with 326 acres (132 ha) designated as a state park. The park was authorized in 2000, the centennial of the Wisconsin state park system. The park includes 3,700 feet (1,100 m) of undeveloped shoreline on Lake Waubesa. The recreation area incorporates existing Dane County parks, and the site will be jointly managed by the state and the county.

The property includes Native American archaeological sites that were listed on the National Register of Historic Places in 1978 as Lake Farms Archaeological District. In this area near Lake Waubesa, Early Woodland people lived seasonally, leaving behind remains of fish, mammals, waterfowl, nuts, and pottery fragments.

== Activities and amenities ==
- Trails: The park offers 6 miles (9.7 km) of hiking trails and a 9-mile (14 km) section of the Capital City State Trail. Trails are groomed for cross-country skiing in winter.
- Boating, canoeing, and fishing are offered on Lake Waubesa. Picnic grounds are near the lake shore.
