= Fischer Creek State Recreation Area =

State park in Manitowoc County, Wisconsin

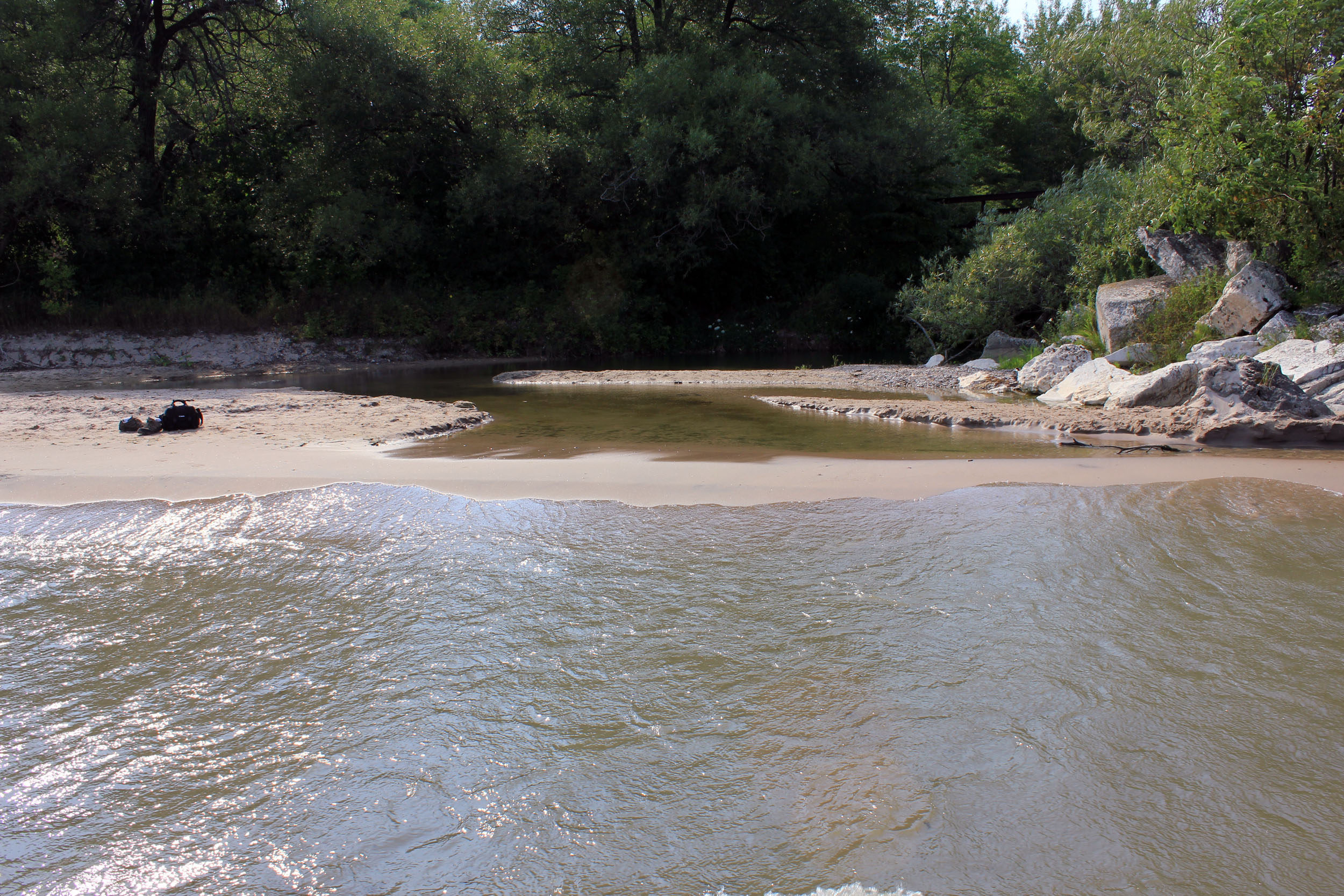
- Creek pouring into lake

- Location within Wisconsin Location within the United States
- Interactive map of Fischer Creek State Recreation Area
- Location: Manitowoc County, Wisconsin, United States
- Coordinates: 43°56′18″N 87°43′13″W
- Area: 160 acres (65 ha)
- Elevation: 581 ft (177 m)
- Established: 1991
- Administrator: Manitowoc County
- Website: Official website
- Wisconsin State Parks

Fischer Creek State Recreation Area is a state park unit of Wisconsin, United States. The 160-acre (65 ha) park preserves about a mile of shoreline on Lake Michigan flanking the mouth of Fischer Creek. The site is owned by the state but is developed and managed by the Manitowoc County Park System. Its development consists of trails and picnicking facilities.
