= Pattison State Park =

State Park in Douglas County, Wisconsin

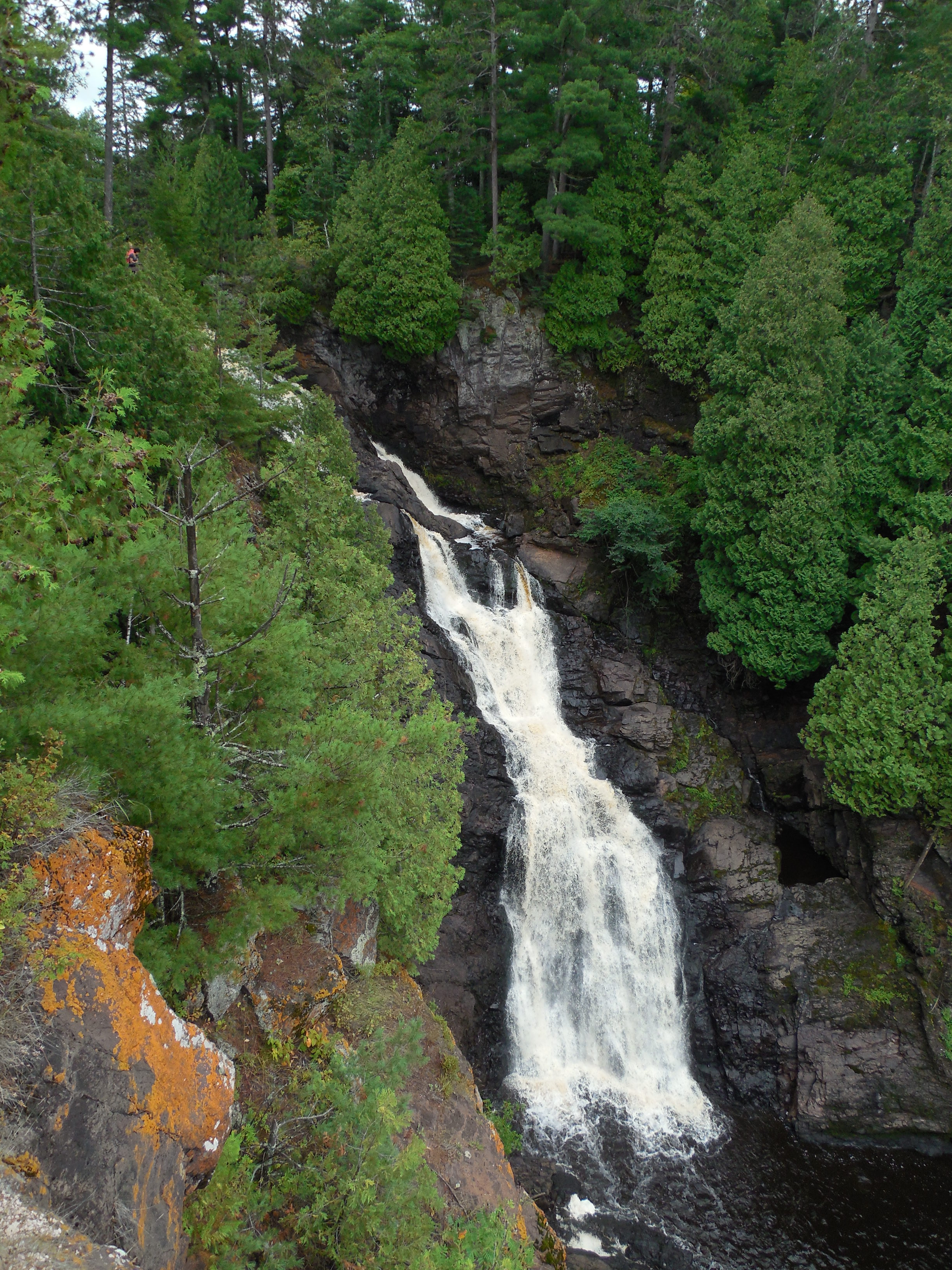
- Big Manitou Falls

- Location within Wisconsin Location within the United States
- Interactive map of Pattison State Park
- Location: Douglas County, Wisconsin, United States
- Coordinates: 46°31′36″N 92°07′20″W
- Area: 1,436 acres (581 ha)
- Established: 1920
- Administrator: Wisconsin Department of Natural Resources
- Named for: Martin Pattison
- Website: Official website
- Wisconsin State Parks

Pattison State Park is a state park in northwestern Douglas County, Wisconsin, United States. The 1,436-acre (581 ha) park is located on the Black River and contains both Big Manitou Falls, the highest waterfall in Wisconsin at 165 feet (50 m), and Little Manitou Falls, which is 30 feet (9.1 m). Pattison State Park was established in 1920. It is located 12 miles (19 km) south of downtown Superior.

== History ==
Pattison State Park is named after Martin Pattison, an early lumberman and miner. In 1879, the company he was working with moved to Superior. After becoming wealthy in the iron mining business, he purchased an entire city block on the harbor, where he built the 42-room Martin Pattison House, which is now the Fairlawn Mansion and Museum. In 1917, there was a plan to build a "power dam" on the Black River. The dam would have destroyed what is known as the Big Manitou Falls. Pattison took the initiative to save the falls by secretly buying land, 660 acres (270 ha) in total from different landowners along the river. In 1918, he donated the land to the state which led to Wisconsin dedicating its sixth state park to Martin Pattison on January 20, 1920.

Until 1935, Pattison State Park consisted of a small picnic area, some wooden overlooks, pit toilets, and a ranger cabin. On July 25, 1935, the Civilian Conservation Corps (CCC) began renewing the park. The Corps quarried rock and chiseled it into blocks to create the park shelter building, nature center, bathhouse, and former office building. It also drained Interfalls Lake, rerouted the river channel, hauled sand from Lake Superior's shore to make the beach, installed sewer and water systems, removed old roadbeds, planted trees, and landscaped and built three miles of foot trails.

== Activities and amenities ==
The park has a nature center and 300-foot (91 m) sand beach on Interfalls Lake. The park's 7 miles (11 km) of hiking trails include trails that are used for cross-country skiing and snowshoeing. Beaver Slide Nature Trail is 2 miles long and circles Interfalls Lake. Logging Camp Trail is 4.7 miles long from which some of the remains of Pattison's old logging camp by the Black River, can be seen. The park has 59 family campsites, 18 of them with electric hookups, and 3 backpack sites.
