= Two Creeks Buried Forest State Natural Area =

State Natural Area in Wisconsin

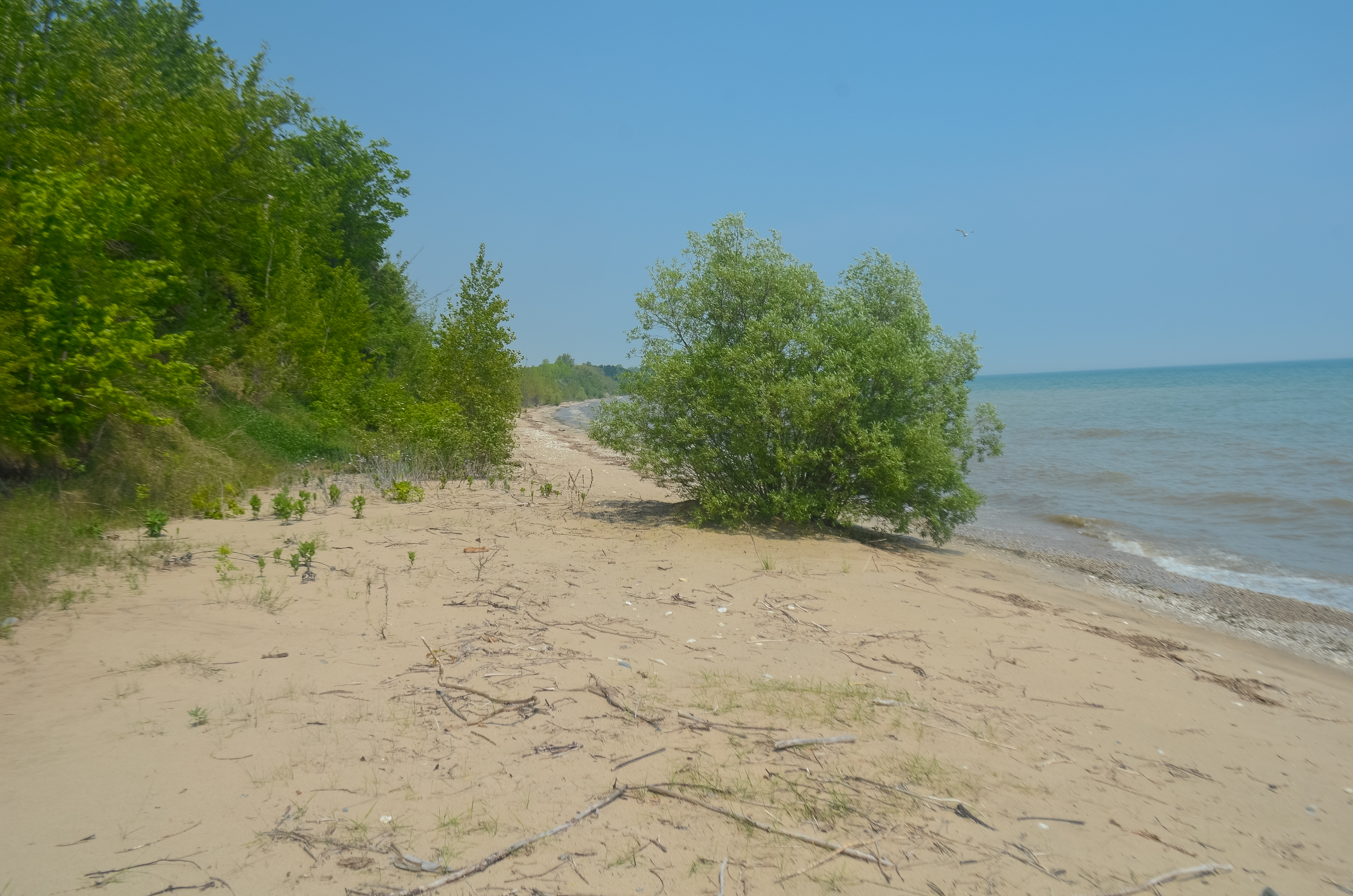
- Shoreline at Two Creeks Buried Forest SNA

- Location within Wisconsin Location within the United States
- Location: Manitowoc County, Wisconsin
- Coordinates: 44°19′39″N 87°32′41″W
- Area: 25 acres (10 ha)
- Elevation: 614 ft (187 m)
- Established: 1967
- Owner: Wisconsin Department of Natural Resources
- Website: Official website

Two Creeks Buried Forest State Natural Area is a site in the Wisconsin State Natural Areas Program and a unit of the Ice Age National Scientific Reserve. The site lies in the northeast corner of Manitowoc County on the shore of Lake Michigan north of Two Creeks, Wisconsin, United States. Periodically exposed in a steep lakeshore bluff is a stratum of sediment, known as the Two Creeks forest bed. It contains stumps, logs, branches, pine needles, pinecones, moss, and other forest litter and is sandwiched between layers of glacial till. This is an important site in Great Lakes geochronology because it firmly establishes the timeframe of advances and retreats during the last glacial period in this region.

As summarized in Rech and others, various studies have dated the buried logs and stumps from the Two Creeks forest using radiocarbon dating and analyzed their growth rings to determine a minimum lifespan for the forest. Initial research into the age of this buried forest indicated an calibrated age range of ~13,840–13,620 cal BP and a minimum lifespan for the forest of ~230 to 250 yr. Later research by Leavitt and others indicated a minimum lifespan of 329 yr for the Two Creeks and an age range of 13,760–13,530 cal BP.

The lower layer of glacial till was deposited during the end of the Woodfordian substage of the Wisconsin glaciation. The remains in the park demonstrate that a warmer interval, called the Twocreekan substage, followed in which the glacier retreated and a forest of spruce, pine, and hemlock grew. Then the climate cooled again and the Greatlakean substage began. A glacial tongue blocked Lake Michigan's drainage, causing the water level to rise and flood the forest, carrying in sediments which buried the forest floor. The glacier proceeded to flow over the forest, flattening it and ultimately depositing another layer of glacial till over it.

Two Creeks Buried Forest State Natural Area is open to visitation. There is an historical marker at the location. The site has no trails or displays, but visitors can park in the northwest corner of the site and wander freely across the grounds. Collection of any material is prohibited.
