= Chippewa Moraine State Recreation Area =

State park in Chippewa County, Wisconsin

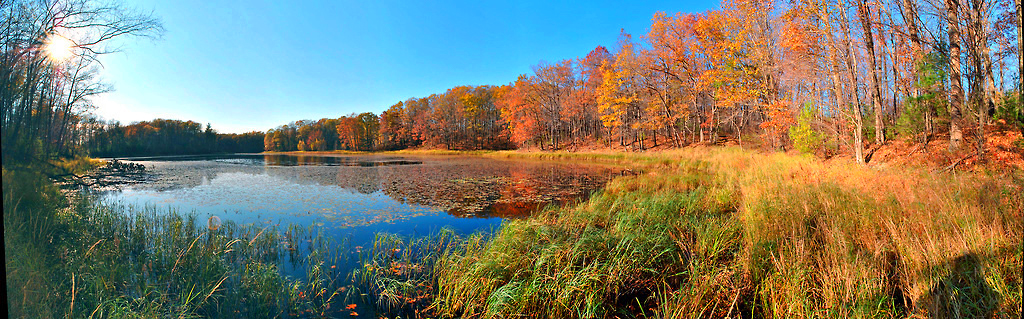

- Location within Wisconsin Location within the United States
- Interactive map of Chippewa Moraine State Recreation Area
- Location: Chippewa County, Wisconsin, United States
- Coordinates: 45°13′01″N 91°23′16″W
- Area: 3,063 acres (1,240 ha)
- Elevation: 1,089 ft (332 m)
- Established: 1974
- Administrator: Wisconsin Department of Natural Resources
- Website: Official website
- Wisconsin State Parks

Chippewa Moraine State Recreation Area is a state park unit of Wisconsin, United States, preserving numerous glacial landforms. The abundance and quality of these geological features led to its being included in the Ice Age National Scientific Reserve. The Ice Age National Scenic Trail passes through the park. The park is largely undeveloped, but its modern visitor center serves to interpret the area's geological and biological features. Official documentation alternatively refers to the park as the Chippewa Moraine Ice Age Reserve or the Chippewa Moraine Ice Age National Scientific Reserve. It is located in northwestern Chippewa County.

The Chippewa Moraine Interpretive Center offers exhibits about the area's geology, natural history, and cultural history, as well as naturalist-led programs for school groups. The center is located 7 miles (11 km) east of New Auburn.
