= Menominee River State Recreation Area =

Protected area in Michigan, United States

- Location within Michigan Location within the United States
- Location: Upper Peninsula, Dickinson and Menominee counties, Michigan, US
- Nearest city: Norway, Michigan
- Coordinates: 45°45′35″N 87°56′53″W
- Area: 2,879 acres (1,165 ha)
- Established: 2010
- Governing body: Michigan Department of Natural Resources
- Website: Official website

Menominee River State Recreation Area is a state-managed protected area located in Breitung and Norway townships in Dickinson County and Faithorn Township in Menominee County, Michigan, southeast of Iron Mountain. It is 2,354 acres (953 ha) in area and is currently undeveloped. The park comprises a 145.35-acre (58.82 ha) tract along 1.5 miles (2.4 km) of the Menominee River south of the City of Norway and the 2,208.83-acre (893.88 ha) Quiver Falls Tract along eight miles (13 km) of the river farther downstream. In 2016, an additional 525-acre (212 ha) of Escanaba State Forest land was transferred from the Forestry Division to the DNR's Parks and Recreation Division and became the Pemene Falls Unit of the park, matching a similarly named unit on the Wisconsin side of the river.

According to the Michigan Department of Natural Resources (DNR), the Piers Gorge tract includes "whitewater rapids and waterfalls, and contains some of the fastest-moving water in Michigan or Wisconsin. It is not navigable for general canoeing, but has become a popular destination for expert class kayakers seeking challenging Class IV whitewater. The parcel also contains good wildlife viewing opportunities for eagles, osprey and waterfowl, as well as public fishing access." The DNR notes the Quiver Falls parcel as containing "river frontage on both sides of the Menominee River, scenic rocky gorges with significant drops in the river and waterfalls. The area is popular with hunters and anglers, as well visitors because of the scenic sightseeing opportunities."

The lands on the Wisconsin side of the river are part of the Menominee River State Park and Recreation Area and managed by the Wisconsin Department of Natural Resources. Both parks are managed together by the departments of both states.

== History ==
The Menominee River State Recreation Area was officially created on November 10, 2011, when DNR Director Rodney Stokes authorized the purchase of 2,354 acres (953 ha) of Wisconsin Electric Power Company land along the Menominee River which forms the boundary between Michigan and Wisconsin. The total purchase price for the acreage on the Michigan side of the river was $2,534,400 and was funded from the Michigan Natural Resources Trust Fund and DNR Land Exchange Facilitation Fund.
