= Two Creeks, Wisconsin =

- Town
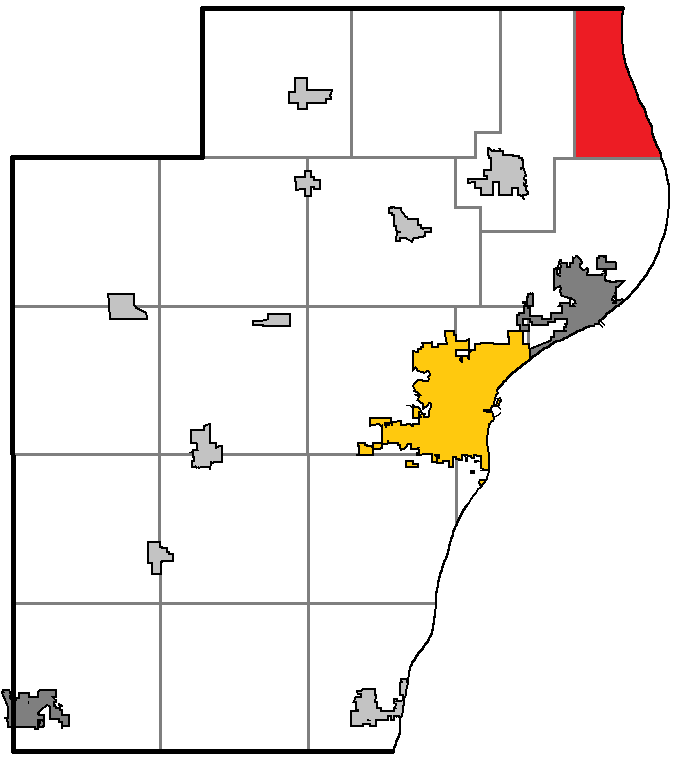
- Location of Two Creeks, within Manitowoc County
- Coordinates: 44°17′32″N 87°33′12″W
- Country: United States
- State: Wisconsin
- County: Manitowoc

Area
  - Total: 14.9 sq mi (38.5 km^{2})
  - Land: 14.9 sq mi (38.5 km^{2})
  - Water: 0 sq mi (0.0 km^{2})
- Elevation: 660 ft (200 m)

Population (2020)
  - Total: 390
  - Density: 26/sq mi (10/km^{2})
- Time zone: UTC-6 (Central (CST))
  - Summer (DST): UTC-5 (CDT)
- Area code: 920
- FIPS code: 55-81300
- GNIS feature ID: 1584305
- Website: townoftwocreeks.com

Two Creeks is a town in Manitowoc County, Wisconsin, United States. The population was 390 at the 2020 census.

== Communities ==
- Two Creeks is a defunct community located on the eastern end of Two Creeks Road. A fire from a blacksmith destroyed much of the original site in October 1918. The site is now Two Creeks County Park.
- West Two Creeks (signed by the Wisconsin Department of Transportation as "Two Creeks") is an unincorporated community at the intersection of Wisconsin Highway 42 and Two Creeks Road.

== Geography ==
According to the United States Census Bureau, the town has a total area of 14.9 square miles (38.5 km^{2}), all land.

Two Creeks is located on the shore of Lake Michigan. The Two Creeks Buried Forest State Natural Area is located north of the town.

== Demographics ==
As of the census of 2020, there were 390 people, and 148 households residing in the town. The racial makeup of the town was 96.15% White, 0.25% Native American, 0.18% Pacific Islander, 1.51% from other races. Hispanic or Latino people of any race were 2.60% of the population.

In the town, the median age is 42.5 years old with 20.8% of the population at least 65 years old.

The median income for a household in the town was $76,250, and the median income for a family was $90,000.

== Economy ==
The Point Beach Nuclear Plant is located in the town.

== History ==
The town celebrated its sesquicentennial on August 15, 2009.

In 2021, the Wisconsin Shipwreck Coast National Marine Sanctuary was established in the waters of Lake Michigan off Two Creeks.
