= Amnicon River =

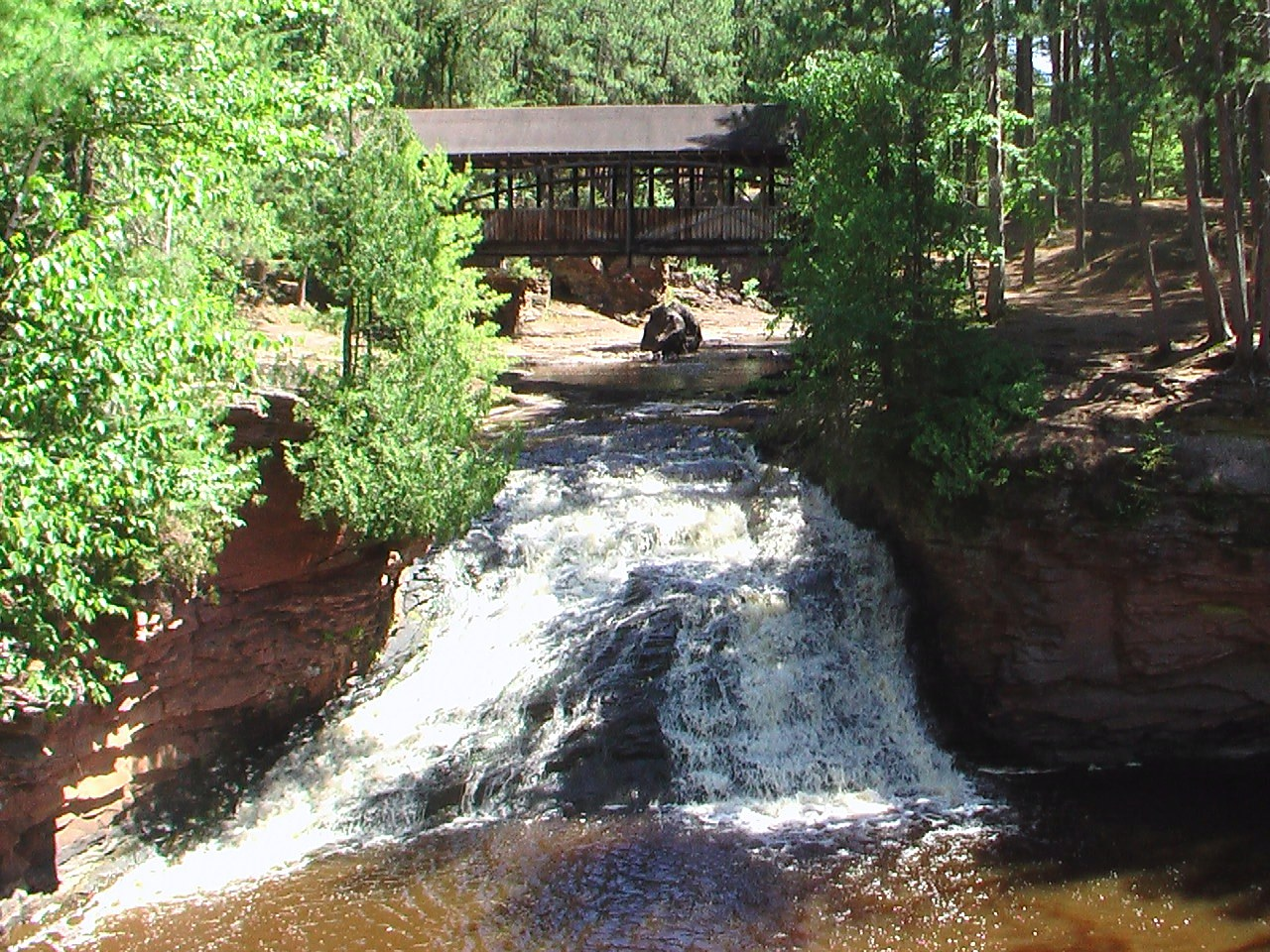
- Lower Falls in Amnicon Falls State Park

Location
- Country: United States
- Location: Douglas County, Wisconsin

Physical characteristics
- Source
  - location: East of Dowling Lake
  - coordinates: 46.473957°N 92.03194°W
  - elevation: 600 ft (180 m)
- Mouth
  - location: Lake Superior
  - coordinates: 46.691884°N 91.858243°W
- Length: 45.5 mi (73.2 km)

Basin features
- GNIS ID: 1560841

The Amnicon River is a 45.5-mile (73.2 km) river in Douglas County, Wisconsin. The river's source is east of Dowling Lake and Amnicon Lake in central Douglas County, and its mouth is at Lake Superior east of Superior.

Amnicon Falls State Park includes two major waterfalls along the river. The two waterfalls highlight the Douglas Fault, which separates basalt and sandstone formations in the area. The Upper Falls flow over basalt, while the Lower Falls flow over sandstone.

In the nineteenth century, loggers used the river to transport logs to Lake Superior. These logging operations provided building materials for Superior and Duluth, both new towns at the time.
