= Big Manitou Falls =

Waterfall and protected area in Wisconsin, US

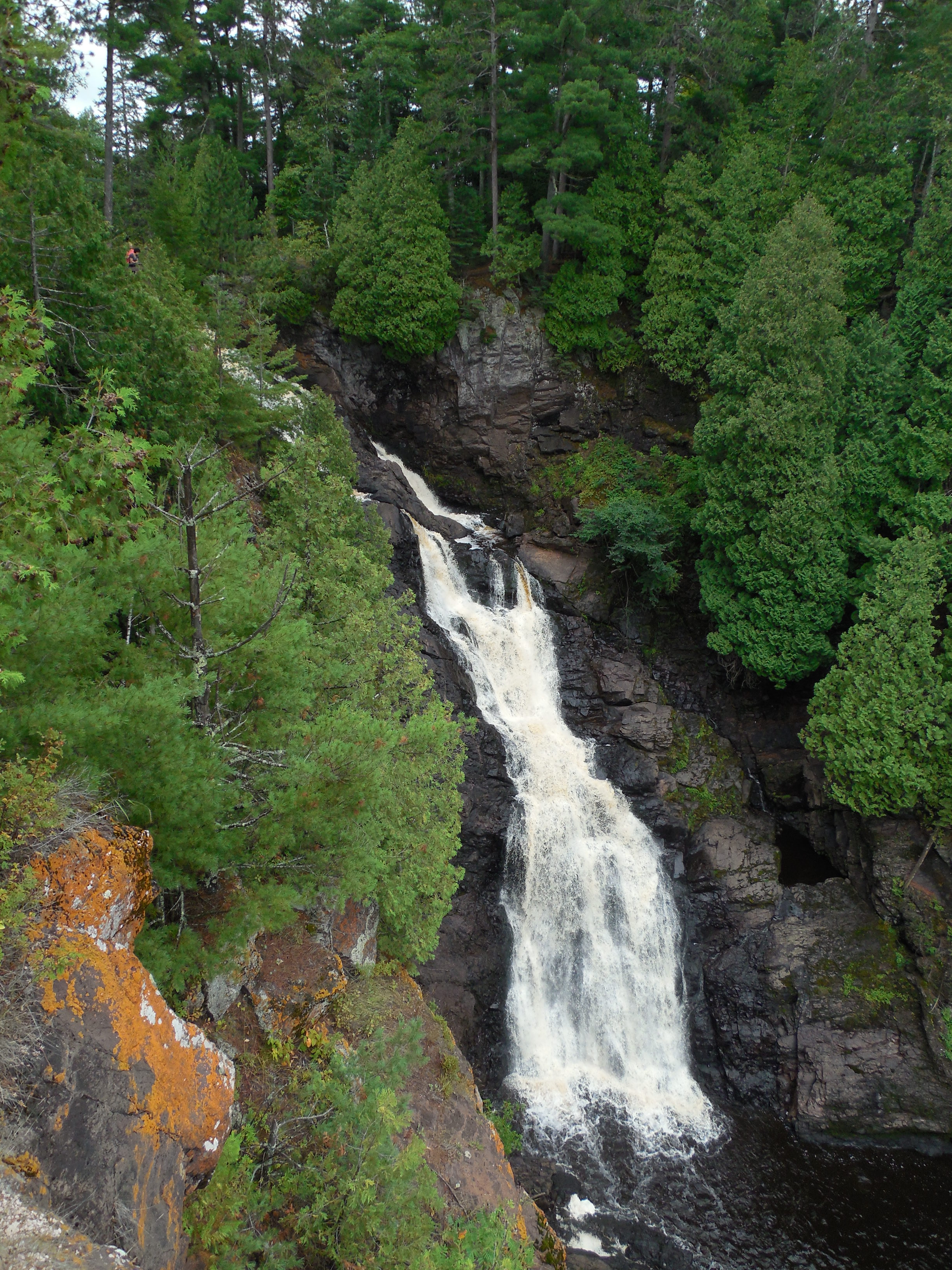
- Big Manitou Falls
- Interactive map of Big Manitou Falls
- Location: Douglas County, Wisconsin, United States
- Coordinates: 46.5360520°N 92.1213038°W
- Elevation: 958 ft (292 m)
- Total height: 165 ft (50 m)
- Watercourse: Black River

Big Manitou Falls is a waterfall on the Black River, a tributary of the Nemadji River. The falls are within Pattison State Park in Douglas County, Wisconsin, about 13 miles (21 km) south of Superior. At 165 feet (50 m), Big Manitou Falls is the highest waterfall in Wisconsin. Native Americans who settled nearby believed they heard the voice of the Great Spirit within the roaring of the falls and gave it the name "Gitchee Manitou". In 1920, a state park was created around the falls, and it received a further level of protection in 2003 upon being named a unit of the Wisconsin State Natural Areas Program.

== See also ==
- List of waterfalls
