= Stonefield (Wisconsin) =

Historic house in Wisconsin, United States

- U.S. National Register of Historic Places
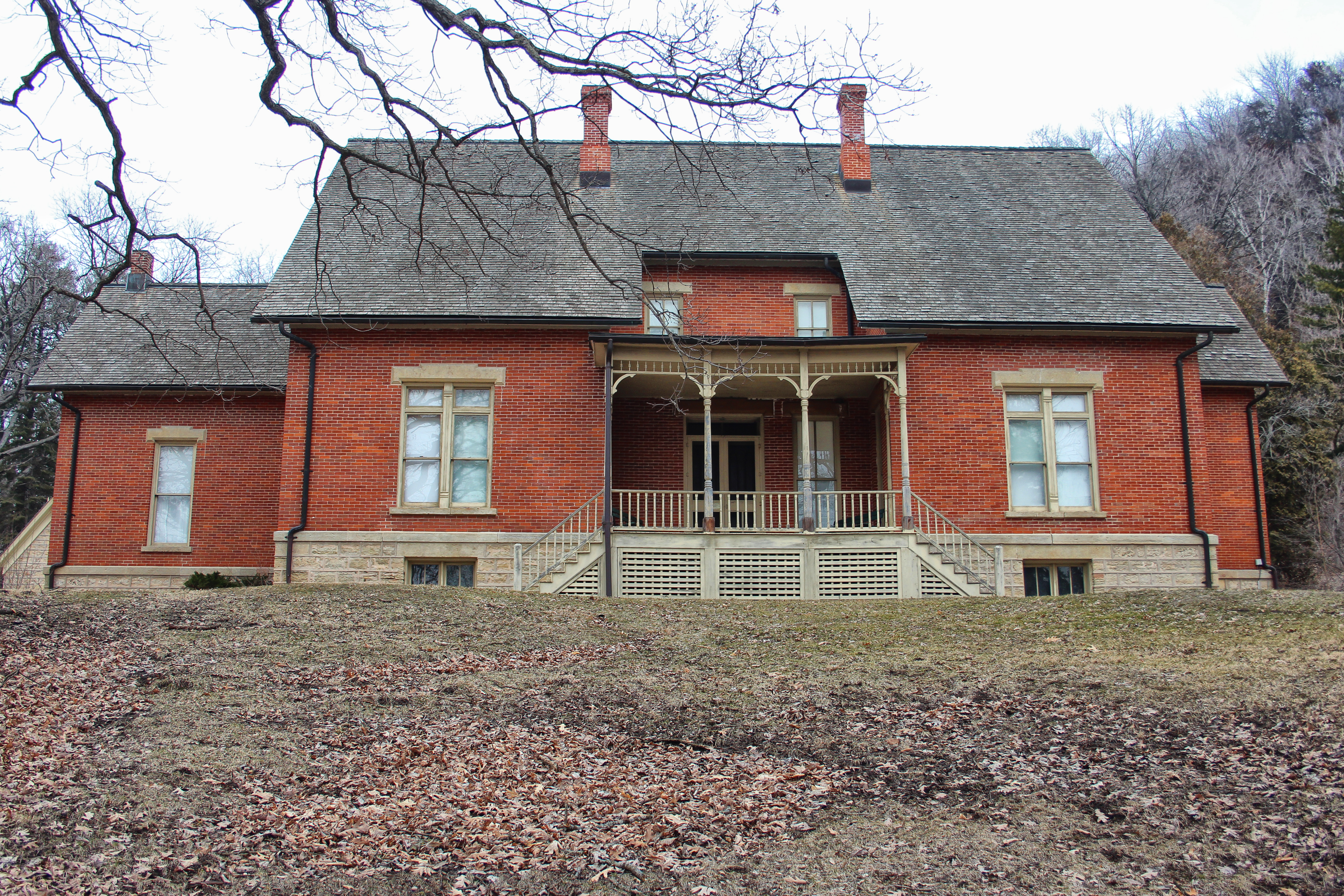

- Location within Wisconsin Location within the United States
- Location: 12195 County Road VV, Cassville, Wisconsin
- Coordinates: 42°44′3″N 91°1′18″W
- Area: 591 acres (239 ha)
- Built: 1865
- Architectural style: Gothic
- NRHP reference No.: 70000034
- Added to NRHP: May 19, 1970

Stonefield, located at 12195 County Road VV outside Cassville, Wisconsin, United States, was the 2,000-acre (800-hectare) estate of Wisconsin's first governor, Nelson Dewey. Much of the original estate has been separated into Nelson Dewey State Park and the Stonefield historic site, an expansive museum operated by the Wisconsin Historical Society. The historic site takes advantage of the large property by offering several different areas for visitors, including an early Wisconsin farmhouse, a re-created agricultural village built to resemble those common around 1900, and a reconstruction of Nelson Dewey's home. Stonefield is also home to the Wisconsin State Agricultural Museum, which features a large collection of antique farm equipment.

On May 19, 1970, Stonefield, also known as the Nelson Dewey Plantation, was added to the National Register of Historic Places.

== Governor Dewey's estate ==
Nelson Dewey first moved to Cassville from New York state in 1836. He quickly became involved in Wisconsin's territorial politics, and after Wisconsin became a state in 1848 he was elected as the first governor. He served for two terms, and afterwards he returned to Cassville. Hoping to spur development in the village, he invested in land and businesses in the area. He also went to work building an agricultural estate, which he called "Stonefield." As its centerpiece he constructed a three-story brick house in the Gothic Revival style. The home was completed in 1868. Dewey was unable to enjoy the estate for long, for in 1873 a fire destroyed the house, and shortly afterward the Panic of 1873 caused Dewey to lose nearly all of his property. He was forced to leave the estate and return to the village of Cassville, where he lived in poverty until dying in 1889.

In 1879, General Walter Cass Newberry purchased a 40-acre (16 ha) plot of land on the former estate that included the site once occupied by Dewey's home. Newberry farmed the land for several years, and in the 1890s he decided to rebuild the Dewey home as a summer residence. Although the rebuilt home followed the original floor plan used for Dewey's house, the new version did not include many of the ornate details of the Gothic revival style. Newberry sold the home in 1896, and it underwent a succession of owners before it was purchased by the state of Wisconsin during the formation of Nelson Dewey State Park.

== Stonefield Historic Site ==
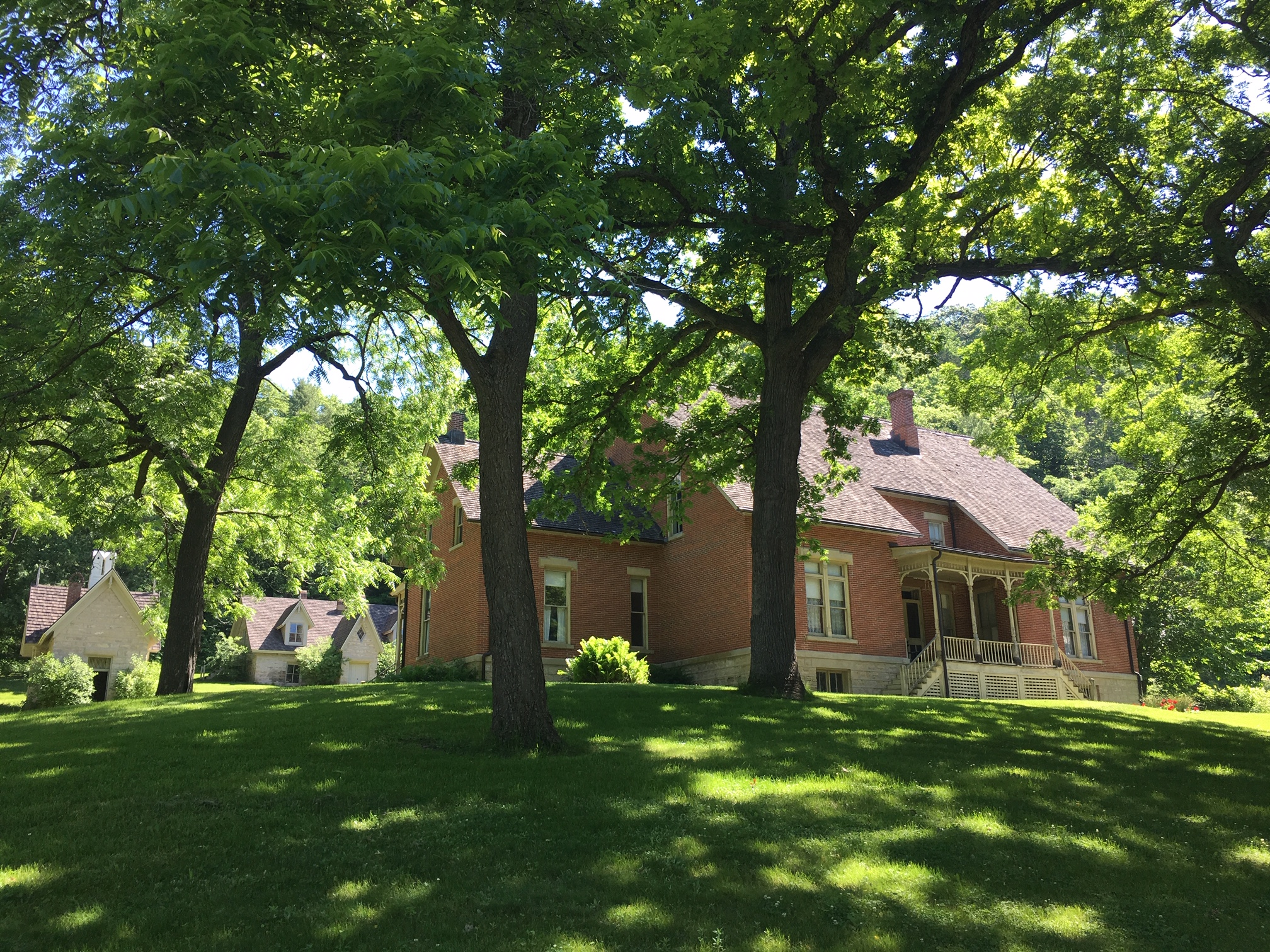
Nelson Dewey Home

In 1953, the reconstructed Dewey household was set aside from the state park for use as a museum operated by the Wisconsin Historical Society. Originally the "State Farm and Crafts Museum", the interior of the rebuilt Dewey home would later be furnished as Dewey's original house and serve as a house museum interpreting Dewey's life. In 1969, the State Agricultural Museum was added to the features at the historic site.

=== Stonefield Village ===
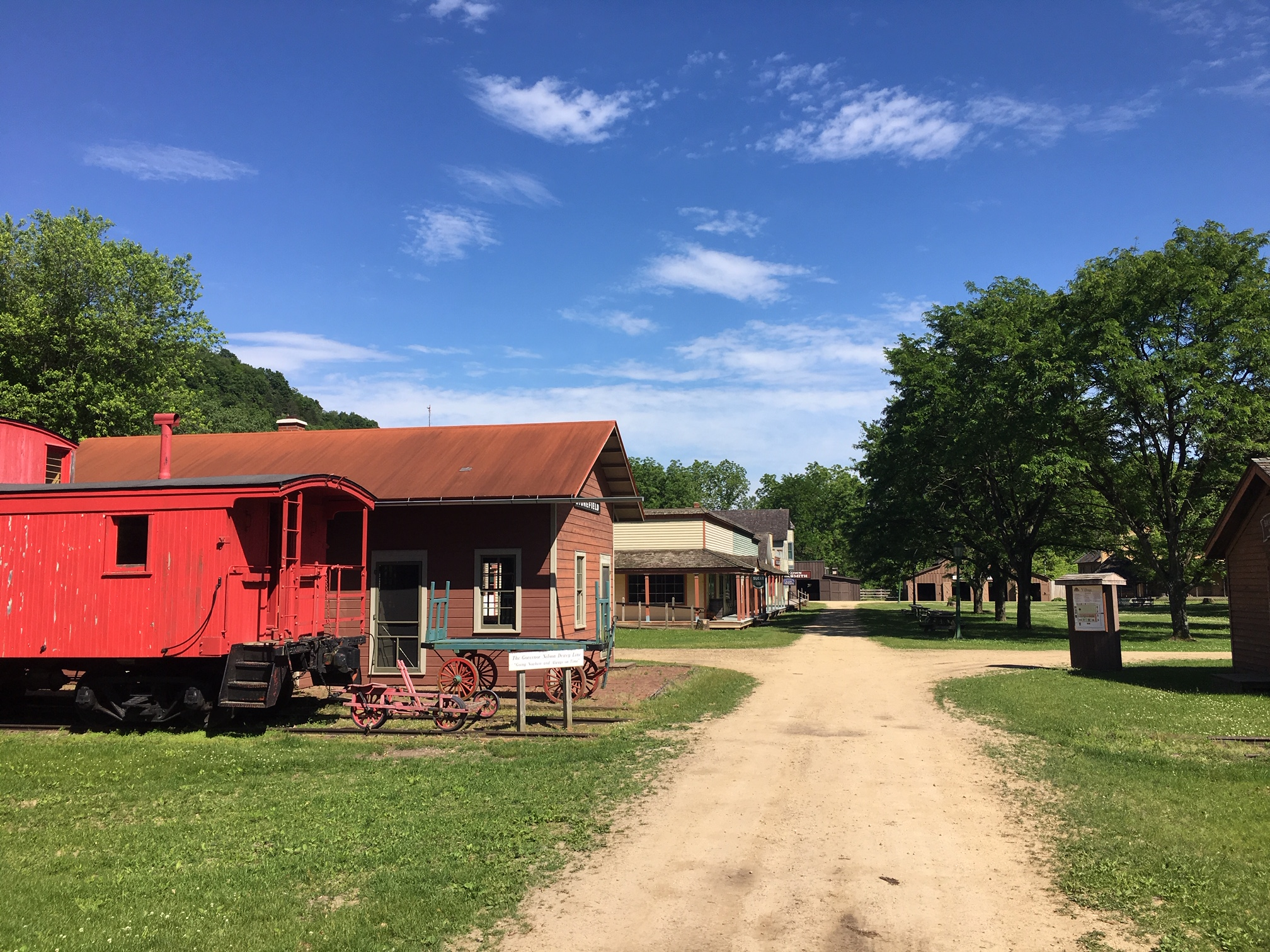
Stonefield Village

In 1954, the historical society began plans to accompany the Dewey house with a replica of the sort of rural farming village and farmstead that would have been typical in Wisconsin in around 1900. Work continued on these projects into the 1970s as buildings and objects were added to the site. Today the Stonefield village includes over thirty buildings, including a blacksmith shop, general store, schoolhouse, and other stores and social institutions. Some of these buildings are authentic historic structures that were relocated to Stonefield for use in the village. The remainder were built as replicas. Near the village, the Stonefield farmhouse offers visitors a glimpse into the lives of Wisconsin farm families during the early 20th century. Many of the buildings in the village and farmstead are staffed by costumed interpreters who help guide visitors through the site.

=== Wisconsin State Agricultural Museum ===
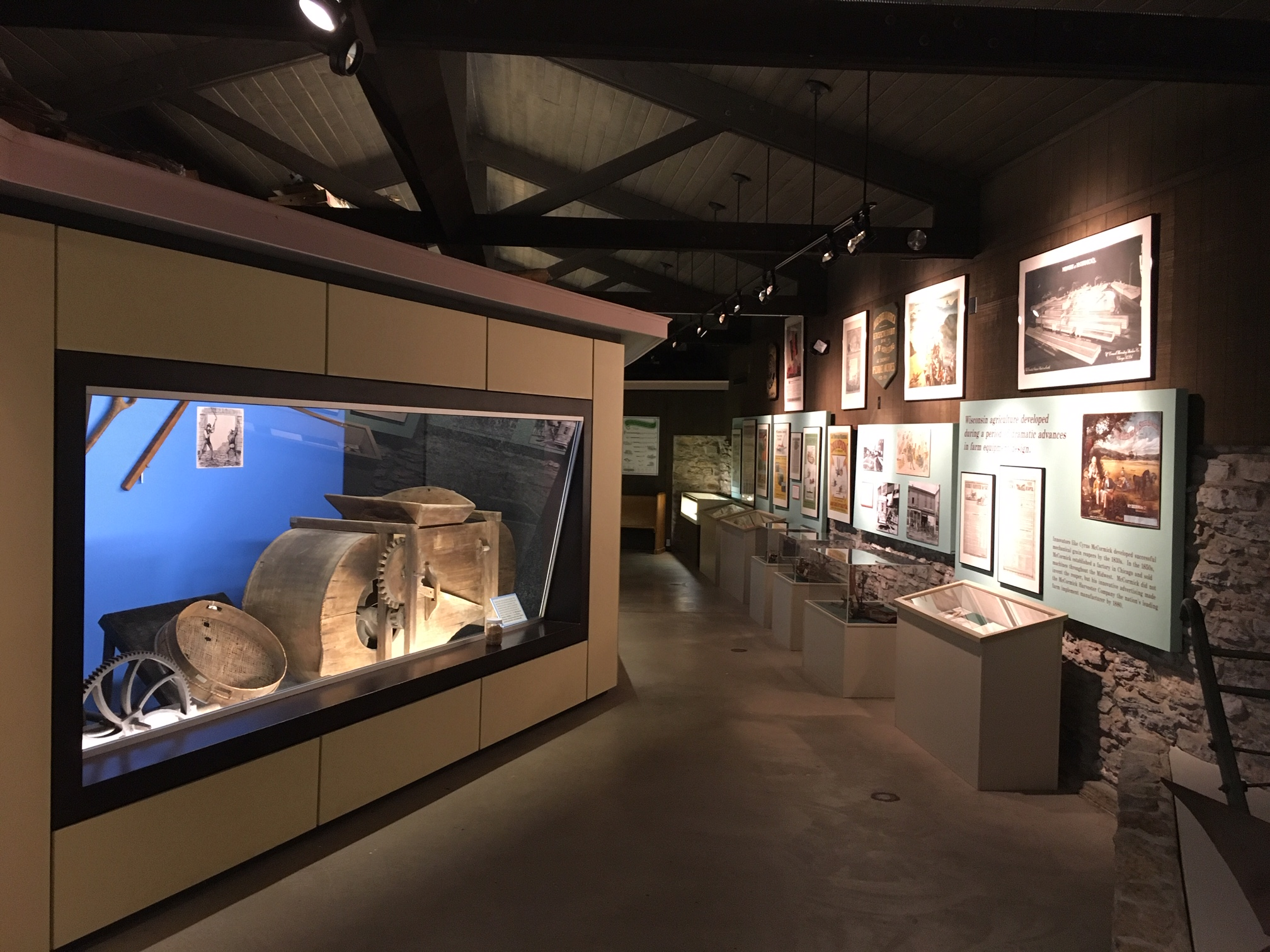
Interior of Wisconsin State Agriculture Museum

In 1969, the State Agricultural Museum was added to the features at the Stonefield historic site. The museum was built to house the large collection of historic agricultural machinery acquired by the historical society while it was creating the Stonefield village and farmstead. Inside are exhibits detailing the history of Wisconsin agriculture from the time when it was practiced by Native Americans through the early 20th century. The museum also tells of Wisconsin's major agricultural equipment manufacturers, the Case Corporation and Allis-Chalmers, and features many rare and valuable pieces of antique farm equipment.

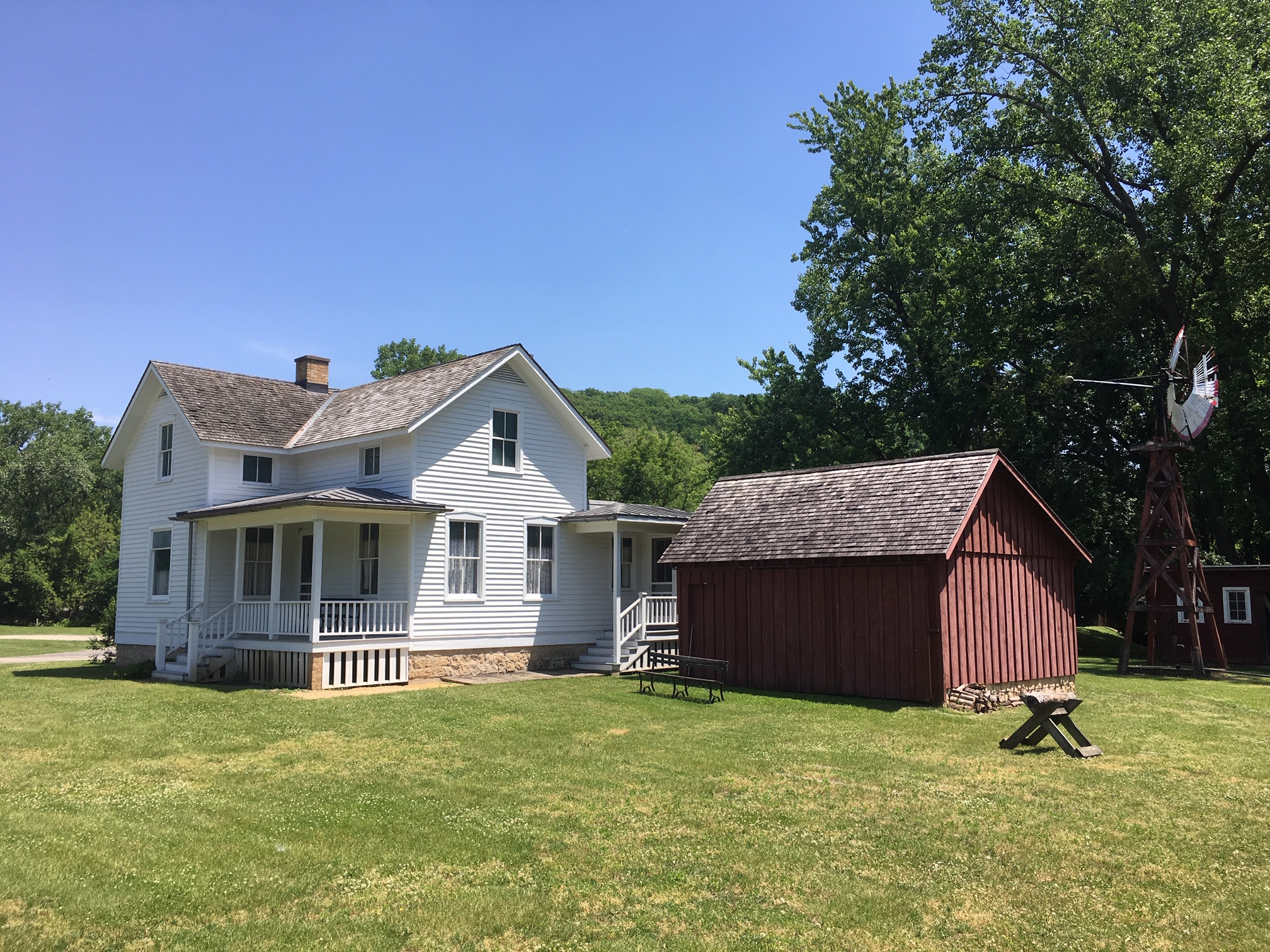
Recreated Progressive Farm at Stonefield Historic Site
