= Civil defense siren =

Device used to warn public of danger

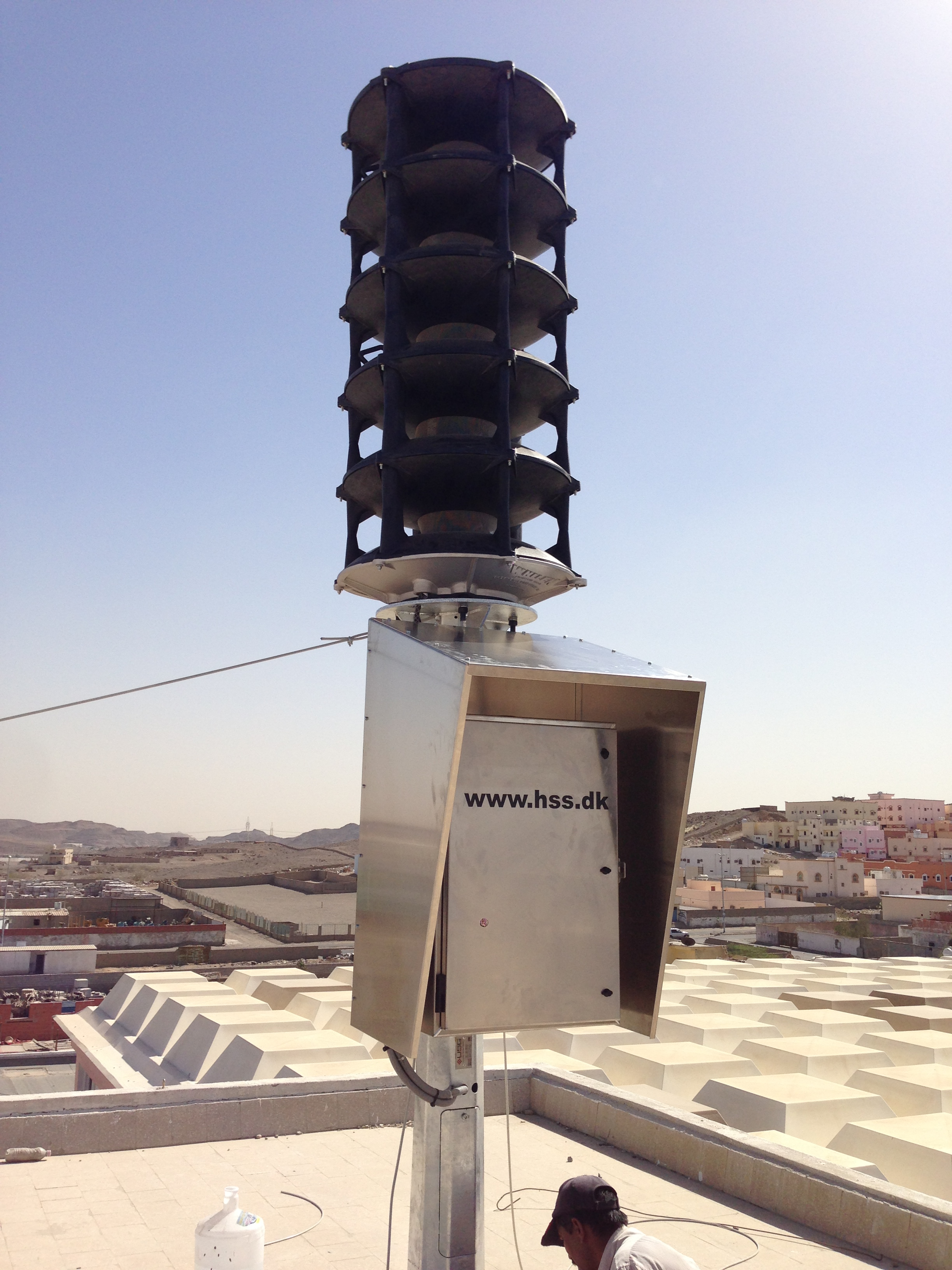
An HSS TWS 295 Siren (license-built Whelen WPS-2905) in Saudi Arabia

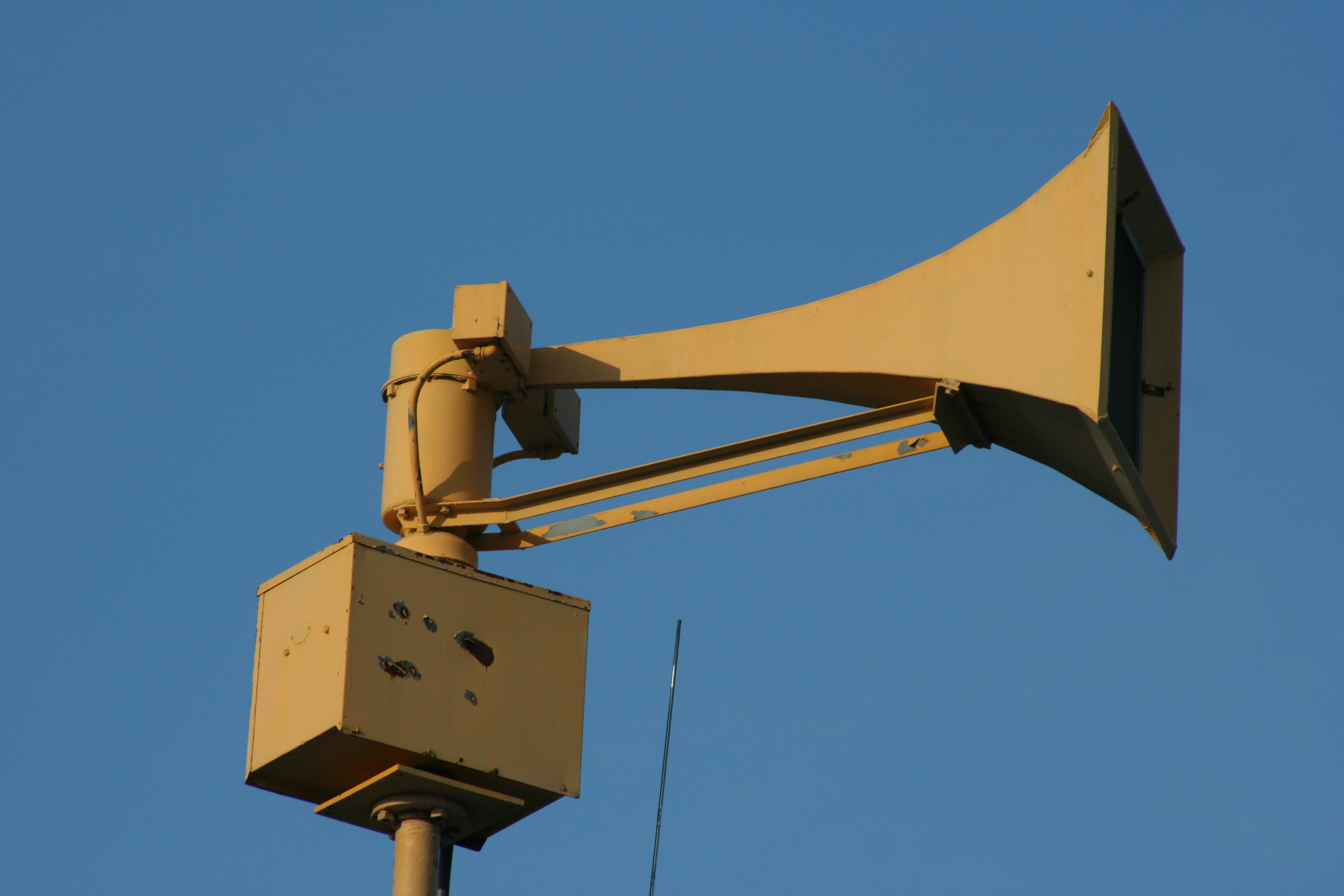
Federal Signal Thunderbolt 1003 in Louisville, KY

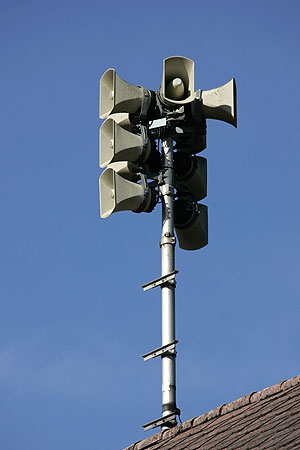
There are 8,200 alarm sirens for civil protection throughout Switzerland. They are tested once a year on the first Wednesday in February. Sound sample

A civil defense siren (also commonly known as an air-raid or tornado siren) is a form of siren used to warn civilians of approaching danger – a form of emergency population warning. Initially designed to warn city dwellers of air raids (air-raid sirens) during World War II, they were later used to warn of nuclear attack and natural disasters, such as tornadoes (tornado sirens). The generalized nature of sirens led to many of them being replaced with more specific warnings, such as the broadcast-based Emergency Alert System and the Cell Broadcast-based Wireless Emergency Alerts and EU-Alert mobile technologies.

By use of varying tones or binary patterns of sound, different alert conditions can be called. Electronic sirens can transmit voice announcements in addition to alert tone signals. Siren systems may be electronically controlled and integrated into other warning systems.

== Integrated public warning systems ==
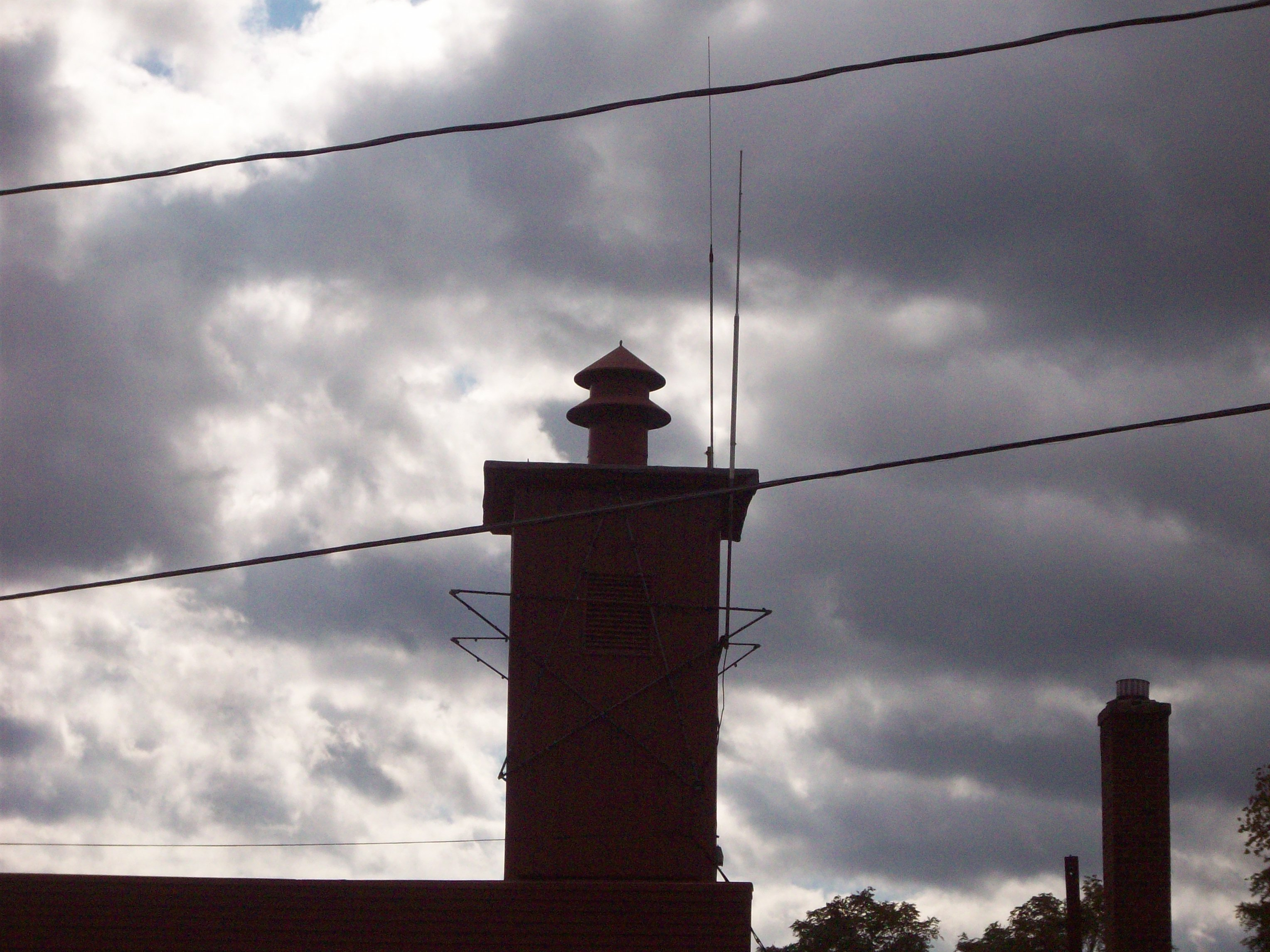
Federal Signal Model 5 in Ballston Spa, NY

Sirens are sometimes integrated into a warning system that links sirens with other warning media, such as the radio and TV Emergency Alert System, NOAA Weather Radio, telephone alerting systems, Reverse 911, Cable Override, and wireless alerting systems in the United States and the National Public Alerting System, Alert Ready, in Canada. This fluid approach enhances the credibility of warnings and reduces the risk of assumed false alarms by corroborating warning messages through multiple forms of media. The Common Alerting Protocol is a technical standard for this sort of multi-system integration.

Siren installations have many ways of being activated. Commonly used methods are dual-tone multi-frequency signaling (DTMF), Frequency Shift Keying (FSK), Two Tone Activation, EAS (using radio activation) or public switched telephone network (PSTN) using telephone lines. This method opens up vulnerability for exploitation, but there are protections from false alarms. These sirens can also be tied into other networks such as a fire department's volunteer notification/paging system. The basics of this type of installation would consist of a device (possibly the same pager the firefighters have) connected to the controller/timer system of the siren. When a page is received, the siren is activated.

== Types ==
=== Electromechanical ===
==== Basic design ====
An ACA Allertor 125 in Alert and Attack modes (video)

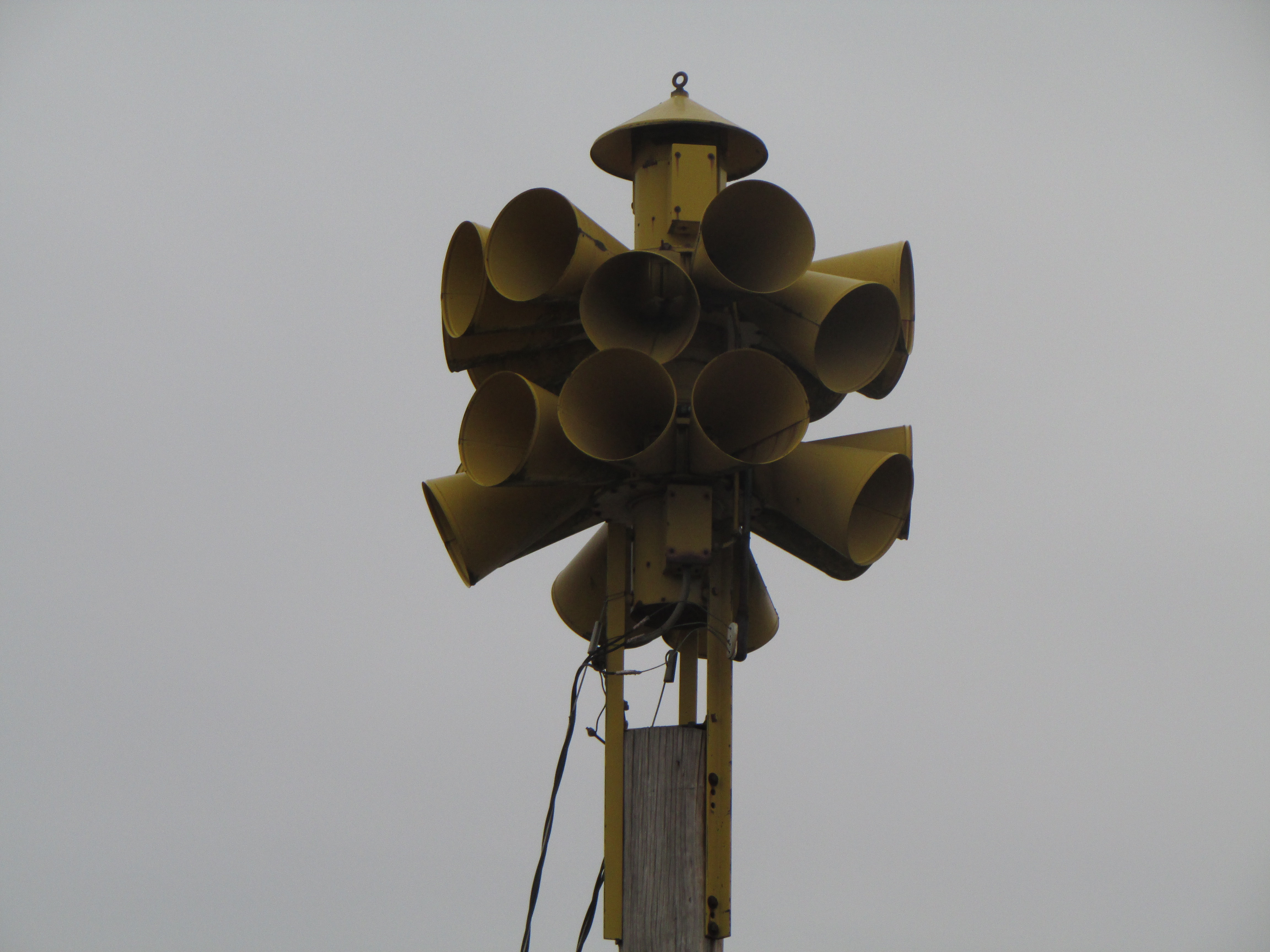
An older and damaged 3T22 at a fire station in Sandy, Oregon, that has now been restored and hung from the ceiling of the entrance lobby

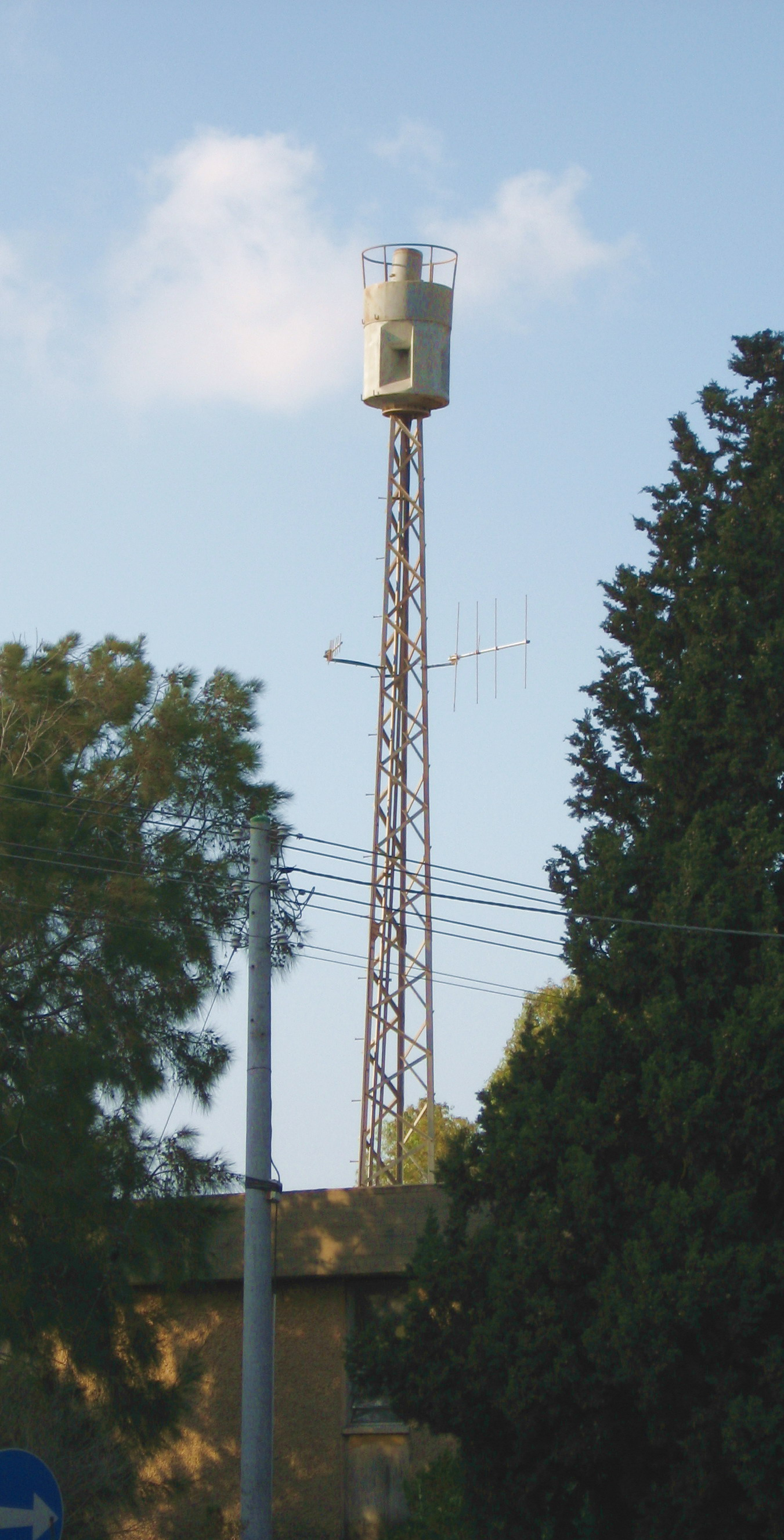
A Hormann HLS F-71 Pneumatic air-raid siren in Haifa, Israel. Sirens of this type are common in Israeli towns and cities, and until 2012 were used to warn against air raids and missile attacks.

A mechanical siren uses a rotor (sometimes called chopper or impeller) and stator to chop an air stream, which is forced through the siren by radial vanes in the spinning rotor. An example of this type of siren is the Federal Signal 2T22, which was originally developed during the Cold War and produced from the early 1950s to the late 1980s. This particular design employs dual rotors and stators to sound each pitch. Because the sound power output of this type of siren is the same in every direction at all times, it is described as omnidirectional. The Federal Signal 2T22 was also marketed in a three-signal configuration known as the Federal Signal 3T22, with the capability for a high–low signal.

While some mechanical sirens produce sound in all directions simultaneously, other designs produce sound in only one direction, while employing a rotator mechanism to turn the siren head through 360 degrees of rotation. One rare type of mechanical siren, the Federal Signal RSH-10 ("Thunderbeam"), does not rotate or produce equal sound output in all directions. It instead uses a slowly rotating angled disc below the siren which directs the siren's output throughout 360 degrees.

==== Supercharged ====
A variation of the electromechanical siren is a supercharged siren. A supercharged siren uses a separate source, usually a supercharger-like blower, which forces air into the rotor assembly of the siren. This increases the air pressure in the rotor assembly, causing the sound output of the siren to increase heavily, which in return increases the sound range by a large amount. The blower is generally driven by an electric motor, but in rare cases it is driven by an engine. Federal Signal took advantage of this design and created their Thunderbolt Siren Series, utilizing Sutorbilt Roots Blowers of different varieties and outputs. Within the Thunderbolt product line, three different configurations were offered: the Thunderbolt 1000, a single-tone siren; the Thunderbolt 1000T, a dual-tone siren; and the Thunderbolt 1003, a variation of the 1000T that employs solenoid-actuated slide valves to create a "hi-lo" (High-Low) signal primarily used as a fire signal.

A very early model of the Thunderbolt 2000 was offered in both single tone and dual tone. The difference between the Thunderbolt 2000 and later editions is that its blower is driven by an Onan two cylinder gas engine. Another example of a siren that has a separate blower is the Alerting Communicators of America (ACA) Hurricane. One more example of a siren with a blower is the SoCal Edison Model 120, utilizing a Centrifugal Style Blower, built specifically for the San Onofre Nuclear Generating Station. The SoCal Edison Model 120 is no longer standing out in public, as only one exists, and is owned privately.

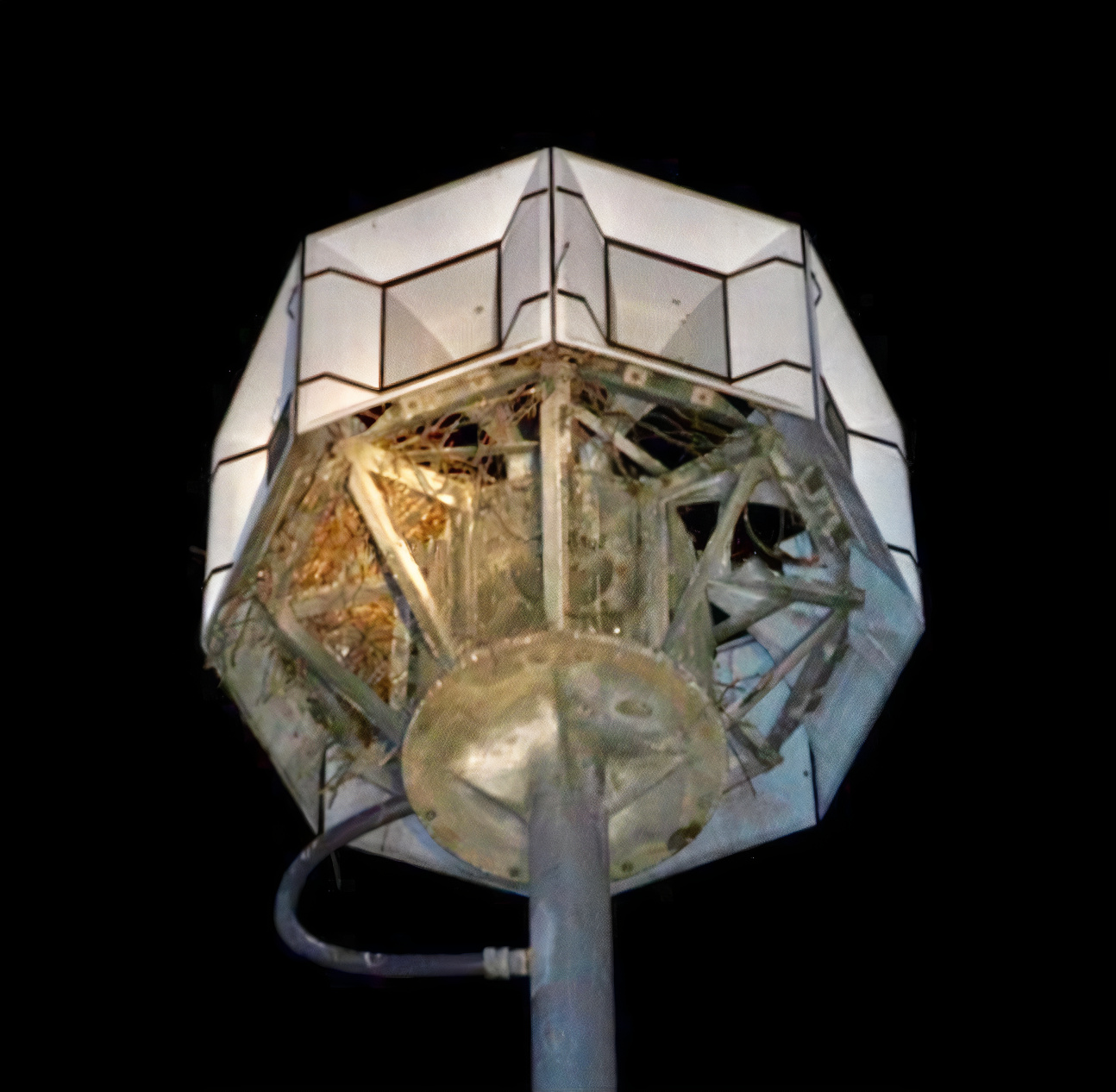
A SoCal Edison Model 120 illuminated by a spotlight in the night sky in 2003. They were manufactured in-house by SoCal Edison and were installed in 1982 for use with the San Onofre Nuclear Generating Station Community Alert Siren System. The blower is located in the middle just above the mounting plate hidden within the mesh bird screen between the frame support structure for the horns.

==== Pneumatic ====
Another variation on the electromechanical siren is the pneumatic siren. Similar to supercharged sirens, pneumatic sirens also force air into the rotor assembly of the siren. However, these sirens use a pressurized air reservoir instead of a motor-driven blower. hochleistungssirene (HLS), first produced by the German firm Pintsch-Bamag and later by the German firm Hörmann. Soon afterward, Hörmann improved on the design to create the HLS 273, which did away with the massive siren head of the original in favor of a more compact head and cast aluminum exponential-profile horns. These sirens stored a reservoir of compressed air, recharged periodically by a diesel engine-driven compressor in a vault in the base of the massive siren unit. The later HLS 273 placed the large (6,000 liter) air tank underground beside the machinery vault, instead of in the mast itself as in the earlier HLS units.

=== Electronic ===
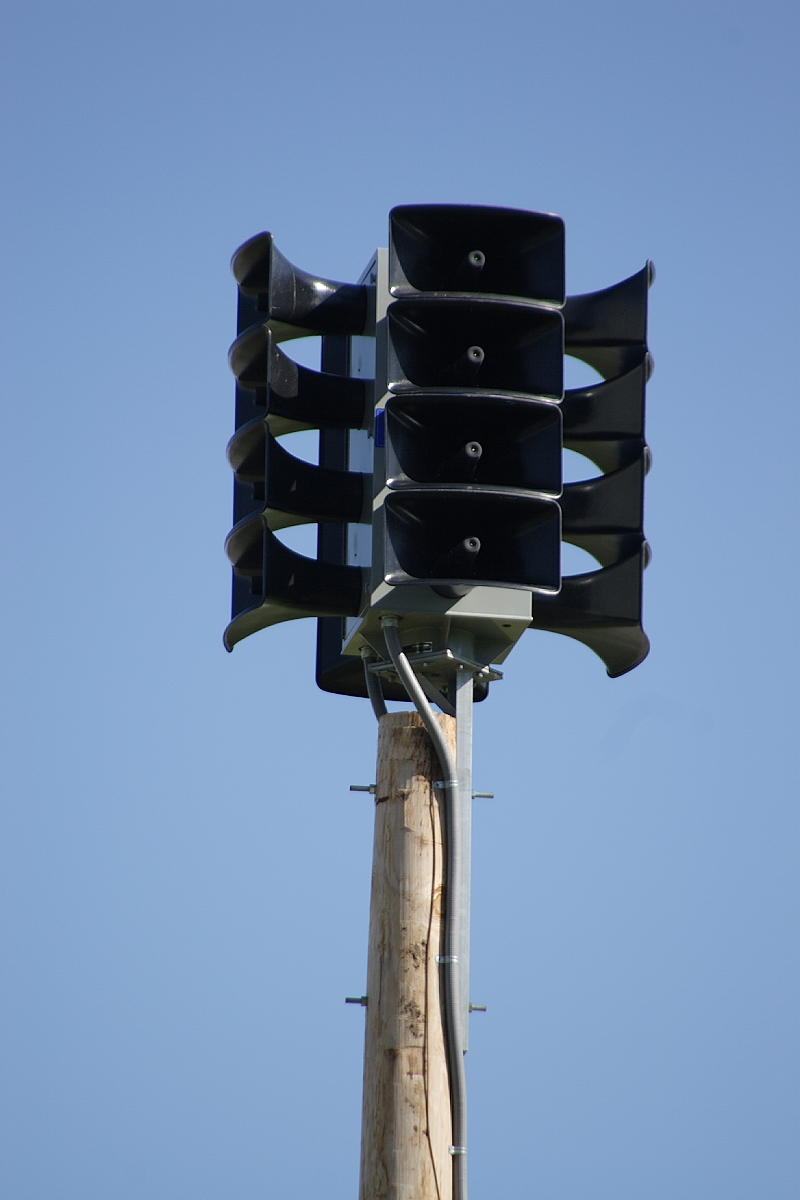
American Signal AL-8000 in O'Fallon, IL

Electronic sirens consist of an electronic tone generator, a high-power amplifier, and a horn loudspeaker. Typically, the loudspeaker unit incorporates horn loading, causing them to be similar in appearance to some electromechanical sirens. Many of these loudspeakers incorporate a vertical array of horns to achieve pattern control in the vertical plane. Each cell of the loudspeaker horn is driven by one or more compression drivers. One type of compression driver for this type of loudspeaker uses two doughnut-shaped permanent magnet slugs to provide magnetic flux. For siren applications, high-fidelity sound is a secondary concern to high output, and siren drivers typically produce large amounts of distortion which would not be tolerable in an audio system where fidelity is important. Most newer (and some older) electronic sirens have the ability to store digital audio files. These audio files could be custom sounds, or emergency messages. Depending on the situation, the stored sound file can broadcast through the siren. These sirens could also come with a Microphone Jack to broadcast live messages via microphone.

As with electromechanical sirens, there are both omnidirectional, directional, and rotating categories. Whelen Engineering produces sirens which oscillate through 360 degrees, rotating in one direction and then in the other to allow a hard-wired connection between the amplifiers and the siren drivers. These sirens can also be set to rotate any amount from 0 to 360 degrees, allowing sirens to broadcast only in certain directions.

Electronic sirens may be mechanically rotated to cover a wide area, or may have transducers facing in all directions to make an omnidirectional pattern. A directional siren may be applied where notification is only required for a defined area in one direction.

== Around the world ==
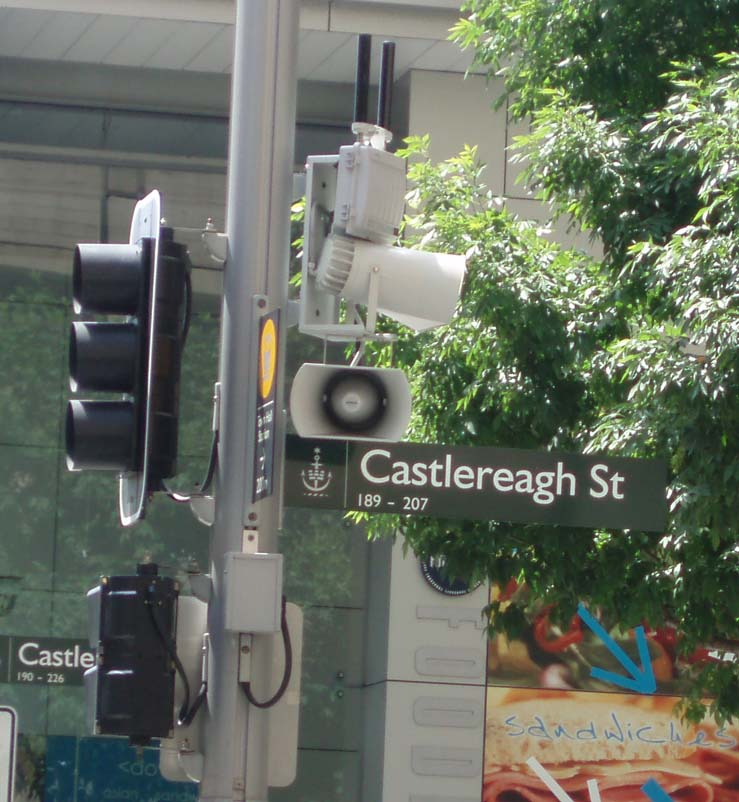
One of the various outdoor public address systems to warn the public of terrorism, installed at various locations around Sydney's Central Business District

=== Middle East ===
==== Iran, Kuwait, and Iraq ====
Kuwait has an entire siren system of Federal Signal Modulators. They once had an entire system of Thunderbolt system 7000's, until they were all replaced. However, one System 7000 remains on display. Iran & Iraq, since the 80's, there is now a whole system of the Pneumatic sirens made by Hörmann, specifically, the Hörmann HLS 273, and Iraq replaced them for Comtel manufactured sirens

==== Israel ====
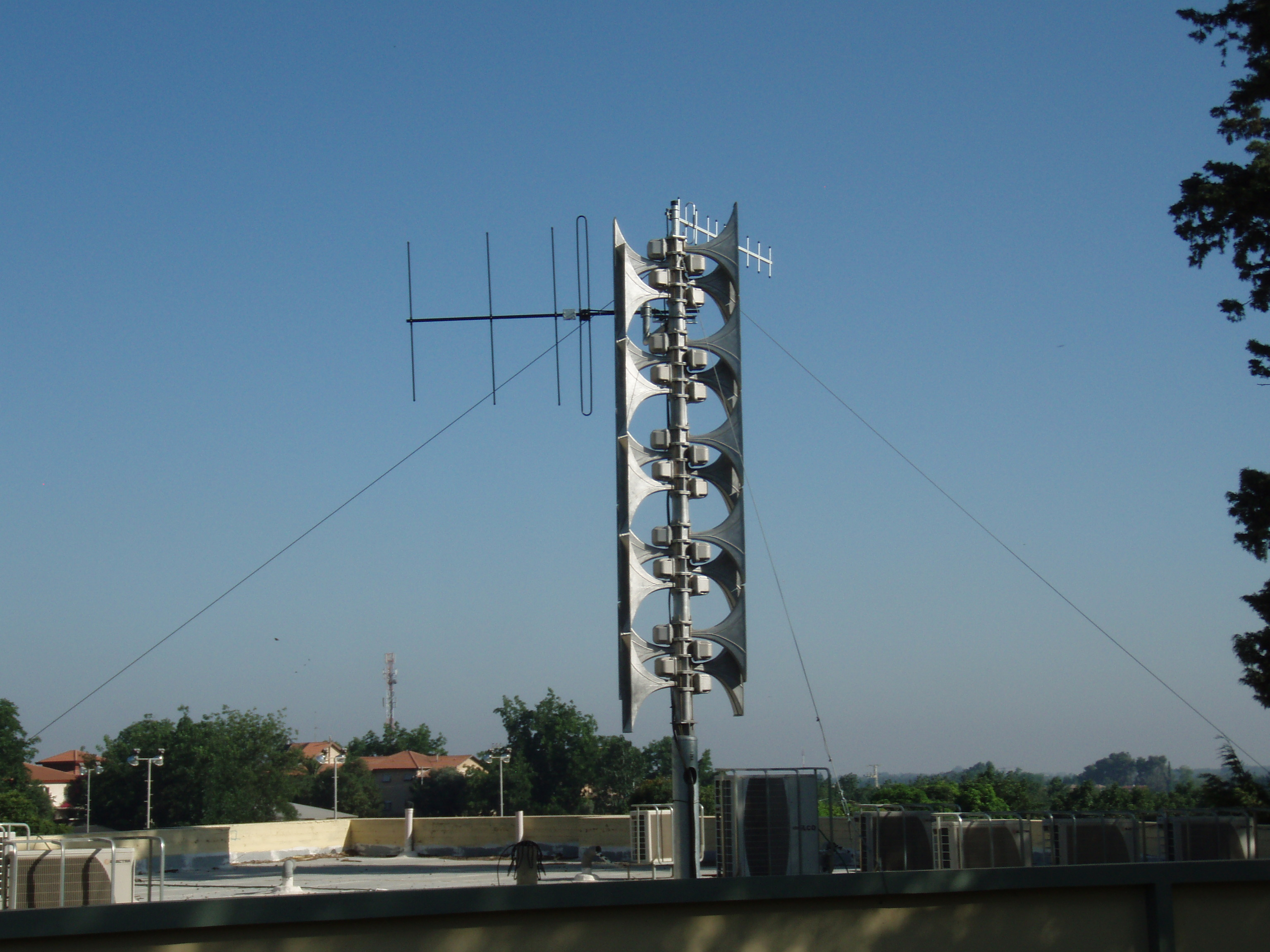
An electronic ECN3000 siren in Kfar Hess, Israel

Israel has more than 3,100 warning sirens. Most of the sirens in urban areas are German-made HLS sirens, models F71, 273 and ECN3000. All the other sirens are HPSS32 models made by Acoustic Technologies (ATI) and the Federal Signal Modulator 6048. During the early 2010s, mechanical sirens were gradually phased out and replaced by electronic ones, although the mechanical ones were generally left standing. The air-raid sirens are called אזעקה az'aka, 'alarm', and consist of a continuous ascending and descending tone. The all clear signal, called צפירת הרגעה tzfirat harga'a, is a constant single-pitch sound. In recent conflicts, use of the all clear signal has been discontinued, as it was seen as causing unnecessary confusion and alarm. In certain regions in the south of Israel, which regularly undergo rocket attacks from Gaza, a specialized system called Red Color is used.

There is an earthquake warning system in Israel, which uses the sirens, called Trua (תרועה).

Siren in Israel, during missile attack, October 2024

The all clear signal is used three times per year to denote a moment of silence (of one or two minutes): once on Israel's Holocaust Remembrance Day and twice on the Day of Remembrance.

==== Saudi Arabia ====
Most minaret speakers are used as sirens. The purpose of warnings is to notify the population of a danger that threatens their lives. Individuals must go to shelters or their homes, lock doors and windows, take appropriate protective actions, and listen through the radio and television for instructions of civil defense. During the Gulf War in 1991, Saudi Arabia had a whole system of the Hörmann electronic siren ECL-400 and ACA Cyclone 120-C. The entire siren system is ASC I-Force and Whelen WPS-2900 series. As well as some Federal Signal Modulators in Air Force Bases, SelecTones, FS EOWS 1212 in Dammam, and even an ASC Alertronic RE-1600, STH-10's, 3T22'S, etc.

==== Turkey ====
Turkey has Nationwide Siren System of Mechanical Sirens and Loudspeakers, though minaret speakers also are used as sirens sometimes. Models for mechanical sirens used across country are Selay SL-1170's. Even though the main models of the warning speakers are unknown, there is a slightly common presence of Federal Signal, Whelen and Hörmann, Sonnenburg, despite very rare cases of some Elektror or Siemens-Schuckert models remaining. They sound off at 9:05 AM on November 10th every year in remembrance of Atatürk's death and also for common emergencies such as earthquakes, tsunamis, tornadoes, chemical plant issues or incoming enemy attack. Sirens are controlled by AFAD. Sirens can also be mounted on roofs, or sometimes on 30 meter tall towers.

==== United Arab Emirates ====
The United Arab Emirates uses an integrated national Early Warning System (EWS) which was developed in 2017 and utilizes a network of cell broadcast, variable-message signs on roads, radio alerts, television alerts, and loudspeakers in mosque minarets as sirens. The warning system is managed by the National Emergency Crisis and Disaster Management Authority (NCEMA) and is used to warn the public during times of an emergency or a disaster.

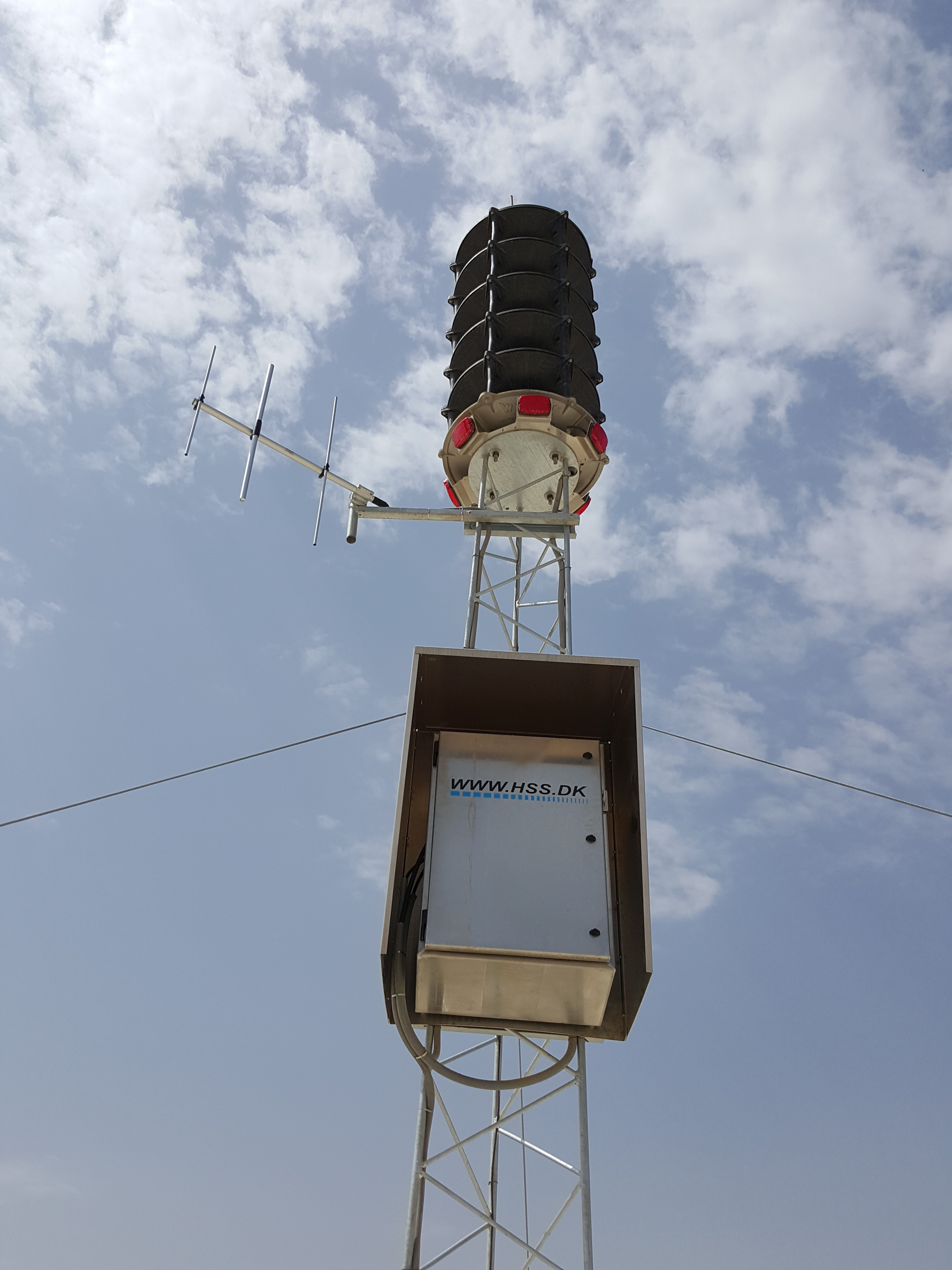
TWS-295 siren for warning system, manufactured by HSS Engineering

=== Asia ===
==== The People's Republic of China ====
China has sirens located in most cities and towns, particularly those located in or near disputed territories. If the state declares a state of emergency due to attacks or invasion, or when there is a very high risk of military conflict, sirens will warn the public of possible attacks or invasion. The sirens are controlled by the People's Liberation Army.

There are annual or semi-annual test runs, often occurring on commemorative dates that are associated with the Second Sino-Japanese War. For example, Nanjing annually tests air raid sirens at 10 a.m. on 13 December, followed by a moment of silence to commemorate the Nanking Massacre. There have also been some commemorative tests during the memorial periods of major disasters, such as on 19 May 2008 in memory of victims of the 2008 Sichuan Earthquake.

A complete set of air raid alarms

The air raid warning comes in three types:

- Pre-raid warning: a 36-second steady tone followed by a 24-second wind down, repeated three times. This warning signifies an air raid is likely about to take place.
- Raid warning: a three minute wail signal. This signifies that an air raid is imminent.
- Post-raid warning: a three minute steady signal. When sounded, it signifies an end to the raid or a cool-down of the wartime situation.

==== Taiwan ====
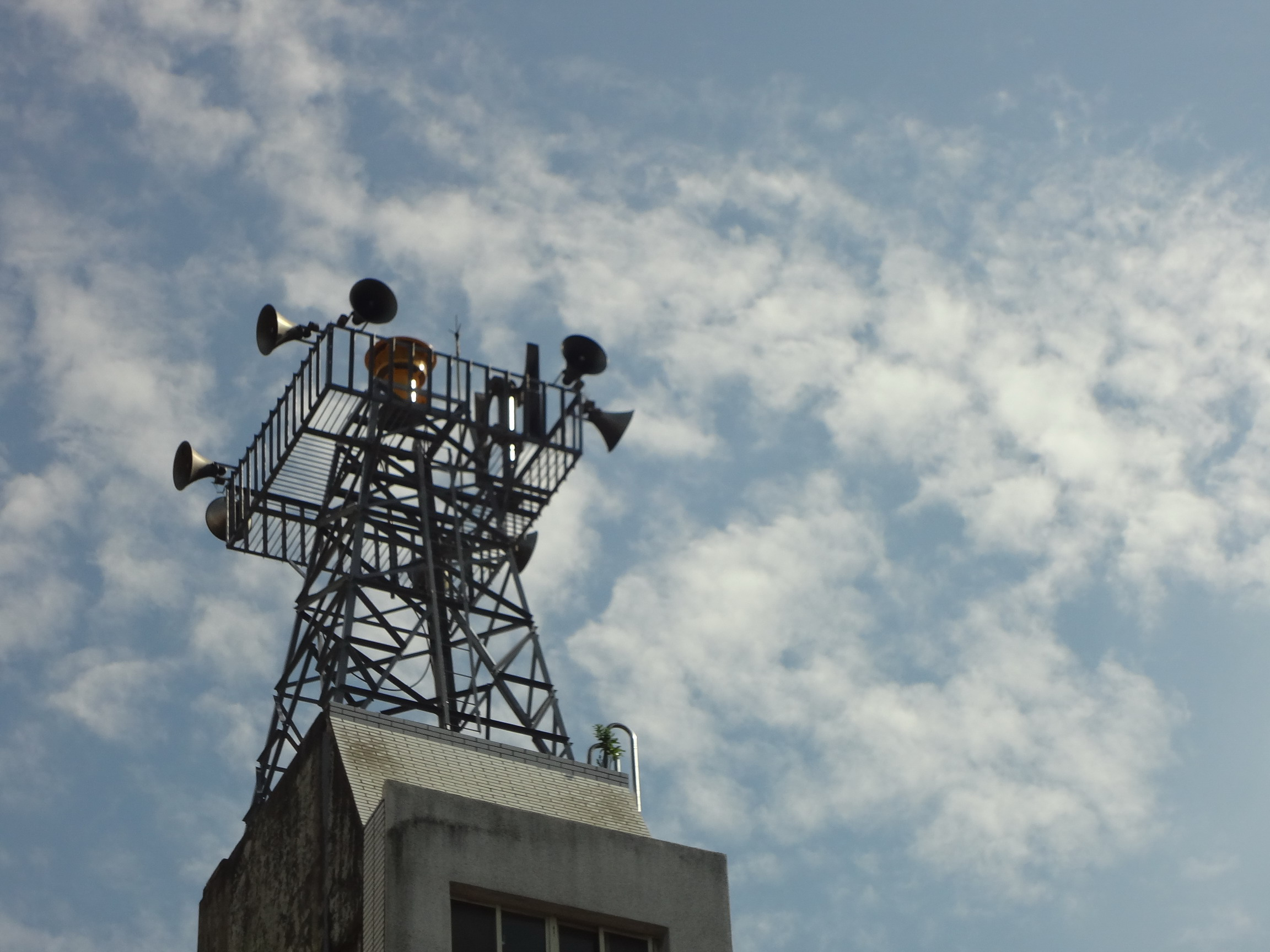
A typical siren found on police stations in Taiwan, seen with loudspeakers around it. Either the yellow mechanical siren or the surrounding electronic sirens are in service.

Taiwanese civil defense sirens are erected on police stations and commanded by the nation's Civil Defense Office (民防指揮管制所). The government issues air raid warnings, as well as tsunami warnings, through the sirens in conjunction with their own Public Warning System that utilizes 4G LTE cell signals. The Taiwanese government also holds annual air-raid drills called Wan-an drills (萬安演習) so the populace can be familiar with what to do in an air raid, given the high risk of war with neighboring mainland China.

==== India ====
Mumbai has around 200–250 functional sirens. The government is planning to change the system by incorporating modern wireless and digital technology in place of the present landline switching system.

In Mumbai, civil defence sirens were used during the Indo-Pakistan wars of 1965 and 1971, warning civilians about air raids by the Pakistan Air Force. At night, sirens were also used to indicate blackouts, when all lights in Mumbai were switched off. Daily tests of the sirens at 9 a.m. were recently reduced to once per month. They are controlled by the Regional Civil Defence Control Center, Mumbai, with input from Indian Defence Services. Sirens are also used to denote a minute's worth of silence on special occasions.

==== Japan ====
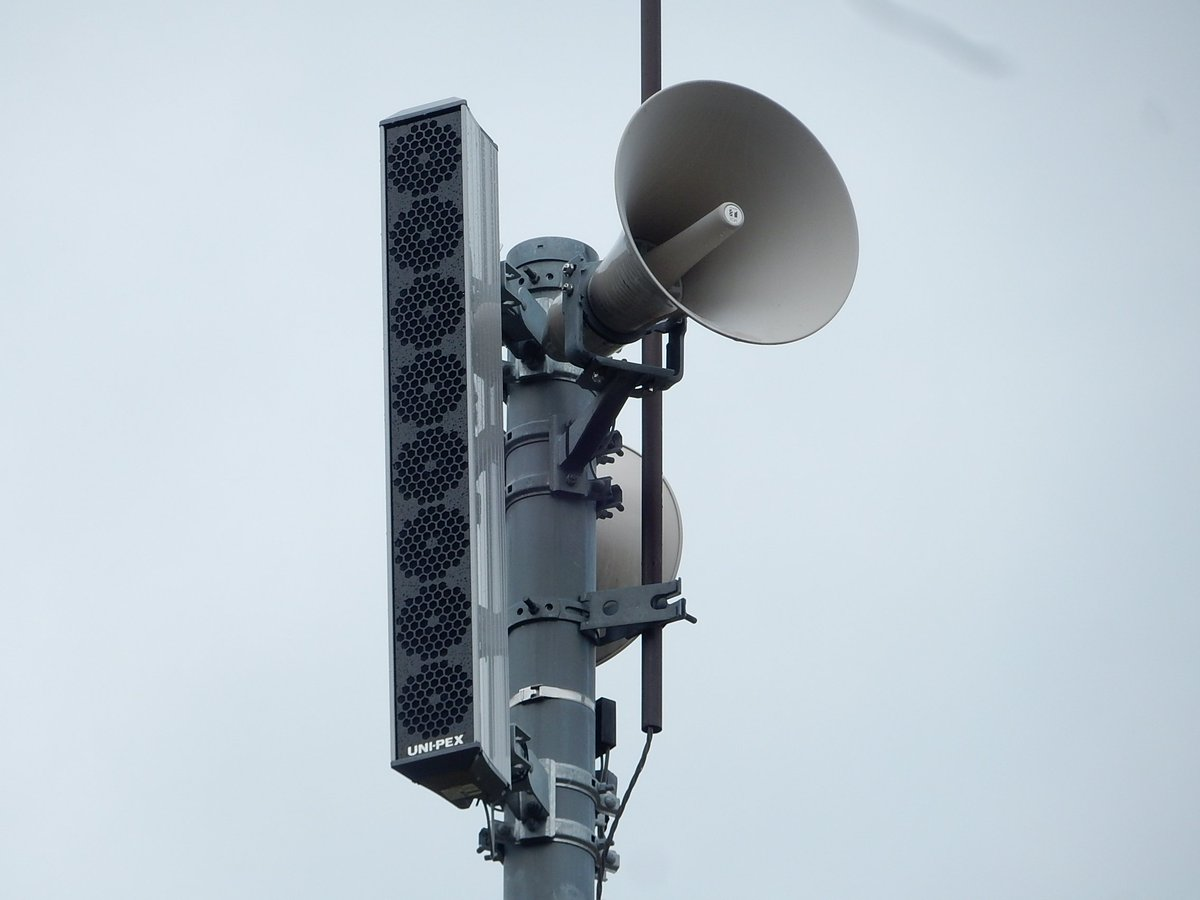
An example of a Bosai Musen electronic siren. Note the left one has an unusual design and has the UNI-PEX branding, and the right one has a reflex horn design and has the TOA logo on the front. Both are capable of playing music at certain times of day and broadcasting voice announcements.

Japan utilizes a system of mainly electronic Bosai Musen electronic sirens to warn of impending missile strikes or natural disasters such as Tsunamis. The system was installed by J-Alert in 2007 as one of their many other methods of warning the public of incoming dangers.

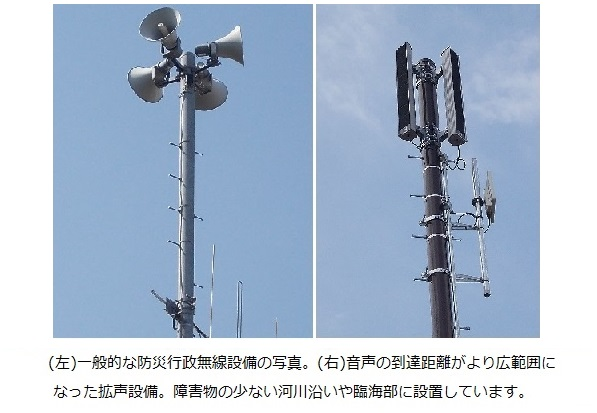
An example of the most common Bosai Musen types in Japan. Note the one on the left has a common reflex horn design, while the right one has an unusual speaker design. Both are made by TOA, a Japanese company.

Some of these sirens are also used to play music at certain times of day, presumably as an end of day signal.

In Japan, where natural disasters occur frequently, civil defense alerts play an important role. These alert systems are located in towns and cities all over the country and are connected to J-Alert, which makes it possible to send alerts to the whole country in the shortest possible time. Unlike most civil warning sirens, the Japanese government usually plays renditions of different music. These are usually played at 5:00 p.m. and play a variety of music including traditional children's songs. The music played varies from region to region, and in some areas foreign music, such as Edelweiss, become part of people's daily lives, reminding children to come home and signaling the end of the workday for employees. In addition, some towns use it as a public announcement system for local news, events, etc. However, these announcements are made in the morning. This has led to some small controversies among some residents.

An example of a Bosai Musen electronic siren playing a version of the Yuyake Koyake Japanese folk song as an end of day signal. Note that the horns are made by UNI-PEX and painted green.

Japan also had a less common large mechanical siren system used for music, made by Yamaha, called the Yamaha Music Siren, sounded at certain times of day presumably as an end of day signal like others. These sirens had many mechanical choppers with different port ratios to match a certain musical note. These choppers would have rotating stators in order to let each note play individually, in order to play music.

==== Philippines ====
Philippines has flood, typhoon, tsunami and air force base sirens. The entire system is the TOA speakers for flood warnings, Telegrafia Pavian for typhoon warnings, Federal Signal 3T22s at the Clark Air Base, an LK-2001 in Davao City, Several Model 2s and 7s, Sentry sirens and a Sircom SIBT along with ATI HPSS-16/32 for the tsunami warnings.

==== Indonesia ====
Indonesia has sirens to warn about earthquakes, volcano, floods or tsunamis following the 2004 Indian Ocean earthquake. Other sirens in Indonesia used as a Ramzan siren in mosques, and a 3-horn mechanical siren which is located in Java island. An Independence Day siren was also used in the country for anniversary, like the North American-made sirens, it uses a 1-horn mechanical siren that spins fast. The entire sirens for the natural disasters in Indonesia (Indonesian: Peringatan Dini) are Whelen WPS-2804, TOA loudspeakers for volcanoes, TOA loudspeakers for landslides and floods just like the one in Jakarta, and a Sircom SIBT, TOA speakers, and Federal Signal Modulator 6024, for tsunami warnings.

==== Thailand ====
Like Indonesia, Thailand has sirens to warn about tsunamis following the 2004 Indian Ocean earthquake. The entire system of a Thailand's tsunami sirens are Sircom, Alerting Communications of America (ACA), and American Signal Corporation (ASC). The entire system for the Thailand's tsunami warning siren systems are ACA Quadren, Sircom SIBT, and ASC E-Class (a similar siren to ATI HPSS-16/32).

==== Malaysia ====
Malaysia has a number of sirens in Peninsular Malaysia, and Borneo (Sabah and Sarawak), to warn about disasters such as tsunamis, similar to Indonesia, as well as floods, and dam failure. Other sirens in Malaysia will be a Malaysian Civil Defense Force's civil defense siren at the top of the building in both Semenanjung, Sabah and Sarawak, it uses a World War II Carter Air-Raid Siren, which is similar siren sound to a Federal Signal 3T22/2T22. The civil defense siren can be used as a Ramzan siren. The entire system for the disaster in Malaysia including the E2S A141, Telegrafia Pavian, a mysterious surveillance, antenna, PA speaker siren and a HSS Engineering TWS-295 (an under license Whelen WPS 2905) for the tsunami warnings, a TOA speaker, mysterious PA speaker, metal box siren, and a Telegrafia Pavian for the flood, and other will be air force base sirens such as 4 Federal Signal Modulator 3012s in RMAF Gong Kedak Air Base, and a dam failure warning system include 2 Federal Signal ThunderBeam RSH-10s in Bersia Dam and Kenering Dam and a Federal Signal 2001-SRN in Chenderoh Dam which was the first rotating US-Made tornado siren in Malaysia. There is also 2 unconfirmed STH-10s in Kenyir Dam and Labuan respectively, The Labuan STH-10 turned out to be a motor for the water gate, As for the Kenyir Dam siren, it’s still unconfirmed.

==== Singapore ====
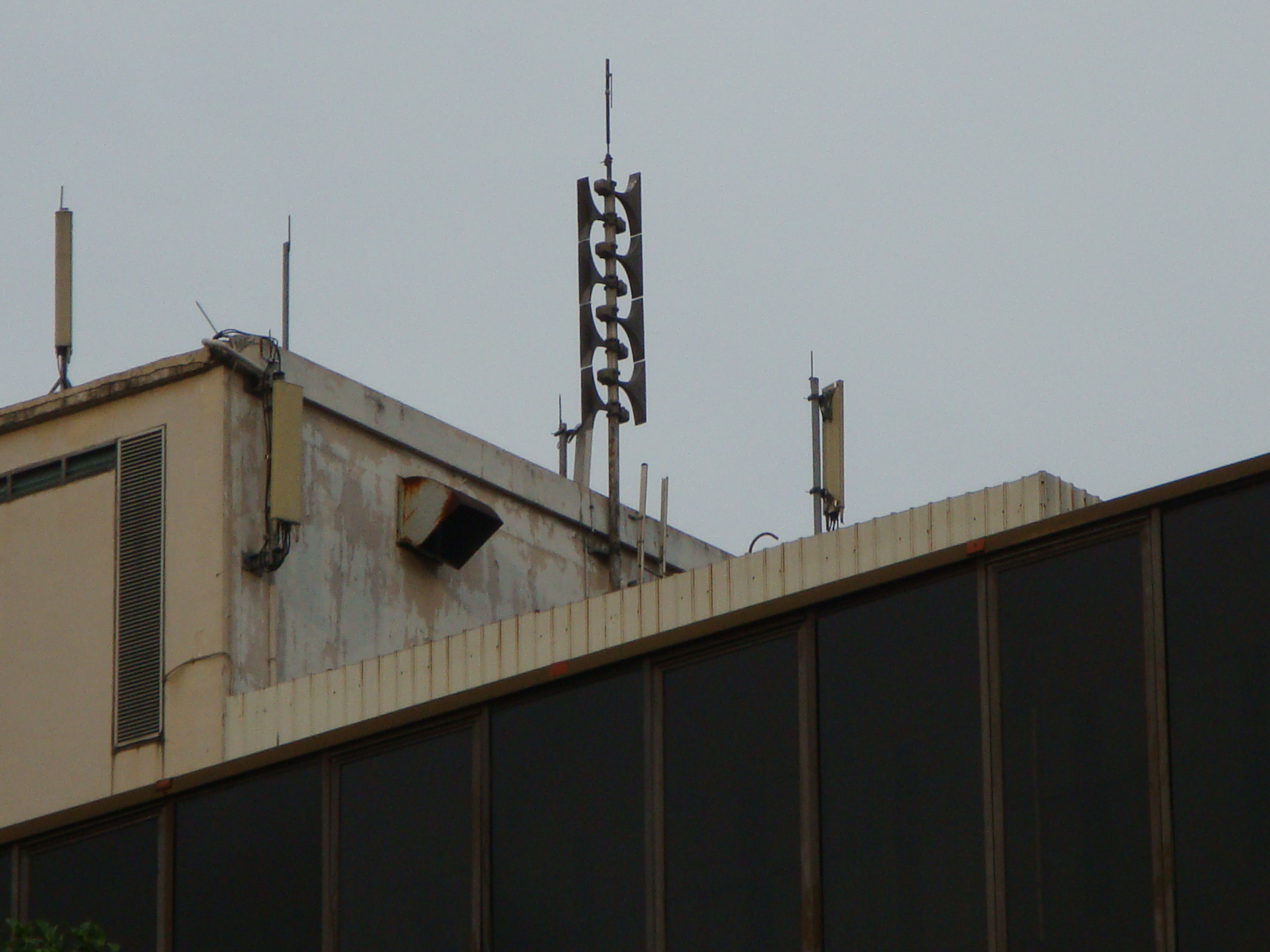
A public warning system siren in Singapore

Singapore currently has a network of 284 stationary sirens named the Public Warning System which warns the entire country of air raids, as well as human-made and natural disasters (except earth tremors). Singapore's sirens are tested at noon on the first day of every month. During the test, the sirens sound a light cheerful chime instead of any of the three signals. The sirens look very similar to the Hörmann ECN3000 (See picture).

==== South Korea ====
Nearly all towns and cities are equipped with civil defense sirens in case of natural disasters or missile attacks from North Korea. South Korea holds civil defense drills every month to prepare for such scenarios.

=== Europe ===
==== Austria ====
Austria is fully covered with an operational air-raid siren system consisting of 8,203 devices as of 2012. They are tested weekly at noon on Saturdays (except in Vienna) with the sirenenprobe signal, a 15-second continuous tone. Every year on the first Saturday of October, the whole range of alarm signals (with the exception of the fire alert) is sounded as a system test (Zivilschutz-Probealarm) and to familiarize the population with the signals.

- Warning: a three-minute continuous tone. People are warned of an incoming danger and advised to tune into the appropriate Ö2 regional radio station or ORF 2 for further instructions.
- General alarm: a one-minute ascending and descending tone. Danger is imminent; people should seek shelter immediately and listen to radio or TV.
- End of danger: a one-minute continuous tone. The danger is over, and shelters can be left. Any hazards potentially encountered during normal life are announced in the media.
- Fire alert: three 15-second continuous tones separated by seven-second intervals. All firemen of volunteer fire brigades should report to their fire station immediately. This signal is being used less and less, as many fire brigades have begun to alert their members by radio.

==== Belgium ====
Belgium used to test its air raid sirens every first Thursday of the trimester (three-month period). Sirens are Sonnenburg Electronic sirens. When the air-raid sirens are tested, the message proefsignaal or signal d'essai is broadcast every time the sirens sound. There are 540 sirens all across the country. A non-audible test was performed every day, and the last test occurred on 4 October 2018. Afterwards, the network was decommissioned. The sirens remain around nuclear facilities, but no tests are performed. The official recommendation is that people subscribe to BE-Alert, a system where information is provided via SMS, e-mail or phone.

==== Bulgaria ====
Bulgaria has over 4000 sirens deployed around in the country, especially Sofia. These are likely used to warn people of earthquakes. Sirens were first installed during WW2 to warn people of incoming attacks by Nazi Germany; these were replaced by electronic ones during the 1990s. The sirens are tested on the first workday of April and November every year to see if they are functioning properly. On 2 June every year, the day of Hristo Botev and demised ones for the liberation and independence of Bulgaria is commemorated with a one-minute signal, different from the usual tone. The public is informed about the test beforehand. The sirens are mainly electronic ones (German made type ECN units or other high powered speaker systems on top of public buildings). The signals may include – attack (a one-minute wailing tone used to indicate an incoming danger) and alert (sometimes referred to as the all clear signal which is a continuous single tone). Strong tremors in Bulgaria are quite rare, so a special earthquake warning system is not needed.

==== Czech Republic ====
The Czech Republic has around 6,000 sirens. Within these 6,000 sirens which include mechanical sirens and electronic sirens, are tested every first Wednesday of the month. There are three warning signals, which are accompanied by a verbal message in Czech and usually with an English and German translation on electronic sirens. There is also an emergency broadcast on TV channels, maintained by Czech Television, and radio channels, maintained by Czech Radio.

- General alert: a 140-second long fluctuating tone. The alert can be repeated up to three times in three-minute intervals with four possible verbal messages:
  - Všeobecná výstraha, všeobecná výstraha, všeobecná výstraha. Sledujte vysílání Českého rozhlasu, televize a regionálních rozhlasů. Všeobecná výstraha, všeobecná výstraha, všeobecná výstraha. The danger is unspecified and people should go inside a building, close the doors and windows (the alert usually means a dangerous element may be present in the air), and turn the TV or radio to an appropriate channel to find out more;
  - Nebezpečí zátopové vlny, nebezpečí zátopové vlny. Ohrožení zátopovou vlnou. Sledujte vysílání Českého rozhlasu, televize a regionálních rozhlasů. Nebezpečí zátopové vlny, nebezpečí zátopové vlny. A flooding alert. (Siren signals for Flooding alert is not used anymore). The required action is that people should turn on the radio and get away from the source of danger (usually a river);
  - Chemická havárie, chemická havárie, chemická havárie. Ohrožení únikem škodlivin. Sledujte vysílání Českého rozhlasu, televize a regionálních rozhlasů. Chemická havárie, chemická havárie, chemická havárie. There was a chemical accident. People should behave the same way as during an Obecná výstraha message;
  - Radiační havárie, radiační havárie, radiační havárie. Ohrožení únikem radioaktivních látek. Sledujte vysílání Českého rozhlasu, televize a regionálních rozhlasů. Radiační havárie, radiační havárie, radiační havárie. There was a radioactive accident. People should behave the same way as during an Obecná výstraha message.
- Testing of sirens: a 140-seconds long still tone, used to test the functionality of the sirens. Zkouška sirén, zkouška sirén, zkouška sirén. Za několik minut proběhne zkouška sirén. Zkouška sirén, zkouška sirén, zkouška sirén. is the verbal message before the test, and Zkouška sirén, zkouška sirén, zkouška sirén. Právě proběhla zkouška sirén. Zkouška sirén, zkouška sirén, zkouška sirén. is the verbal message after the test.
- Fire alert: a one-minute long still tone with a pause. It is used to alert firefighters of a fire, accompanied by this verbal message: Požární poplach, požární poplach, požární poplach. Svolání hasičů, svolání hasičů. Byl vyhlášen požární poplach. Požární poplach.

==== Denmark ====
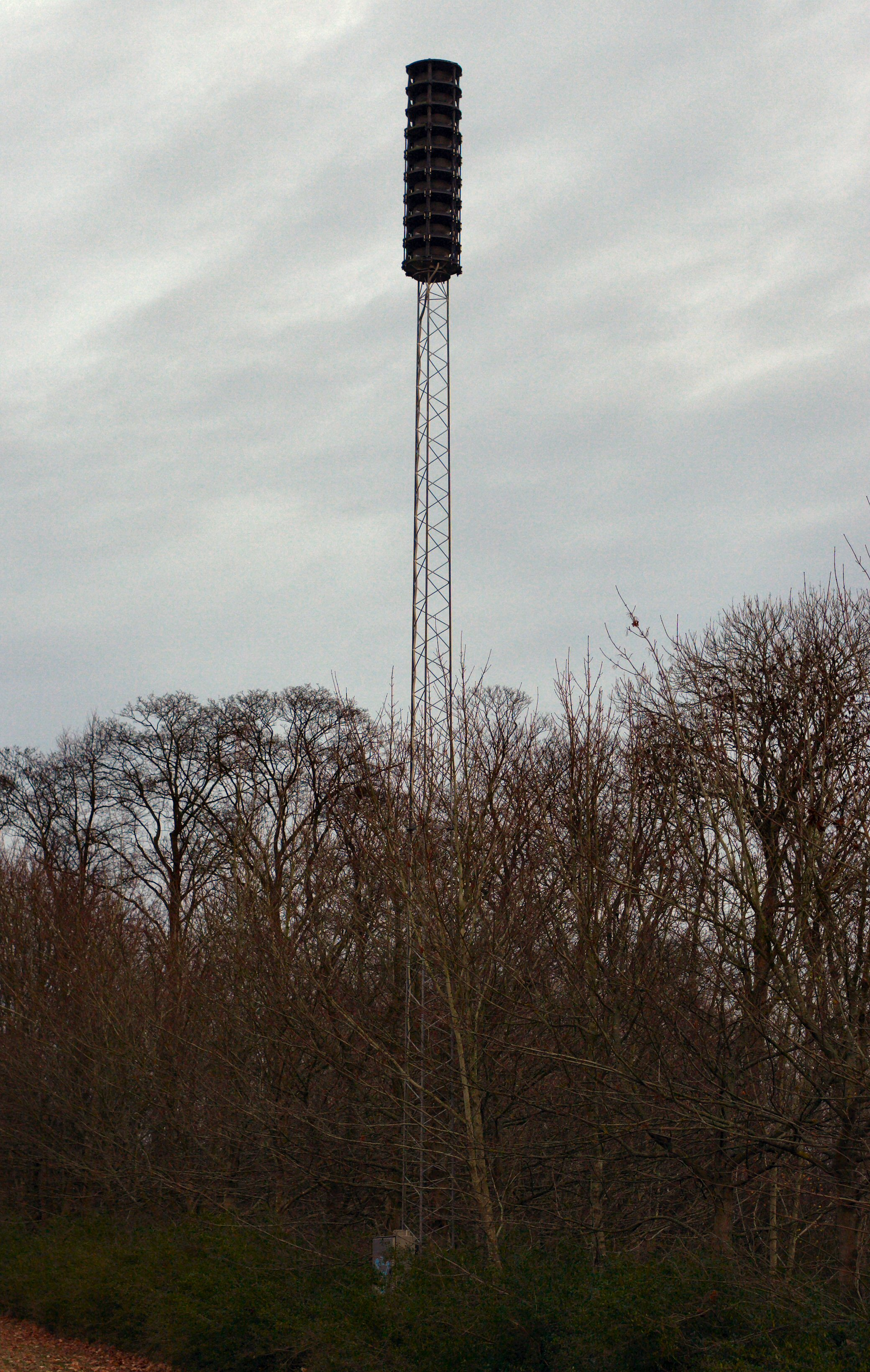
Model WPS 2809

There are 1,078 electronic warning sirens have been installed in Denmark by HSS Engineering and were actually license built Whelen WPS 2800 sirens. The sirens are placed on the tops of buildings or on masts. This warning system makes it possible to warn the populations of all urban areas with more than 1,000 inhabitants. This means that about 80% of Denmark's population can be warned using stationary sirens. The remaining 20% are warned by mobile sirens mounted on police cars. The function of the sirens is tested every night, but does not produce any sound. Once every year, on the first Wednesday of May at 12:00, the sirens are tested with sound.

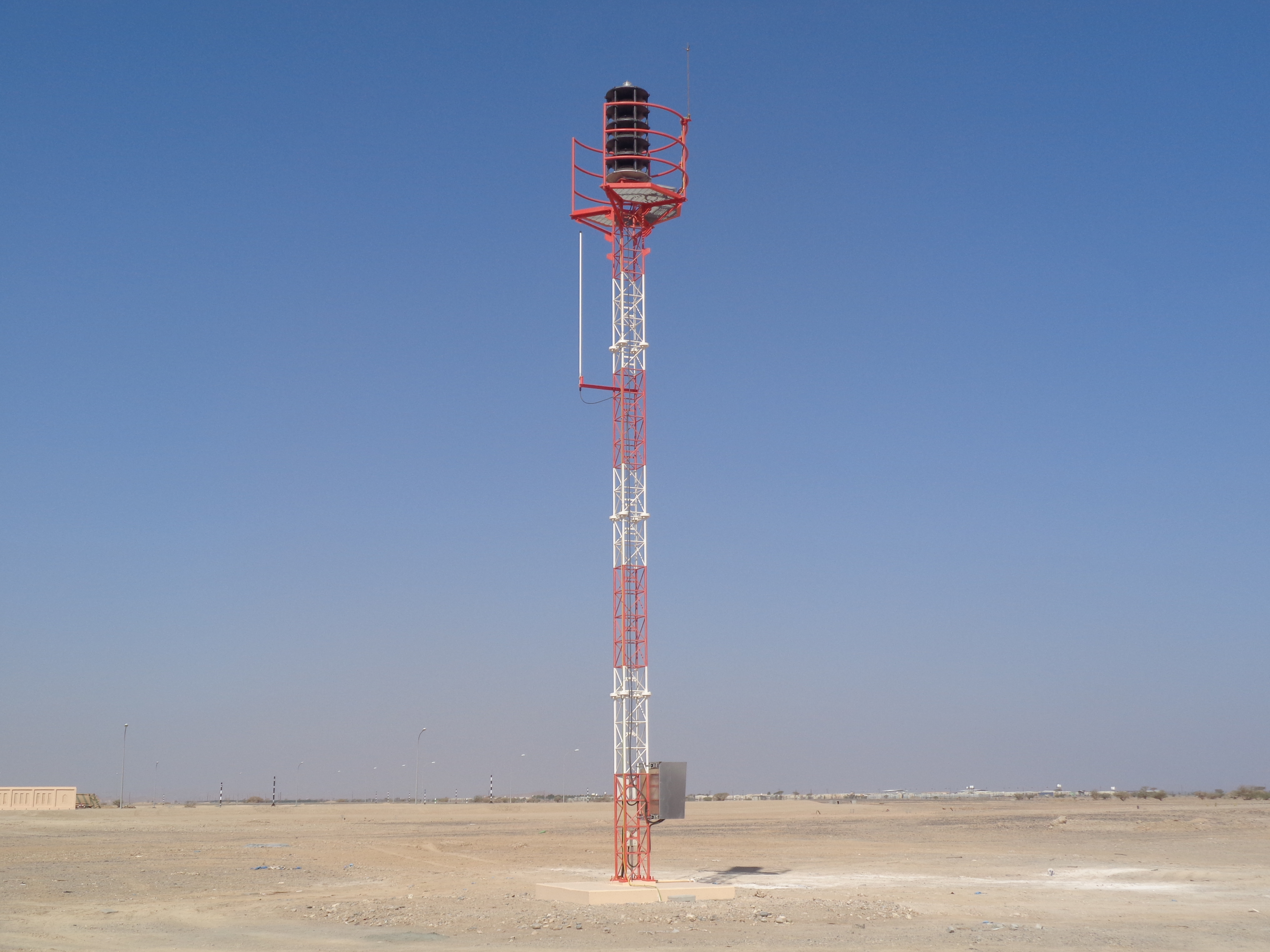
A HSS Engineering TWS-295 (Whelen WPS 2805) electronic siren

External videos
- YouTube
- Annual Danish Warning Siren Test/ Luftalarm Test 2022 (Whelen WPS 2809 Kirkendrup)

==== Finland ====
A general alarm consists of a repeating one-minute sound, made up of tones that ascend for seven seconds and descend for seven seconds. The end of danger is signaled by a one-minute continuous tone. Warning sirens are tested on the first Monday of every month at noon. The testing alarm is shorter than the general alarm (only lasting for seven or fourteen seconds) and may be a flat tone. The system commonly uses Teho-Ulvo sirens, which are electronic and are powered by horn loudspeaker arrays. They are known for their very distinctive wind-ups and wind-downs.

==== France ====
In France, the emergency population warning network is called the Réseau national d'alerte (RNA). The system is inherited from the air raid siren network (défense passive) developed before World War II. It consists of about 4,500 electronic or electromechanical sirens placed all over France. The system is tested each month at noon on the first Wednesday. The most common siren type is the electromechanical KM Europ eight-port single-tone siren. These sirens have a very characteristic sound: a very fast wind-up and a lower pitch than most sirens (the pitch is comparable to a Federal Signal STL-10 on a lower frequency). A recording of these sirens was used in the movie Silent Hill.

==== Germany ====
In Germany, the Warnämter ('warning authorities') were closed in the 1990s after the threat of the Cold War was over, since the ability to alert the public was then considered unnecessary. As the civil defense sirens were also frequently used to alert volunteer firefighters, many sirens were sold to municipalities for a symbolic price; others were dismantled. In the 2000s, it was realized that the ability to warn the public is not only necessary in cases of war, but also in events like natural disasters, chemical or nuclear accidents, or terrorist attacks. As a result, some cities like Düsseldorf and Dresden began to rebuild their warning sirens. In Hamburg, the sirens are still operational. They also warn the public during storm surges; for instance, all towns in the Moselle Valley continue to operate and test their warning sirens. The majority of operational sirens in Germany are either electric-mechanical type E57 or electronic sirens.

There are no precise official numbers as to how many sirens there used to be, as most of the documents regarding the system's construction and upkeep have been disposed of after the Cold War ended. However, estimates place the number of operational sirens during the system's peak at around 80,000 in West Germany alone. Accounts as to how many of those sirens are still in operation vary significantly depending on the source. The most prominent German company regarding manufacturing and maintenance of sirens, Hörmann Industries, states on its website that they are in charge of maintaining over 60,000 sirens. Granted, that includes mobile sirens that can be mounted on vehicles, but one can deduct from this information that there could be at least around 50,000 stationary sirens still in operation today, many of the once electro-mechanical sirens having been replaced with newer electronic models.

During World War II, Berlin's air raid sirens became known by the city's residents as Meier's trumpets or Meier's hunting horns due to Luftwaffe chief Hermann Goering's boast that "If a single bomb ever falls on Berlin, you can call me Meier!".

Audio sample of a mechanical siren in Germany

==== Hungary ====
The installation of sirens across the country was requested by the Minister of National Defense in 1938. Various models from several companies were used, and some were manufactured locally in Hungary under license from the companies owning the designs. The FM Si 41 model originates from Germany, the TESLA/Braun-Bovery siren originates from a Swiss company, and the EKA series and DINAMO sirens were manufactured locally in Hungary.

There were 25 air raid warning zones in Hungary. Only the larger towns and cities were afforded electric sirens, the rest of the country used hand-crank sirens, in addition to warnings broadcast by radio. The electric sirens were controlled via phone lines and were operated from a central location, such as a city hall, fire station, post office, or local military base or outpost.

Initially, there were only two siren signals, similar to the signals used in Britain at the time: Red Alert, or Air Raid Warning signal, indicating an imminent threat, and All Clear, indicating the danger had passed.

In 1944, the signal system was updated to four total signals:

1. Air Warning – 30 seconds of continuous siren sounding. Used when enemy combatants entered within 150 km of the area
2. Red Alert, Air Raid Warning – issued when enemy combatants were estimated to arrive within 15 minutes
3. Air Warning Over – issued when enemy combatants were leaving the immediate area and the attack was considered over
4. All Clear – issued when the enemy combatants moved back past the 150 km range

After the conclusion of World War II siren installation continued throughout the country. Previously unfurnished towns were equipped with the same type of sirens that were installed during the war, as those models were still kept in production. In the 1960s, after allying with the Soviet Union, Hungary planned to replace the aging siren systems installed during the war with sirens that were produced in other communist countries like Czechoslovakia and East Germany. In the early 1970s, a massive siren replacement program began. Nearly all sirens were replaced with the DDR DS977 and MEZ models. Some of the siren models that were used during the war were still in production, so some areas did receive "WW2-Type" sirens.

The sirens installed during the 70s were and remain as property of the National Civil Defense. These more modern installations weren't controlled via telephone lines, but by sound-activated receivers. Each installation had a remote control unit at the local police station, fire station or Civil Defense Office that would transmit the specific frequencies that would activate the sirens in the surrounding areas. Testing and maintaining this system was problematic, as the remote control unit was not allowed to be used to run tests and only to be operated in legitimate use cases of war or emergency. Civil Defense workers had to manually go to and test each individual siren in the system that was registered to their station. With only a few Civil Defense stations per county, any given station would be responsible for several cities, towns and villages, making maintenance take significant amounts of time. A rare few of these Cold-War–era siren systems were equipped with phone line control systems, these were mostly located around nuclear shelters.

In the late 1990s, the remote control system was deemed unstable and unreliable. With the fall of the Soviet Union in 1991, the likelihood of war was low, and the National Warning System was abandoned.

In the mid-2000s, the MoLaRi System was built around factories that work with hazardous materials, to warn surrounding areas in case of emergency or risk to public health or safety. These systems continue to be installed near facilities that work with hazardous materials.

In 2011, a National Civil Defense Drill was held to see how many of the sirens abandoned for decades still functioned. Many of them did not work, and while some counties decided to repair the sirens and start doing yearly growl tests again, others decided to leave the abandoned systems as they were. A few cities and counties kept their sirens active and in good condition, and still perform repairs, maintenance, and yearly tests, like Győr-Moson-Sopron county, Heves county, Hajdú-Bihar county, and Jász-Nagykun-Szolnok county.

In 2014 regular testing of the MoLaRi sirens near hazardous materials facilities began, testing is performed on the first Monday of each month at 11:00, this is most easily heard in and around Budapest, where a large number of these facilities are located

The remaining siren systems that were found to be non-functional have been dismantled or left in place. Emergency Plan documents for some towns still state that citizens will be warned with the use of sirens, despite these systems being defunct.

The government has attempted to destroy all old siren systems that were dismantled, out of fear that intact systems could be activated and cause panic. The Civil Defense Office currently relies on radio, TV, and phone alerts to warn the population in case of emergency, and in some emergency plans, church bells are included as a potential warning system.

There are four current siren signals, used by the MoLaRi system, HÖRMANN sirens, and on the old siren systems where they are still maintained:

1. Air-Raid Alert – a 30-second continuous sounding with pitch alternating between 280 Hz and 400 Hz, repeated three times, with 30-second pauses between soundings
2. Emergency Alarm – a 120-second continuous sounding with pitch alternating between 133 Hz and 400 Hz
3. All Clear a 30-second continuous sounding with a constant pitch of 400 Hz, repeated twice, with 30-second pauses between the signals
4. Test Alarm – a six-second sounding ramping up to 400 Hz over the duration

==== Italy ====
The Italian War Ministry began installing air raid sirens and issuing air defence regulations in 1938. Production was entrusted to La Sonora, founded in 1911 and still active today.

During World War II, every town had a siren, and several were present in each large city. Even after the danger of bombings had ended, they were kept to provide warning in case of any threat (e.g. high water in Venice).

As of 2015, some of them still survive. For instance, as many as 34 have been located in Rome using crowdsourcing. Up until the 1980s, they underwent routine maintenance and sounded at noon.

Additionally, the Protezione Civile (Civil Protection) operates sirens to warn the public in case of a threat to the citizen population. Protezione Civile also provides transport needs and military defence for the Government of Italy. These defence systems were put in place in the 1990s and are occasionally still used today.

Urbania, Italy has a British Secomak GP3 air raid siren which is annually activated in honor of the Bombing in Urbania, which took place during World War II.

Ferrara, Italy has a system of Whelen (remodeled HSS-TWS series) sirens that warn of industrial risks in the area.

==== Lithuania ====
Lithuania operates sirens from the Cold War mainly in suburban areas of big cities such as Vilnius, Klaipėda, Kaunas, Šiauliai, Panevėžys and or others. The most common models are Elektror, Siemens and Hörmann, even though Federal Signal is not too rare in these areas. These sirens can be found in fire stations, factories, police stations and city halls. The attack and all clear signal is used for tests even though tests aren't as frequent as in other areas across Northern Europe. They soundnoff in case of fires, chemical issues, floods, incoming enemy attack, etc. Testing date for most areas is most likely yearly.

==== Netherlands ====
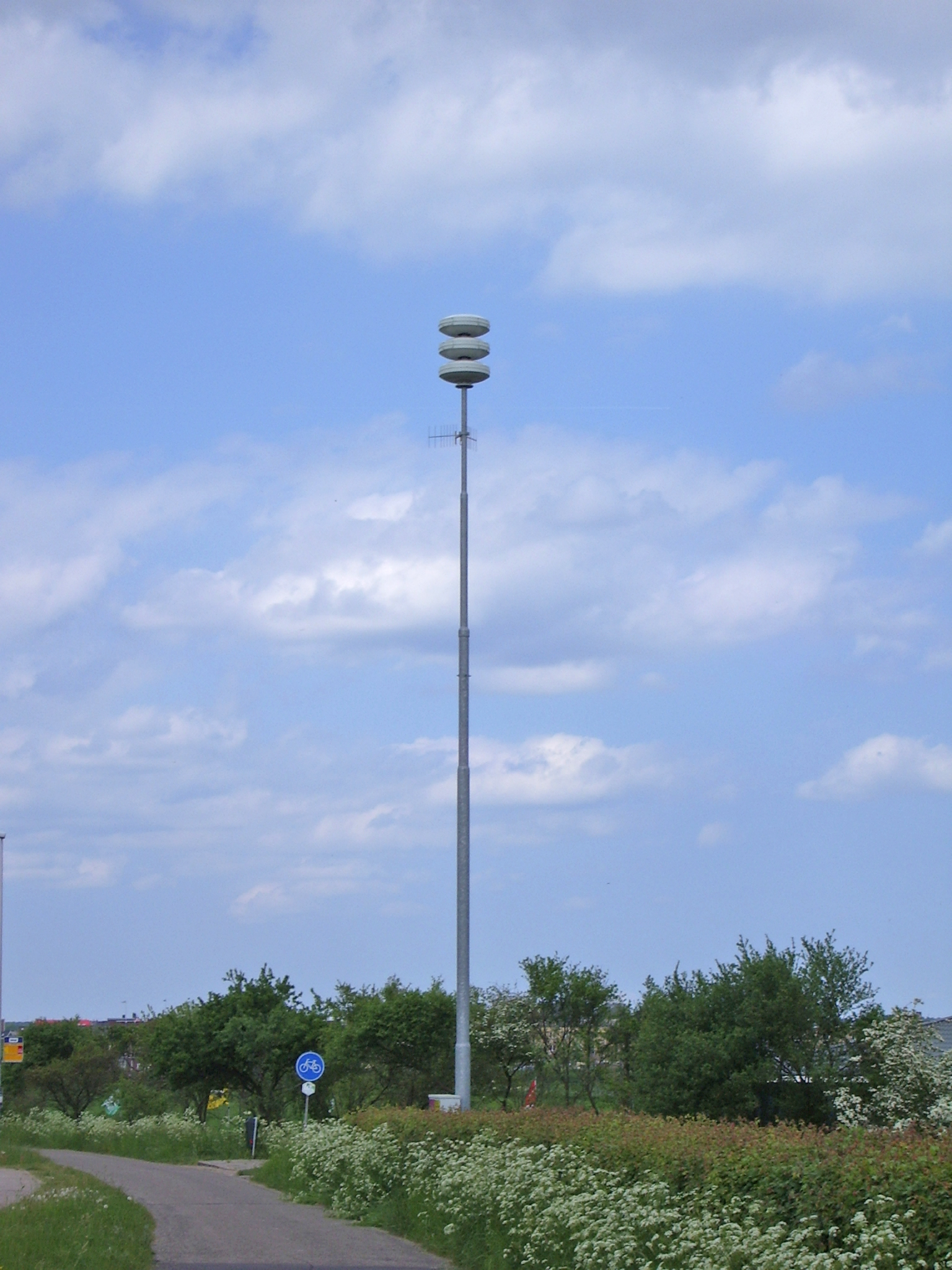
Federal Signal Modulator 2008: Netherlands Electronic Air Raid Siren

External videos
- YouTube
- Dutch mobile phone emergency message & air raid alarm test

The Netherlands tests its air-raid sirens once per month, on the first Monday at noon, to keep the public aware of the system. There are about 4,200 sirens placed all across the country. In March 2015 it was announced that, due to high maintenance costs, the sirens will be taken out of service by the end of 2020. The government has implemented a Cell Broadcast system called NL-Alert, compliant to the mandatory European regulation EU-Alert, to replace the sirens by 2021. However, as of early 2022, the sirens will continue to be heard until another decision has been made.

==== Norway ====
Norway has about 1,250 operational sirens (mostly Kockums air horn units rather than motorized sirens), primarily located in cities. Three different signals are used:

- Critical message, listen to radio: three periods of three signals, separated by one minute between the periods. The critical message signal is followed by a radio broadcast. It is used in peacetime to warn the population about major accidents, large fires and gas leaks.
- Air raid, take cover: an intermittent signal lasting for about a minute.
- All clear: a continuous signal sounded for about 30 seconds.

The sirens are tested twice each year, at noon on the second Wednesday of January and June. As of 2014, only the critical message signal is used during tests. Previously, the signal tested in June would use the air raid and all clear signals. The latter two are no longer used in peacetime.

There are also sirens in the Storfjorden area in Møre og Romsdal county to warn about an avalanche from the mountain Åkerneset. These sirens are not operated by Norwegian Civil Defense department; instead, they are operated by Åksnes/Tafjord Beredskap. These sirens can be found in the villages of Stranda, Tafjord, Geiranger, Hellesylt, Linge, and Valldal.

==== Poland ====
There are numerous civil defense sirens employed throughout Poland. Though the testing schedule is unclear, sirens are commonly sounded on the anniversary of the Warsaw Uprising. As in other parts of the world, many of the country's volunteer fire stations utilize civil defense sirens for fire calls. Many of these stations will use a two siren set-up; one unit being high pitched, the other being low pitched.

External videos
- YouTube
- 2 syreny Kaczyckiej OSP !!!

==== Portugal ====
Portugal has hundreds of sirens placed across the country. Urban areas most likely use a few electronic sirens even though the presence of warning sirens is more common in suburban or rural areas, where fire stations use them for fire calls. These kinds of sirens are dual-tone and mechanical and are the most common kind of warning siren in Portugal. Between the 2000s and the early 2010s, a few fire sirens were decommissioned due to maintenance upkeep even though most of them remain active.

==== Romania ====
In Romania, civil defense sirens have been used since the early 1930s. Originally, each street had a small siren on top of a high-rise building, which could be powered mechanically. During World War II, the sirens had a single continuous tone to warn of an air strike.

Throughout the Cold War, larger sirens were manufactured locally and installed on various public buildings and residences. The sirens were able to transmit a comprehensive variety of tones, each with a different meaning such as a chemical disaster, an earthquake, a flood, or an imminent air or nuclear strike; each of these tones required the population to either move to higher ground or an ABC shelter. An all clear signal was played after the area had been deemed safe for the general public.

Since the 1990s, civil defense sirens have been replaced by electronic sirens and the procedure has been simplified. As of 2013, there are four playable tones: a natural disaster warning, an upcoming air/nuclear strike, an imminent air/nuclear strike, and an all clear signal. Taking shelter is no longer a legal requirement, although ABC shelters are still operational.

In August 2017, Romanian authorities started to perform monthly defence siren tests. The first such test took place on 2 August 2017 and is scheduled to be repeated on the first Wednesday of each month, between 10:00 and 11:00 am local time. Such tests have been stopped in the wake of the COVID-19 pandemic.

==== Russia ====
During the siege of Leningrad, the radio network carried information for the population about raids and air alerts. The famous "metronome" went down in the history of the siege of Leningrad as a cultural monument of resistance of the population.

At that time, there were more than a thousand loudspeakers and four hundred thousand radio streams operating in the city. If there were no broadcast programs, then the metronome was broadcast with a slow rhythm of 50–55 beats per minute. The network was switched on around the clock, which allowed the population and services to be confident in the operation of the network. By order of the MPVO headquarters, the duty officer of the Central station of the radio network interrupted the broadcast of the program, turned on an electric player with a record of the alarm text. This record was supplemented by 400 electric sirens. At the end of the recording, the metronome was switched on with a rapid rhythm of 160–180 beats per minute. When the danger was over, the electric player was switched on again by order of the staff, and the alarm was sounded in the streets and houses, accompanied by the sound of fanfares.

==== Slovenia ====
Slovenia has 1,563 operable civil defence sirens. Most of them are electronic sirens, although there are some mechanical ones. Civil defence sirens are mounted on fire stations, town halls, or other structures.

Three siren tones are used in the country:

- Warning (Opozorilo na nevarnost): two-minute–long steady tone. Serves as a warning of the impending danger of a fire, natural or other type of disaster, or high water level.
- Immediate danger (Neposredna nevarnost): one-minute wailing tone. Used in case of dangers, such as major fires, floods, radiological or chemical danger and air raid.
- All clear – end of danger (Konec nevarnosti): thirty-second steady tone. It is heard during tests of air raid sirens each month on the first Saturday of each month at noon, and at the end of an emergency for which the immediate danger signal was sounded.

Since 1 September 1998, there are two additional siren tones, which are used in certain Slovenian municipalities. The municipalities of Hrastnik and Trbovlje use a special signal (called Neposredna nevarnost nesreče s klorom) for the immediate danger in case of an accident involving chlorine when there is a danger of chlorine leaks in the environment. The 100-second-long signal consists of a 30-second wailing tone immediately followed by a 40-second steady tone and again of a 30-second wailing tone. The municipalities of Muta, Vuzenica, Podvelka, Radlje ob Dravi, Brežice, Krško and Sevnica use a 100-second-long wailing signal (named Neposredna nevarnost poplavnega vala) (consisting of four-second bursts separated by four seconds of silence) for the immediate danger of flash floods, used in case of overflow or collapse of a hydroelectric dam.

In case of emergencies when air raid sirens are deployed (natural disasters, severe floods, air raid etc.) people are advised to tune into regional or local radio/TV station(s) serving the affected area. The first channel of the public Radio Slovenia, Val 202 and the first and second channel of the public broadcaster RTV Slovenija also distribute such public warnings and information, especially if a calamity affects multiple regions at the same time, or the whole country. Public channels can also distribute calamity-related warnings and information related to calamities of smaller extent (local/regional) if that is determined in written municipal public emergency response and preparedness-related procedure plans

Until 1 January 1998, air-raid sirens were tested each Saturday at noon. The formerly used warning signals were:

- General public mobilisation (Splošna javna mobilizacija): three-minute long ascending and descending tone, consisting of alternating ten-second bursts and five seconds of silence
- Immediate danger of air raid (Zračna nevarnost): one-minute wailing tone
- ABC (chemical, biological, nuclear disaster) alarm (Radiacijsko-biološko-kemična nevarnost): 90-second tone, consisting of three twenty-second ascending and descending bursts, separated by fifteen seconds of silence
- Fire alarm (Požarna nevarnost): 90-second tone, consisting of three 20-second steady bursts, separated by fifteen seconds of silence
- (Natural) disaster (Nevarnost naravnih nesreč): 60-second signal with alternating 20 seconds of steady tone, 20 seconds of ascending and descending tone and another 20-second steady tone
- All clear (Konec nevarnosti): 60-second steady tone

==== Spain ====
Few sirens that were used for civil defence against bombings during the Spanish Civil War are preserved. The Guernica siren has a highly symbolic value because of the impact of the Bombing of Guernica. Barcelona City History Museum preserves one related to the Bombing of Barcelona, and another siren from civil war years is also preserved in Valencia. There are another sirens that still sound in Barbastro and Logroño. Another hidden siren is located at Garibai Street in San Sebastián and it still tests at 12:00 in the noon.

Audio sample of a civil defence siren in Sweden. The siren located in the Garibai street in San Seb is tested as 12:00 noon every day (according to City Tour).

==== Sweden ====
The Swedish alarm system uses outdoor sirens in addition to information transmitted through radio and television and sent by text messages and mobile apps. Special radio receivers are handed out to residents living near nuclear power plants. The outdoor system Viktigt meddelande till allmänheten, also known as Hesa Fredrik ('Hoarse Fredrik', alluding to the sound of the siren) to the Swedish population, consists of 4,600 sirens. These sirens were first tested in 1931, and were mounted to cars and bikes sent out by the government. The sirens can be found on tall buildings all around Sweden. They are driven by compressed air in giant tanks, but are successively being replaced by modern electronic sirens which use speakers. The emergency services are also able to send out spoken messages through the new sirens. The outdoor signals used are as follows:

- Readiness alarm (Beredskapslarm): a five-minute pattern of 30-second tones separated by 15-second gaps. Used when an imminent danger of war is present.
- Air raid alarm (Flyglarm): a one-minute pattern of two-second tones separated by two-second gaps. Sent when the threat of an air attack is imminent.
- Important public announcement, general alarm (Viktigt meddelande till allmänheten): a pattern of seven-second-long tones and fourteen-second-long gaps. People should go inside, close windows and doors, close ventilation, and listen to radio channel P4. Information may also be given via television and text-television.
- All clear (Faran över): a 30-second-long single tone. Used for all above signals when danger is over.

The outdoor sirens are tested four times a year on the first non-holiday Monday of March, June, September, and December at 15:00 local time. The test consists of the general alarm for two minutes, followed by a 90-second gap before the all clear is sounded.

There are usually around 15 to 20 general alarms, occurring locally, per year. The most common cause of general alarms is fire, specially in situations that involve industries, landfills, and other facilities containing dangerous substances which can create hazardous smoke. The 2018 peak in alarms (54 that year) is attributed to the 2018 Sweden wildfires which alone caused over 20 general alarms. Other possible attributing factors could be the increased public safety awareness after the 2017 Stockholm truck attack.

==== Switzerland ====
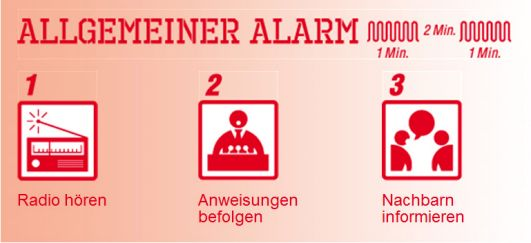
There are 8,200 alarm sirens for civil protection throughout Switzerland. They are tested once a year on the first Wednesday in February. Sound of the general-alarm signal Sound of the water-alarm signal

Switzerland currently has 8,500 mobile and stationary civil defense sirens, which can alert 99% of the population. There are also 700 sirens located near dams. Every year on the first Wednesday of February, Switzerland's sirens are tested to see if they are functioning properly. During this test, general alert sirens as well as sirens near dams are checked. The population is informed of the test in the days leading up to the tests by radio, television, teletext, and newspapers, and the siren tests do not require the population to take any special measures.

The tones of the different sirens are provided on the last page of all phone books as well as on the Internet.

- General alert: a one-minute regularly ascending and descending tone, followed by a two-minute interval of silence before repeating. The 'general alert' siren goes off when there is a possible threat to the population. The population is instructed to inform those around them to proceed inside. Once inside, people are instructed to listen to emergency broadcasts made by the broadcasting networks SRF, RTS, RSI and RSR.
- Flood alert: 12 continuous low-pitched tones, each lasting 20 seconds. The flood alert is activated once the general siren is sounding. If heard by the population in danger zones (such as near dams), they must leave the dangerous area immediately or find shelter.

==== Ukraine ====
Ukraine has employed civil defense sirens to warn citizens of danger during the Russian invasion of Ukraine.

The observed use of sirens in Ukraine has been the following:

- Danger threat: Repeated long bursts
- All Clear: Final Short burst

Ukraine's air raid alert system is one of the most advanced in the world. It is coordinated and operated by the Ukrainian National Emergency Service Center (DSNS) in order to provide rapid warning to the population and reduce casualties in the event of a sustained Russian attack. The system is operated in concert by a network of sirens, mobile apps, and social media push notifications, and integrates intelligence from the army. Its most unique point is the ability to make different warning lengths depending on the type of threat and the trajectory of the attack. When Russian warplanes begin taxiing or warships are about to leave a harbor, the alert goes off immediately. Sometimes, the warning can also be made 4–6 hours in advance. In the case of Iranian-made Shahed missile patrols, the warning is given one hour in advance. However, for ballistic and supersonic missiles, the warning time is only 5–10 minutes, but even a few seconds of warning is important.In addition, in order to increase the effectiveness of warnings, Ukraine has developed an app called Alarm Map, which displays in real time the status of air raid warnings throughout the country. This allows residents to have quick access to up-to-date security information so that they can take timely protective measures.

Air Alert is an air raid warning app developed by Ukrainian company Ajax Systems and web development company Stfalcon. In early 2022, at the beginning of the Russian-Ukrainian war, the app was quickly launched and integrated government data to provide real-time air raid alerts. As of July 2023, the app has been downloaded more than 15 million times. According to research, the app can reduce civilian casualties by 35%-45%.

Since the Russian invasion of Ukraine in 2022, air raid sirens have sounded more than 40,000 times, and these alert citizens to seek shelter. However, the frequency is so high that many residents no longer choose asylum. This usually depends on the time, place and personal situation, and some people give up because it is too late to seek asylum. The continued attacks pose a serious threat to the physical and psychological health of the residents.

==== United Kingdom ====
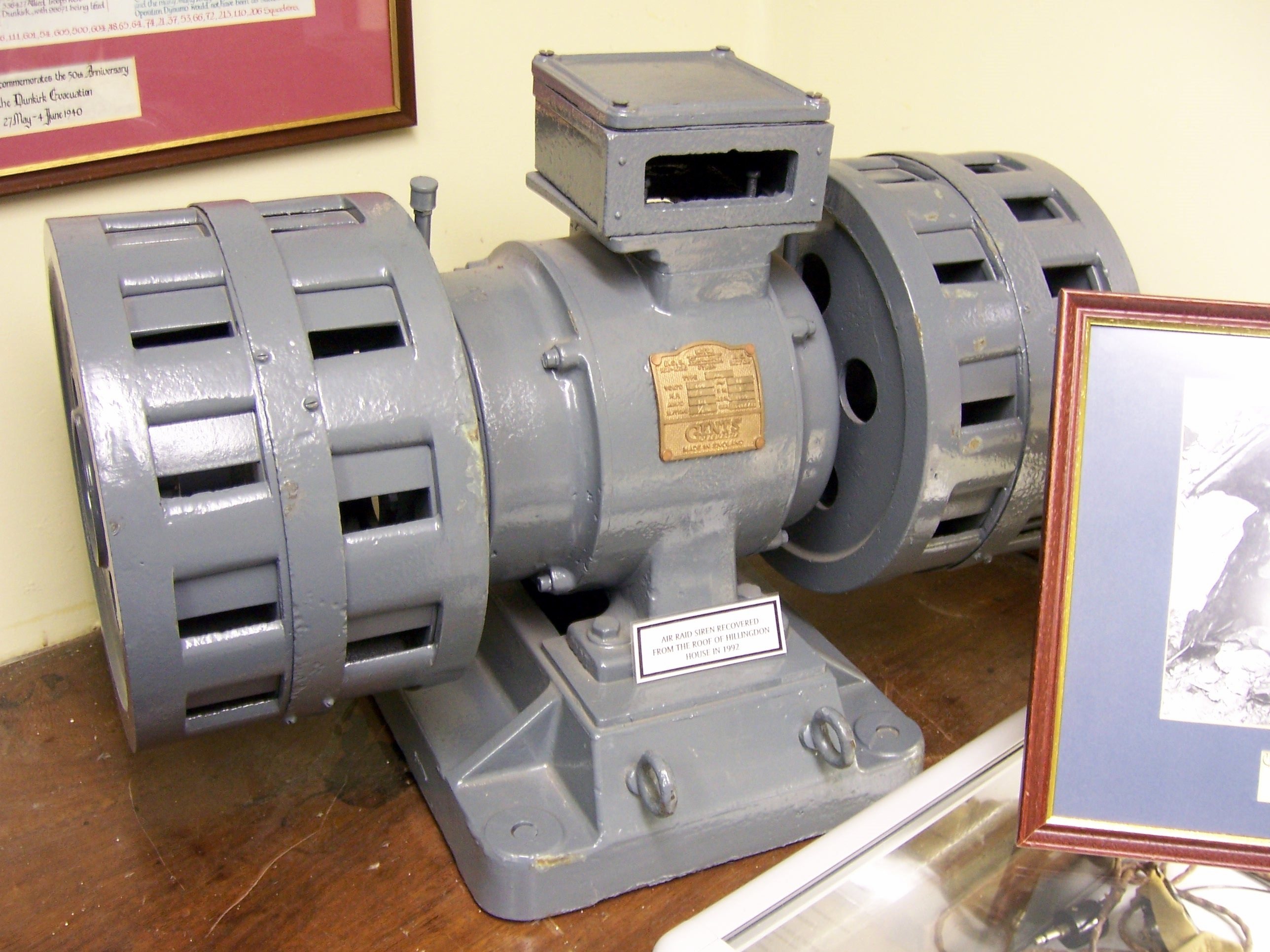
A Second World War-era Gents air raid siren, originally sited at RAF Uxbridge in Greater London. Unlike other Gents air raid sirens, this is a 10/12/15 tritone siren which gives off a unique warning tone.

Alert
Air raid siren: Alert, England

All clear
Air raid siren: All clear, England

During World War II, Britain had two warning tones:

- Red warning: attack in progress or imminent (attack/wail)
- All clear: attack over (steady alert)

These tones would be initiated by the Royal Observer Corps after spotting Luftwaffe aircraft coming toward Britain, with the help of coastal radar stations. The red warning would be sounded when the Royal Observer Corps spotted enemy aircraft in the immediate area. The sirens were tested periodically by emitting the tones in reverse order, with the all clear tone followed by the red warning tone. This ensured the public would not confuse a test with a real warning.

Every village, town, and city in the United Kingdom used to have a network of dual-tone sirens to warn of incoming air raids during World War II. The operation of the sirens was coordinated by a wire broadcast system via police stations. In towns and cities with a population of over 3,000, powered sirens were used, whereas in rural areas hand-operated sirens were used (which were later put to use as warnings for nuclear attack during the Cold War). At the end of the Cold War in 1992, the siren network was decommissioned, and very few remain. These sirens, mostly built by Carter, Gents, Castle Castings, and Secomak (now Klaxon Signal Co.), have 10 and 12 ports to create a minor third interval (B♭ and D♭ notes) and are probably the world's most recognised World War II air raid siren sound. Recordings of British sirens are often dubbed into movies set in countries which never used this type of siren.

Around 1,200 sirens remain, mostly used to warn the public of severe flooding. They are also used for public warning near gas or nuclear power plants, nuclear submarine bases, oil refineries and chemical plants. The remaining sirens are a mix of older motor driven models (usually from World War II), such as the Carter siren manufactured by Carter's of Nelson or the "syren" manufactured by Gent's of Leicester, and Cold War like Castle Castings and Secomak (now Klaxon Signal Co.) and newer electronic sirens like Hormann ECN, Whelen, Federal Signal Modulator, ATI HPSS and COOPER WAVES. Most of them usually tested annually between August and September if they're not in a siren system. They are also used to start and finish silences on Armistice Day and Remembrance Sunday

There was a siren system consisted mainly of Castle Castings and two Secomak GP3s for their flood warning system sector. When MoD was decommissioning these systems across the country, Norfolk kept their sector back for flood warning. With the advent of digital services and mobile technology, many local authorities are now retiring their siren networks in favour of contacting people by telephone. In January 2007, proposals to retire a network of sirens in Norfolk were made by the Norfolk Resilience Forum. In November 2007, residents were angered after the sirens had not sounded following a tidal surge in Walcott. In 2008, a review of the current and future role of flood warning sirens was undertaken by Norfolk County Council, after plans to retire them were halted following concerns from nearby residents. Although some of the sirens were initially withdrawn, 40 out of the 57 were eventually temporarily reinstated. Despite this, in July 2010 the flood warning sirens were finally retired in favour of alerting people by telephone, SMS or e-mail. After three years of consultations, the council had failed to demonstrate that refurbishing the sirens would be a worthwhile investment. The whole siren system was completely gone by late 2013, with only two sirens remaining, which are both inactive with one of them refurbished and put on display on a beach not far from its original location, and another, in Mundesley Fire Station, just standing there, extremely unlikely to ever sound again.

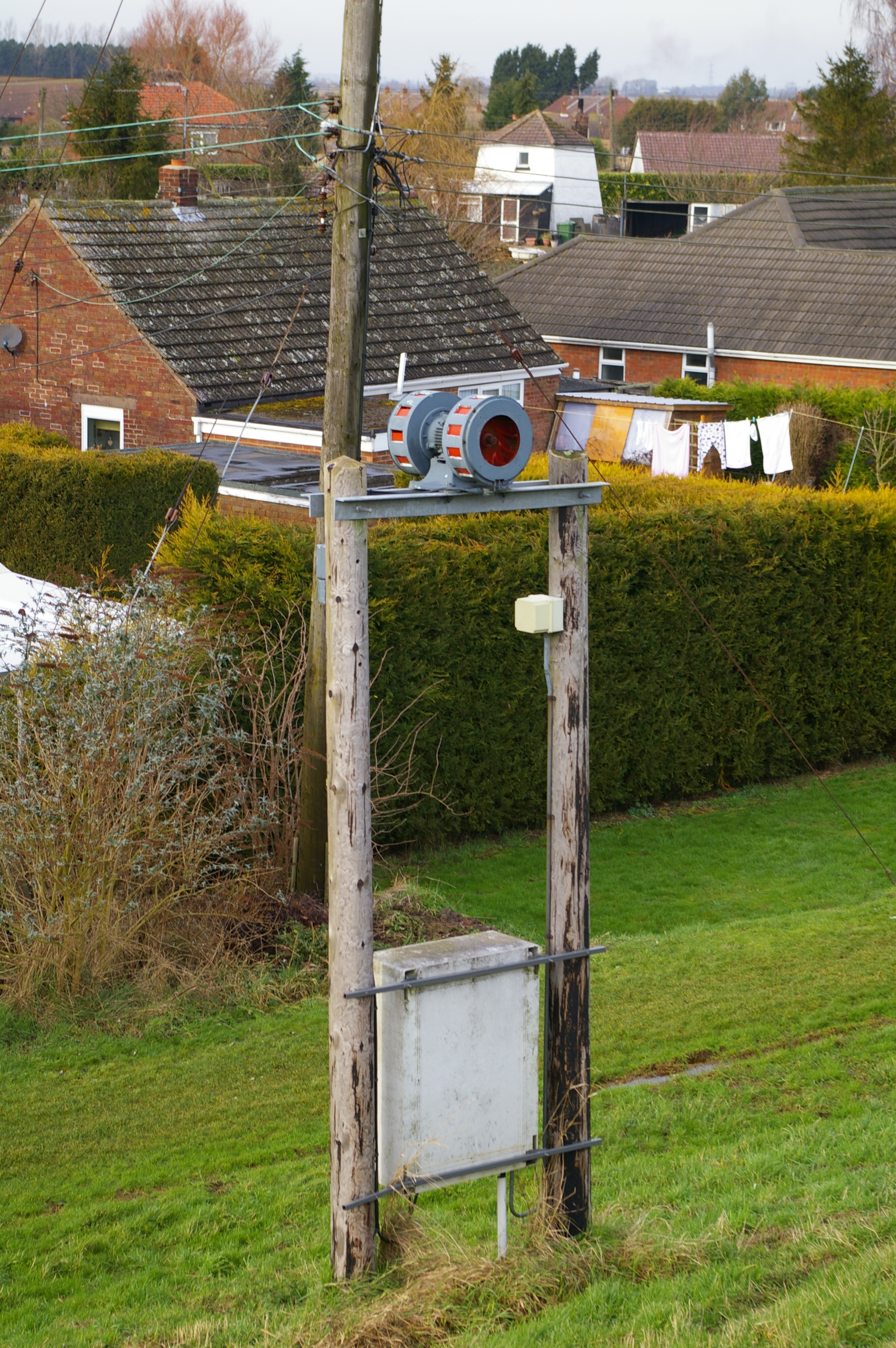
Flood warning sirens, like this Castle Castings one in Magdalen in Norfolk, UK, are common along the River Great Ouse, which is prone to flooding.

Lincolnshire, which had one of the largest siren systems in the country consisting of Carters, had 46 sirens based in North Somercotes, Mablethorpe, Boston, Skegness, Spalding and Sutton Bridge, as well as inland at Louth, Horncastle, Middle Rasen and Gainsborough, the areas most at risk of being hit by floods. Following serious flooding in the summer of 2007, investigations took place into how the flood warning system could be improved. The Environment Agency admitted that the warning system in Louth had not sounded early enough. In April 2008, Lincolnshire County Council began to investigate the possibility of replacing the flood warning sirens with mobile phone alerts. A council report in November 2009 described the sirens as being "outdated, in the wrong places and difficult to repair". The sirens were eventually decommissioned in November 2011 and replaced with Floodline.

In January 2010, 13 public warning sirens on the island of Guernsey that had first been installed in 1937 were due to be retired and replaced by text messages. This followed claims by the Home Department that the sirens had "reached the end of their useful working life". The sirens had previously been used to warn of major incidents. From 1950 to 2010, the Civil Defence Committee took responsibility for the sirens, and had tested them annually since 9 May 1979. Members of the public had criticised the decision, and Deputy Janine Le Sauvage claimed that sirens were the only way everyone knew there was an emergency. In February 2010, 40 islanders formed a protest march opposing the proposal to retire the sirens. The campaigners accused the government of not listening to them, as an online petition calling for the sirens to be saved was signed by more than 2,000 people. In April 2010, it was decided to dismantle the public warning system. Emergency planners had proposed to use a new warning system that would contact residents by telephone; however, this was abandoned due to technical limitations and local media and other communication methods are used instead. Only two remain in Guernsey, one in Victoria Tower, which sounded off once at around 2017, and another, active for a quarry.

Following severe flooding in Upper Calder Valley in June 2000, the Environment Agency replaced its network of sirens, with eight being placed around Walsden, Todmorden, Hebden Bridge and Mytholmroyd. The network was designed to complement the agency's Floodline service. These sirens became what is now known as the Todmorden Flood Warning System. There are nine sirens that are part of the system, five of them being Secomak, three of them being Klaxon and one of them being Carter (which was recently confirmed to be inactive according to the local environment agency).

In November 2010, 36 flood warning sirens in Essex, including nine on Canvey, were retired following concerns from the county council that the system was "no longer fit for purpose". The sirens were due to become obsolete in 2014. Only five sirens from the entire system remain, two of them in Canvey Island.

In September 2012, new flood warning sirens were installed in the Dunhills Estate in Leeds, as part of flood defence work at Wyke Beck. In January 2014, flood sirens sounded for the first time in 30 years on the Isle of Portland.

Broadmoor Hospital used 13 sirens installed in 1952, which were tested weekly. These were consisted of Secomak CS8s, which were similar to a Secomak GP8 except the CS8 had coded shutters which could do an alternating hi-lo signal, and if designed to do so, could also do a pulse signal. For emergencies, they sounded the hi-lo and for all clear, they sounded a steady tone. In tests, they would sound the all-clear. In July 2014, plans were put forward to retire seven of the thirteen alarms, which had last been properly activated in 1993. The alarms are located in areas such as Sandhurst, Wokingham, Bracknell, Camberley and Bagshot. In June 2016, the West London Mental Health Trust, who manages the hospital, proposed decommissioning the sirens altogether and replacing them with social media alerts through websites such as Twitter. In December 2019, this entire system was decommissioned, in favour of a new Electronic siren located at the hospital. This siren is tested silently; however, on occasion (with prior notice from the hospital) it is audibly tested, but not at full volume.

A similar siren system in Carstairs, Scotland, called the Carstairs Hospital Siren System, uses nine sirens, seven of them being Secomak CS8, one being a Klaxon GP8 and one being Secomak GP12. The hi-lo signal is rarely used since during emergencies they sound a continuous tone for eight minutes, and in all clear they sound a long wail, consisting of thirty seconds of startup and alert and a thirty-second wind-down, three times. The test schedule is the third Thursday of every month at 1 PM with the all clear.

There are several sirens in use around Avonmouth near Bristol to warn of chemical incidents from industry in the area. These are known as the Severnside Sirens. These sirens consist of Federal Signal Modulators and two DSAs, which were installed in 1997 for the public. The system is tested every third day of every month at 3 PM. This consists of rising tones and a steady pulsing tone, followed by a steady tone for all clear. In emergencies, they will run for as long as the batteries can allow since they are off-grid powered.

=== North America ===
==== Canada ====
In Canada, a nationwide network of Canadian Line Materials sirens was established in the 1950s to warn urban populations of a possible Soviet nuclear attack. This system was tested nationwide twice in 1961, under the codenames Exercise Tocsin and Tocsin B. The system was maintained until the 1970s, when advancements in military technology reduced the Soviet nuclear missile strike time from 3–5 hours to less than 15 minutes. Sirens can still be found in many Canadian cities, all in various states of repair. In Toronto, for instance, the network has been abandoned to the point where no level of government will take responsibility for its ownership. A handful of sirens still remain in Toronto in older established neighbourhoods:

- Dundas Street West and Shaw Street
- York Quay, Harbourfront

Sirens have recently been built within three kilometers (two miles) of the Darlington and Pickering nuclear power plants in the province of Ontario. (Both plants are within 30 kilometers; 20 miles of each other.) These sirens will sound in the event of a nuclear emergency that could result in a release of radioactivity. Sirens have also been placed (and are tested weekly) in Sarnia, Ontario due to the large number of chemical plants in the vicinity. These consist mainly of ATI HPSS32 sirens, as well as a Federal Signal Modulator in the rail yards and three Thunderbolt 1003s located at the Suncor plant. Sirens have also been installed in and around the Grey Bruce Nuclear Generating Station. The sirens are on the plant and in the surrounding communities such as Tiverton, Ontario. One notable siren is a Federal Signal Modulator at the Bruce Nuclear Visitor's Centre. The Public Siren network as it is called, consists of mostly Whelens, Modulators, and Model 2s. One of the sirens in this network (a Model 2) is at Tiverton, which is about 10 km (6 miles) from the plant.

Many warning sirens in Ontario, Manitoba, Saskatchewan and Alberta are now used as tornado warning instruments. Smithers, British Columbia uses an old air raid siren as a noon-day whistle. New Waterford, Nova Scotia uses a siren to signal the daily curfew. One of the warning sirens was even used as a goal horn for the Quebec Nordiques between the mid-1980s and 1991. Caledonia, Ontario routinely uses an air raid siren to call in their local volunteer firefighters to the fire hall. Weather radios in Canada are often used for advance warnings about future severe storms whenever people are at home, at a business or in a car.

==== United States ====
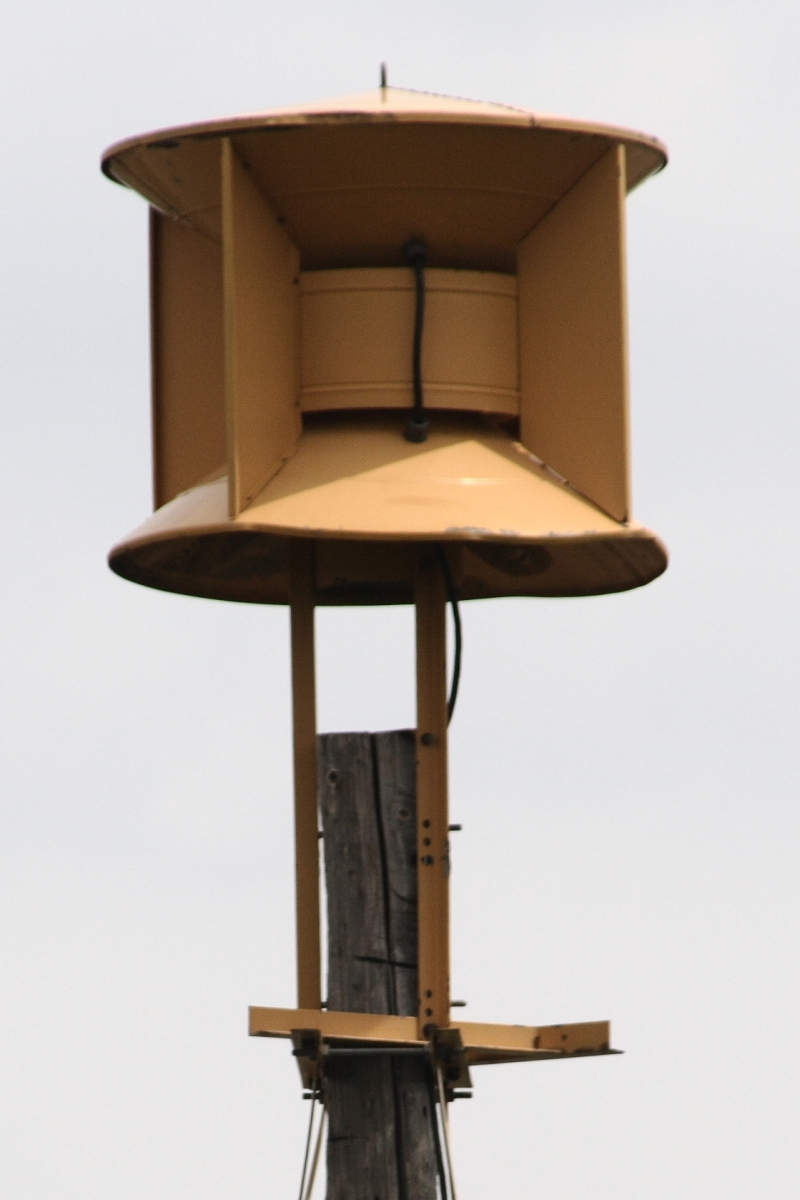
Federal Signal Model SD-10

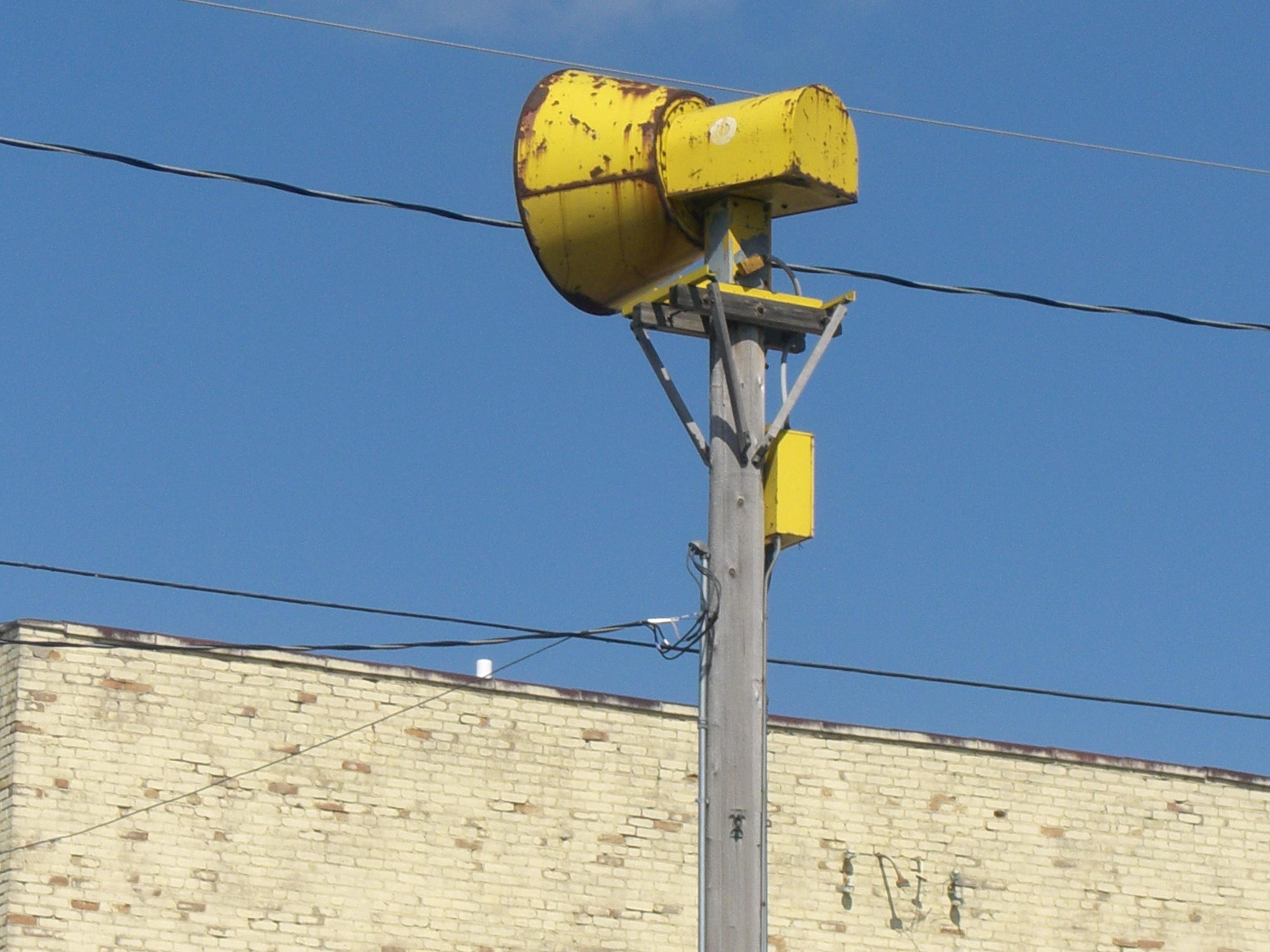
Federal Signal Model 500AT

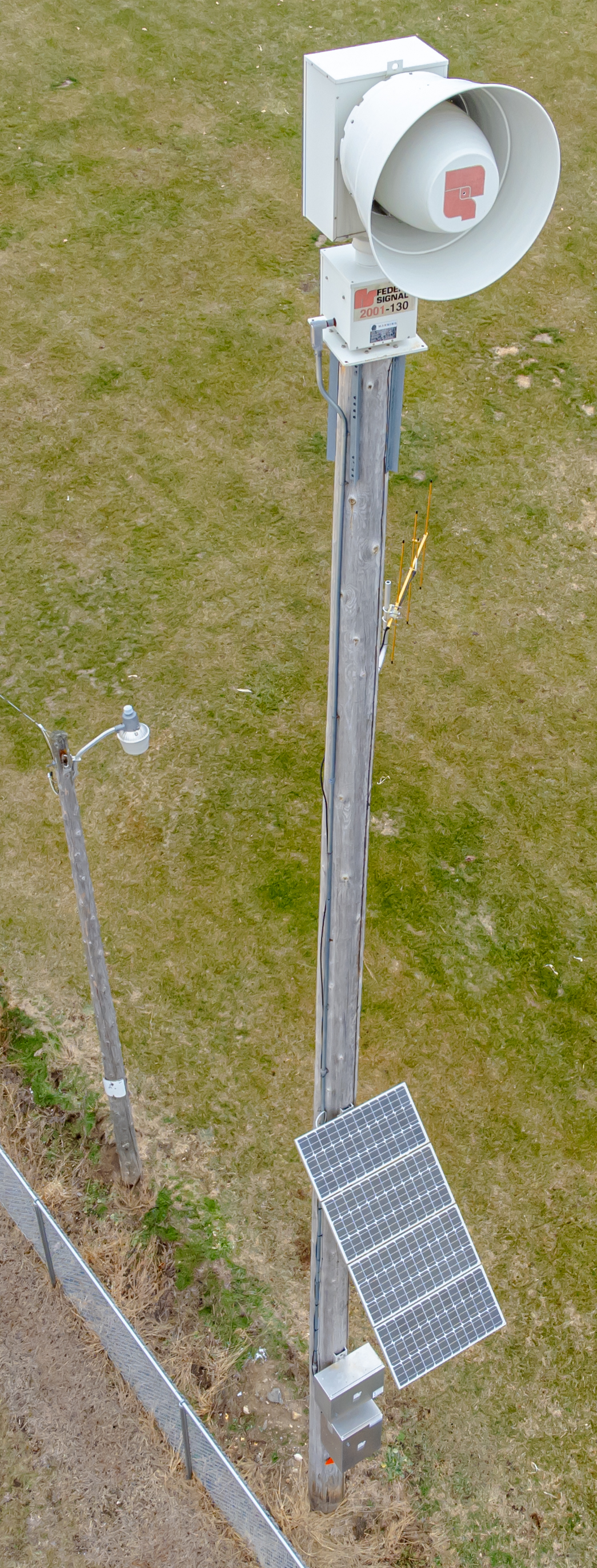
Federal Signal Model 2001

In the United States, several sets of warning tones have been used that have varied due to age, government structure, and manufacturer. The initial alerts used during World War II were the alert signal (a 3–5-minute steady, continuous siren tone) and the attack signal (a 3–5-minute warbling tone, or series of short tone bursts on devices incapable of warbling, such as whistles). The Victory Siren manual stated that when a manual generation of the warbling tone was required, it could be achieved by holding the Signal switch on for eight seconds and off for four seconds. In 1950, the Federal Civil Defense Administration revised the signals, naming the alert signal red alert and adding an all clear signal, characterized by three one-minute steady blasts with two minutes of silence between the blasts.

Beginning in 1952, the Bell and Lights Air Raid Warning System, developed by AT&T, was made available to provide automated transmission of an expanded set of alert signals:

- Red alert: Attack imminent
- Yellow alert: Attack likely
- White alert: All clear
- Blue alert: High–low (Different warning, such as a local warning)

The yellow alert and red alert signals correspond to the earlier alert signal and attack signal, respectively, and the early Federal Signal AR timer siren control units featured the take cover button labeled with a red background and the alert button labeled with a yellow background. Later AF timers changed the color-coding, coloring the alert button blue, the take cover button yellow, and the fire button red (used to call out volunteer firefighters), thus confusing the color-coding of the alerts. In 1955, the Federal Civil Defense Administration again revised the warning signals, altering them to deal with concern over nuclear fallout. The new set of signals were the alert signal (unchanged) and the take cover signal (previously the attack signal). The all clear signal was removed because leaving a shelter while fallout was present would prove hazardous.

Sirens began to replace bells for municipal warning in the early 1900s, but became commonplace following America's entry into World War II. Most siren models of this time were single-tone models which often sounded almost an octave higher in pitch than their European counterparts. Dual-tone sirens became more common in the 1950s, but had been used in some areas since about 1915. During the Cold War, standard signals were used throughout the country for civil defense purposes, referred to as alert and attack. Volunteer fire departments generally used a different siren signal. Many towns, especially in California and New England, used coded air horns or diaphones for fire calls and reserved sirens for civil defense use.

Today, signals are determined by state and local authorities, and can vary from one region to another. The most common tones produced by sirens in the United States are alert (steady) and attack (wail). Other tones include Westminster Chimes (commonly used for the testing of electronic sirens), hi-lo (high-low), whoop, pulse (pulsing), air horn, and fast wail.

The U.S. federal standard regarding emergency warning signals is defined in FEMA's Outdoor Warning Systems Guide, CPG 1–17, published on March 1, 1980, which describes the Civil Defense Warning System (CDWS) and its warning signals. The language was slightly revised by FEMA's National Warning System Operations Manual, Manual 1550.2 published 03-30-2001:

- Attack warning: a three-to-five-minute wavering tone on sirens or a series of short blasts on horns or other devices. The attack warning signal means an actual attack or accidental missile launch was detected, and people should take protective action immediately. The signal will be repeated as often as deemed necessary by local government authorities to get the required response from the population, including taking protective action from the arrival of fallout. This signal will have no other meaning and will be used for no other purpose. (However, sometimes the attack signals are used for tornado warnings.)
- Attention or alert warning: a three-to-five-minute steady signal from sirens, horns, or other devices. Local government officials may authorize use of this signal to alert the public of peacetime emergencies, normally tornadoes, flash floods, and tsunamis. With the exception of any other meaning or requirement for action as determined by local governments, the attention or alert signal will indicate that all persons in the United States should "turn on [their] radio or television and listen for essential emergency information".
- A third distinctive signal may be used for other purposes, such as a local fire signal.
- All clear: no all clear signal is defined by either document.

External videos
- YouTube
- Chicago Tornado Siren Test

The most common tone, alert, is widely used by municipalities to warn citizens of impending severe weather, particularly tornadoes which have earmarked the sirens as tornado sirens. This practice is nearly universal in the Midwest and parts of the Deep South, where intense and fast-moving thunderstorms that can produce tornadoes occur frequently. The alert sound is a steady, continuous note. In seaside towns, alert may also be used to warn of a tsunami. Sirens that rotate will have a rising-and-falling tone as the direction of the horn changes. The attack tone is the rising and falling sound of an air raid or nuclear attack, frequently heard in war movies. It was once reserved for imminent enemy attack, but is today sometimes used to warn of severe weather, tsunamis, or even fire calls, depending on local ordinance. Criteria to sound sirens during severe weather events are established by regional National Weather Service offices and do not have an all clear signal.

There is no standard fire signal in the United States, and while the use of sirens by volunteer fire departments is still common, it is diminishing. In the dry areas of the American West, residents may be required to shut off outdoor water systems to ensure adequate pressure at fire hydrants upon hearing the signal. The fire signal can vary from one community to another. Three long blasts on a siren is one common signal, similar to the signal used by volunteer brigades in Germany and other countries, while other locales use the hi-lo (high-low) signal described above. Some communities, particularly in New England and northern California, make use of coded blasts over a diaphone or air horn for fire signals, reserving the use of sirens for more serious situations. Still others use the attack tone as their fire call. Some communities make use of an all clear signal, or sound separate signals for fire calls and ambulance runs. Some fire signals in the U.S. are often blasted at least once a day, mostly at noon, to test the system, and are often referred to as noon sirens or noon whistles. These also function as a time tick for setting clocks.

CPG 1-17 recommends that a monthly test be conducted, consisting of the steady attention signal for no more than one minute, one minute of silence, and the attack signal for no more than one minute. A growl test signal is also described by CPG 1–17, when a siren must be tested more than once a month. This is typically a one-second burst of sound to verify the proper operation of the siren without causing a significant number of people to interpret the test as an actual alert. Many cities in the U.S. periodically sound their sirens as a test, either weekly, monthly, or yearly, at a day and hour set by each individual city.

In the United States, there is no national level alert system. Normally, sirens are controlled on a county or local level, but some are controlled on a state level, such as in Hawaii. Sirens are usually used to warn of impending natural disaster; while they are also used to warn of threats of military attacks, these rarely occur in the United States. Throughout the Great Plains, Midwest, and South, they are typically used to warn the public to take cover when a tornado warning is issued, sometimes even for severe thunderstorm warnings, and very rarely used for anything else. They are generally required in areas within a ten-mile radius of nuclear power plants. In the South and on the East Coast (except for Texas, Maine, Florida and New Hampshire), sirens are used to inform people about approaching hurricanes.

In Pierce County, Washington there is a system of sirens set up along the Puyallup and Carbon River valleys to warn residents of volcanic eruptions and lahars (giant mudslides) from Mt. Rainier.

Coastal communities, especially those in northern California, Oregon, Washington, Alaska, and Hawaii, use siren systems to warn of incoming tsunamis. In 2011, the city of Honolulu created an Adopt-a-Siren website for its tsunami sirens. The site is modeled after Code for America's Adopt-a-Hydrant, which helps volunteers in Boston sign up to shovel out fire hydrants after storms.

Some U.S. volunteer fire departments, particularly in rural areas, use sirens to call volunteers to assemble at the firehouse. This method is being used less frequently as technology advances and local residents within earshot often file complaints with their town boards. Some areas utilize their sirens as a last resort, relying more on cellular and paging technology; however, a decreasing number of rural departments are still outside the range of wireless communications and rely on sirens to activate the local volunteer departments.

Many college campuses in the U.S., especially in the wake of the Virginia Tech shooting, have begun installing sirens to warn students in the event of dangerous incidents. Sirens in the United States have been replaced by NOAA Weather Radios for advance warnings about future severe storms whenever people are inside cars or buildings.

=== South America ===
Argentina

Around mainly suburban areas of big cities like Bahia Blanca, Mar De Plata, Rosario, Cordoba and Comodoro Rivadavia, in police stations, fire stations, factories, weather stations, city halls and amongst common public neighbourhoods, warning sirens can be found. Most of the common models are a special model which isn't completely identified yet as of now, which however, looks like a vertical Klaxon GP6/10, a Mechtric MS22 or a vertically installed mechanical or electro-mechanical eight-, nine-, eleven-, or twelve-port single-tone siren, most of which have six rectangular horns and are most often identified as a Kingvox. They sound off for terrorism attacks, bushfires, dam leakages, chemical plant issues, life-threatening/extremely severe weather alerts which are certain to happen, incoming enemy attack and any other common natural disasters. Other models present in the country's warning system include Federal Signal, Elektror/Siemens, Whelen, Telegrafia, Klaxon and Hörmann. In extremely urban areas like Buenos Aires, most of the mechanical sirens which used to operate in a large amount were decommissioned and replaced with a smaller amount of electronic sirens, SMS alerts to phones and in some cases, as EAS alerts to TV. In some areas around the suburban areas of the big cities, over the years and since the 2010s, some sirens were decommissioned due to maintenance upkeep even though most of them remain active.

Two signals are commonly used. Here are the signals:

- General warning: Thirteen-second wind-up and alert with a six-second wind-down, which repeats three times. This signal is used if a public emergency is imminent.
- All clear: A 100-second alert to be used after a public emergency has been dealt with.

The all clear signal is mainly used during the nationwide siren testing in Argentine Volunteer Firefighters' Day on 2 June, and sometimes, in some sirens, the general warning is tested after the all-clear.

=== Oceania ===
==== Australia ====
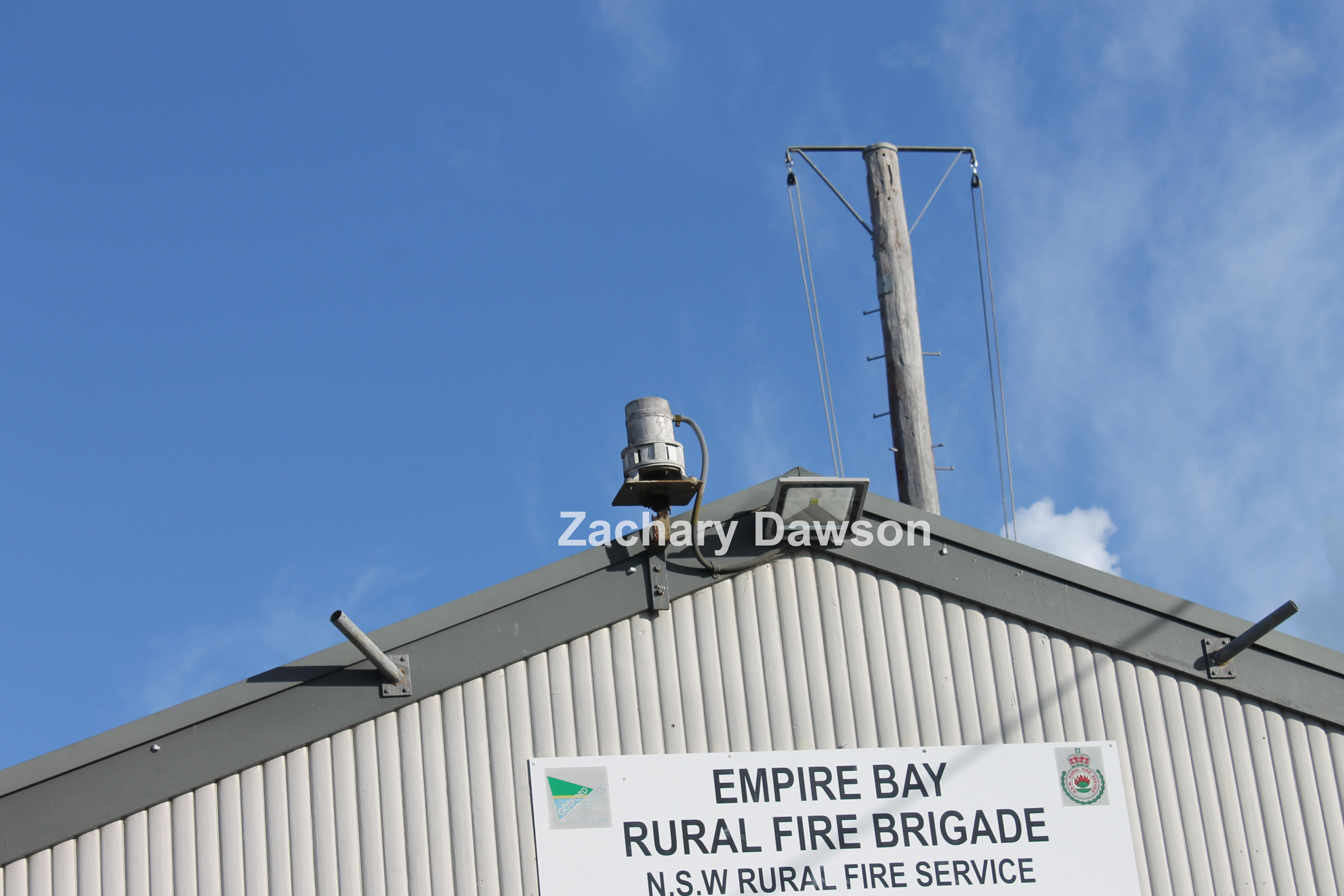
A Shroudless Federal Signal STL-10 Siren at Empire Bay Rural Fire Station

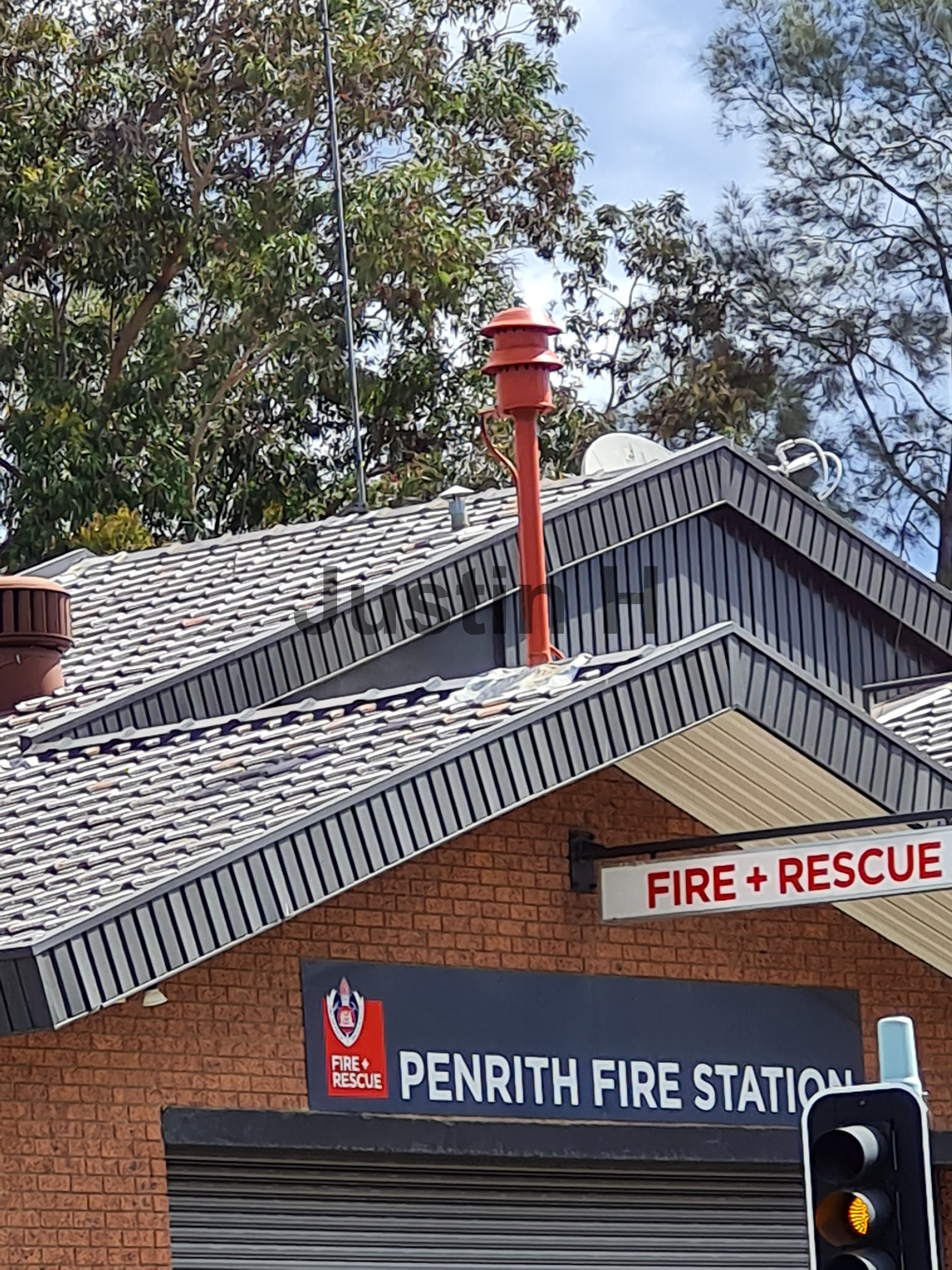
A Grifco 888 Siren at Penrith Fire Station, New South Wales, Australia

A series of 98 electronic sirens, making up a large-scale public-address system (the Sydney CBD Emergency Warning System) and including thirteen variable-message signs, are installed in the Sydney central business district. While installed in the months preceding the 2007 APEC conference, they are designed to be a permanent fixture and are tested on a monthly basis.

Some large-scale sirens are also deployed, like the Grifco Model 888, Grifco Model 777, and Klaxon SO4, which are used at fire stations for call-outs and at Sydney's beaches for shark alarms. Alarms are also used around prisons for breakouts and at many factories and schools to announce start and finish times.

A siren is located at the Kwinana BP plant south of Perth; this siren is tested every Monday. It is used to evacuate the plant in case of an emergency and can be heard in Kwinana and certain parts of Rockingham. It can also be used to warn of severe weather and potentially dangerous emergencies on the Kwinana Industrial Strip.

In South Australia, a number of Country Fire Service stations have sirens on or near the stations. These are only activated when the brigade are responding to bushfire or grassfire events and for testing. They are not activated for every call, only as a public alert for the presence of bushfires.

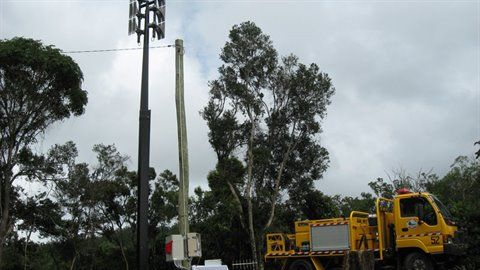
This electronic siren is to warn the communities of bushfire and fire callout. They are being set up at the mountains of Queensland, Australia.

There are electronic sirens that include Whelen, Telegrafia, SiRcom, Klaxon and Grifco.

In Victoria, many Country Fire Authority stations have sirens installed that are used to summon volunteers to an emergency callout, as well as consequently alerting the local community of brigade activity. Due to a variety of siren models in use across the state, there are two signals that are used, differentiated by length:

- Emergency callout: Siren sounds for no longer than 90 seconds.
- Community alert: Siren sounds for no less than five minutes.

In Melbourne's CBD, there is a set of sirens installed to warn of attack and extreme flooding. These became necessary after the Bourke and Flinders St. attacks, where people were killed as a result of a person intentionally driving a vehicle into pedestrians.

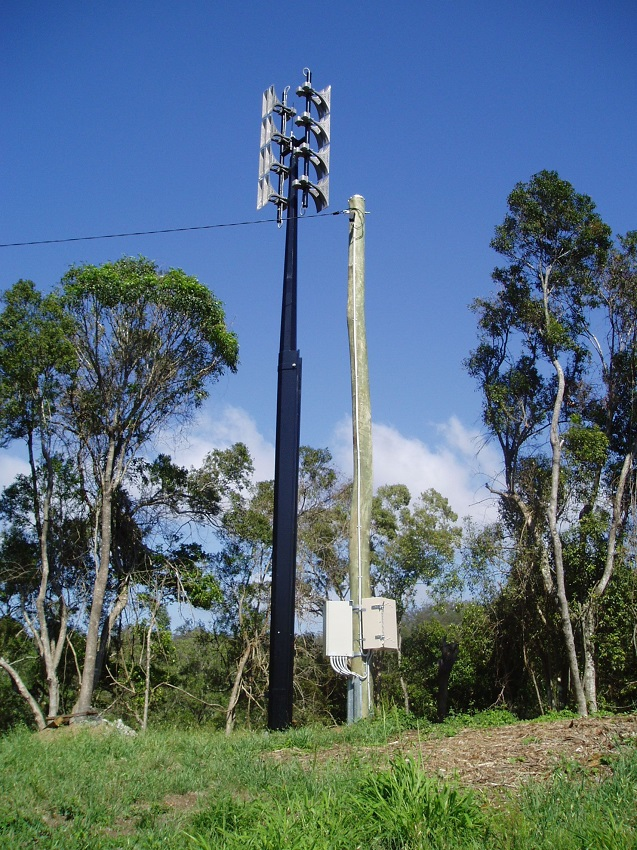
Bushfire warning sirens in Mount glorious, Queensland, Australia

In Queensland, Whelen Vortex-R4 sirens have been installed as part of the Somerset Regional Council Flood Warning System. At nearby Grantham, Queensland, a Whelen WPS-2906, which features both warning tones and pre-recorded messages provides early warning in the event of flooding. As well, Cairns Regional Council have installed nine Whelen WPS-2900 series sirens to alert to a dam breach of the nearby Copperlode Falls Dam. A map of the system can be found here, as well as additional information. Other Whelen WPS-2900 series sirens can be found in a few towns around Queensland as well.

==== New Zealand ====
Lower Hutt, Napier, Whanganui, and the former Waitakere City (now Waitakere Ranges) of Auckland each have a network of civil defense sirens. The networks in Lower Hutt and Napier are bolstered by fire sirens that also function as civil defense sirens. Lower Hutt's network is further bolstered by selected industrial sirens that double as civil defence sirens. In the western Bay of Plenty Region, several fire sirens also serve as civil defense sirens, and there are dedicated civil defense sirens at the Bay Park Raceway in Mount Maunganui, Tokoroa, and Whangamatā (which has two). Additionally, Tokoroa, Putāruru, Tīrau, and Whangamatā have fire sirens serving double duty as civil defense sirens. In the years following the tsunamis of the Indian Ocean earthquake in 2004, Meerkat electronic sirens were installed in all populated areas of the west coast lower than 10 metres.

Warning sounds vary from area to area, including rising and falling notes and Morse code sirens. Communities with volunteer fire brigades use a continuous note on all sirens for civil defense, and a warbling siren on the fire station siren only for fire callouts. Civil defense uses a distinctive "sting" siren that is used by all radio stations nationwide, but is currently only used for civil defense sirens in Wanganui.

=== Africa ===
==== Morocco ====
Morocco, like many other countries, has civil defense sirens installed in several cities and towns such as Casablanca, Oujda, Asilah, M'diq, Chefchaouen, and Qalaat Sraghna. However, not all cities are equipped with this system. These sirens are typically located at fire stations and city halls. They were first introduced during the French and Spanish colonial era, and while some have been dismantled, many continue to operate to this day. These sirens are strategically positioned in areas with high population densities like Casablanca, or in regions that are susceptible to natural disasters like floods, such as the Eureka siren. Additionally, they can also be found in tourist areas such as M'Diq and Chefchaouen, as well as in areas where dangerous industries are located. Although these sirens are seldom used due to the rarity of imminent danger, they were recently utilized during the quarantine period of the pandemic. Sirens sounded in various cities, including Oujda, to alert the population of the nightly curfew. During the holy month of Ramadan, these sirens are employed to signal the arrival of the Fotour time. In the past, these sirens were used in small towns to call for volunteer paramedics in emergencies such as fires or drowning incidents. However, in cities without sirens, the state utilizes alternative means to alert the public, such as broadcasting warning messages on television or radio, or sending SMS messages to citizens' phone numbers. In dangerous situations, police patrol car horns are also used to warn the public. Surprisingly, the state does not allocate any specific days to test the sirens, and the reasons behind this remain unknown.

== See also ==
- List of civil defense sirens
- Emergency Alert System
- Fire alarm system
- Long Range Acoustic Device
- Rotary woofer
