= Forest Park (Kansas City, Missouri) =

Defunct amusement park in Kansas City, Missouri

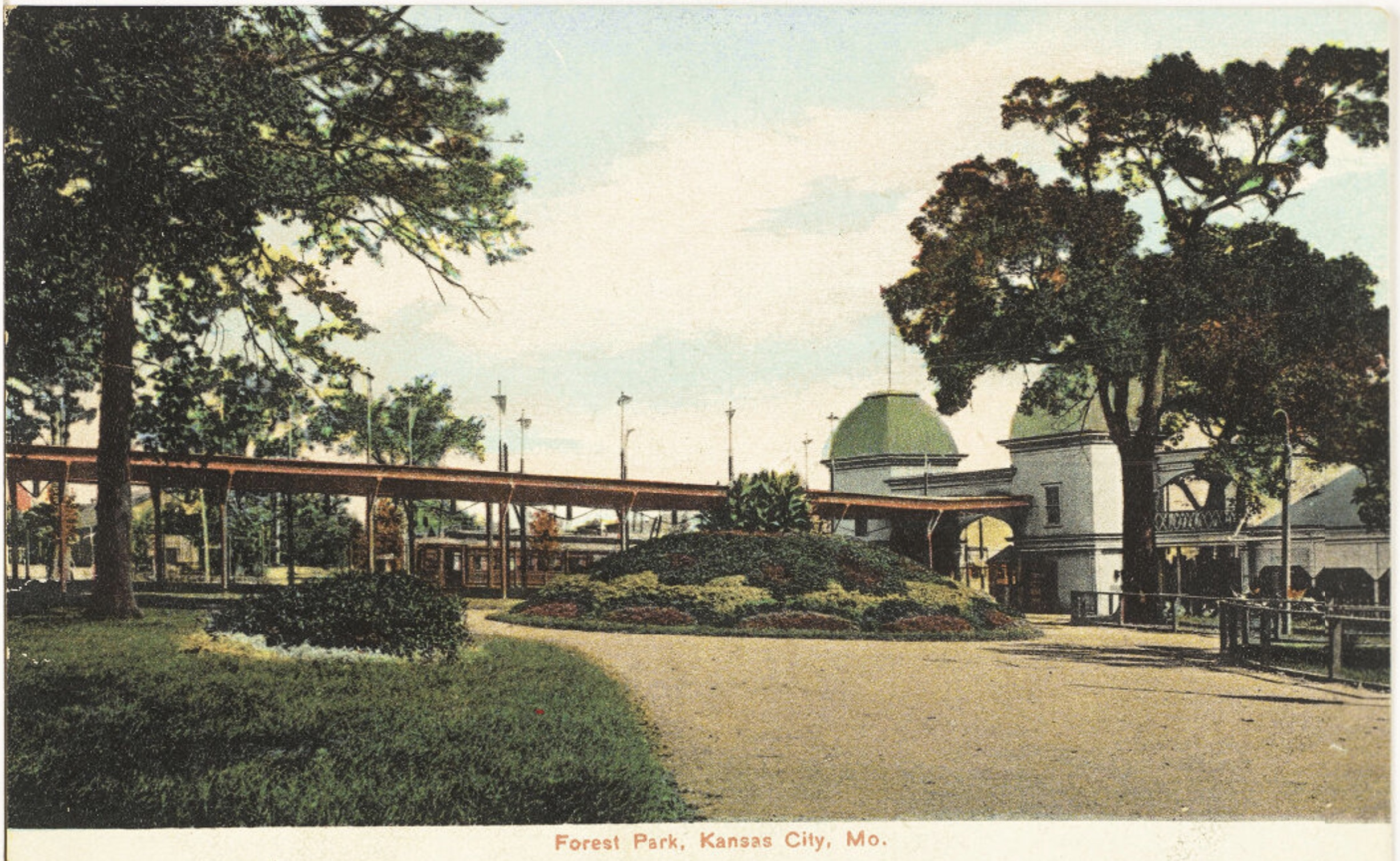
- Forest Park operated 1903-1912, with the entrance, the domed gatehouse, and the covered streetcar terminus platform.
- Interactive map of Forest Park
- Location: Independence & Hardesty Avenues, Kansas City, Missouri
- Coordinates: 39.1052°N 94.5228°W
- Status: Defunct
- Opened: June 14, 1903; 123 years ago
- Closed: 1912
- Owner: John D. Hopkins (park); Collins family (land)
- Area: 10 acres (4.0 ha)

Forest Park was a privately owned 10-acre (4.0 ha) amusement park in Kansas City, Missouri, that operated from 1903 to 1912. It was located at the southwest corner of Independence and Hardesty Avenues in the city's Northeast area. It occupied what became a six-block area of the Lykins neighborhood within Historic Northeast. This definitive trolley park was strategically situated to increase off-peak fares at the eastern terminus of the Independence Avenue streetcar line.

Forest Park was designed and owned by Colonel John D. Hopkins, inspired by his successful Forest Park Highlands in St. Louis, and fortified with some attractions he bought from the 1904 World's Fair held at Forest Park in St. Louis. It had a wide array of modern mechanical rides, live entertainment, and themed attractions. The park was marketed as a respectable, family-friendly destination, featuring a dress code and a "beerless" German Village to avoid the saloons associated with competing parks and in response to neighborhood protest against alcohol. It opened during a period of unprecedented population growth and economic expansion in Kansas City, capitalizing on a new urban market for mass leisure.

During its decade, Forest Park competed intensely with several other area amusement parks. It eventually added a beer garden, especially to compete with the more lavish and more alcohol-friendly Electric Park at the nearby Heim brewery in East Bottoms. After irreversible decline and the end of its 10-year land lease, its final season in 1912 held the controversial Jackson County Negro Fair, which sparked a racially motivated legal backlash from the surrounding white community. All of the park's assets were sold for only $5,000 (equivalent to $167,000 in 2025). Forest Park's closure reportedly ended a piece of neighborhood culture.

== Overview ==
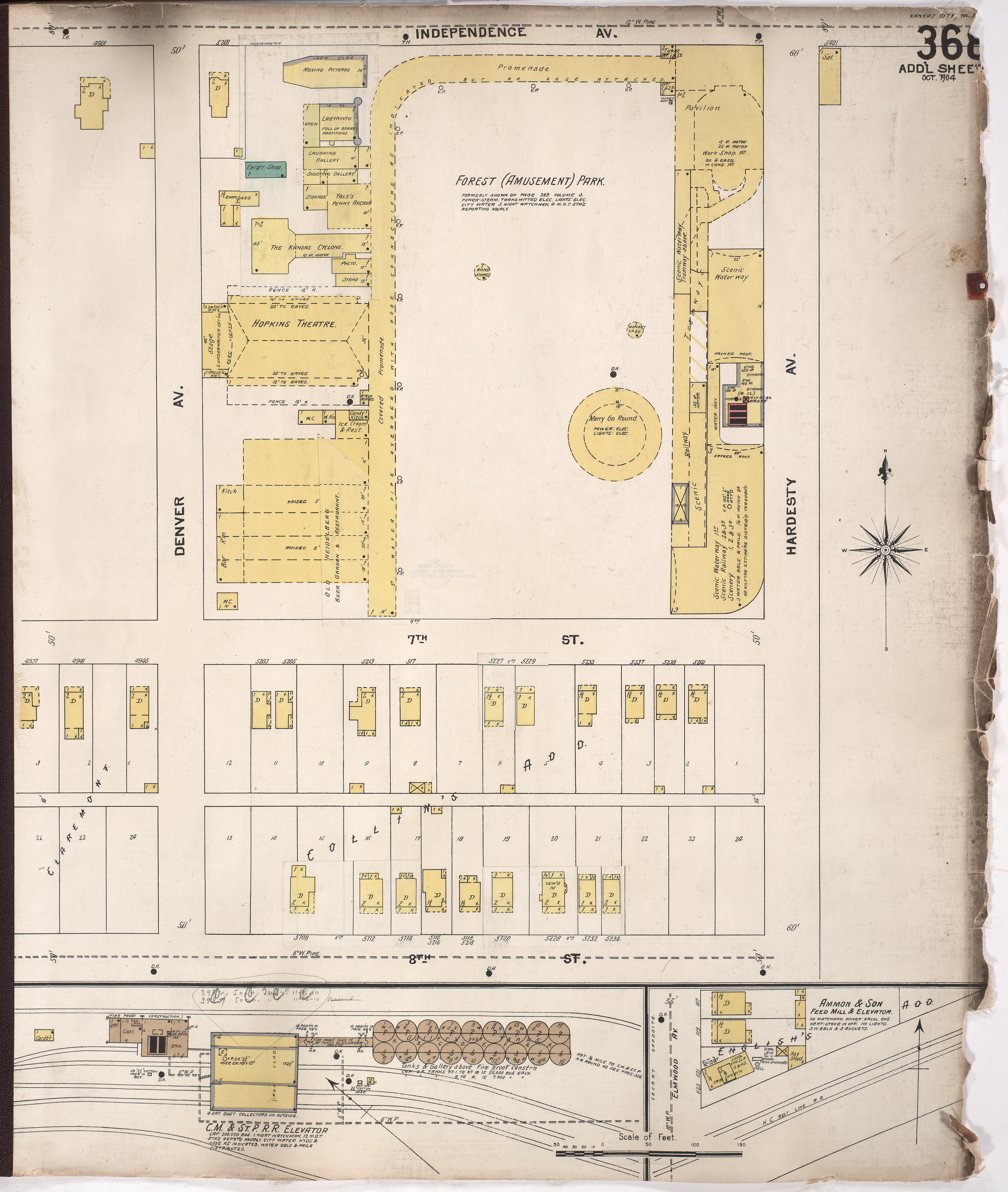
This is the full layout map of Forest Park, published 1904.

Forest Park was a trolley park at the eastern terminus of the Independence Avenue cable car line, depositing crowds directly at the gate, which was a great wooden archway illuminated by incandescent bulbs. It was at the corner of Independence Avenue and Hardesty Avenue, occupying a 10-acre (4.0 ha) grove of native oak and walnut trees leased from the farm of the late Michael Collins (established 1838). The park was a natural and shaded setting filled with modern technological spectacle. The visual centerpiece and the area's tallest structure was a massive white roller coaster, and a miniature railway nearly 1 mile (1.6 km) long transported guests around the property. More than 30,000 electric bulbs outlined the buildings, rides, and walkways, creating a brilliant illumination visible for miles as a major novelty in a largely gas-lit city.

=== Atmosphere and conduct ===
Hopkins marketed Forest Park as a "refined" destination. He enforced a strict "beerless" policy to differentiated from the rowdy beer gardens of the era, specifically the rival Electric Park located in the more industrial East Bottoms. Forest Park's peace officer patrol maintained a rigid code of conduct, and a dress code required women to wear hats and men to always wear coats and collars, even during the sweltering Missouri summers. This smart, sober, safe aesthetic was intended to attract families and a middle-class clientele.

=== Attractions ===
The park's rides followed the standard formula of the era, mixing mechanical thrills with immersive "exotic" simulations. The park's visual centerpiece was the Scenic Railway, a side-friction roller coaster that relied on gravity and momentum. A massive lattice of white-painted wood, it stood as the tallest structure in the park. Unlike modern coasters, a brakeman rode aboard to control speed as the cars navigated gentle dips and elaborate tunnels. To complement the coaster, Hopkins imported a £15,000 (equivalent to £1,580,000 in 2025) carousel from Germany. It was distinct from American models because it rotated clockwise and featured heavy, realistic horses rather than stylized figures. Others included a Laughing Gallery house of mirrors and a Cave of the Winds dark ride.

Some attractions reflected the period's fascination with catastrophe and travel. The Kansas City Cyclone (1907) was a theater building using mechanical shakers, wind effects, and sound to simulate a tornado destroying a farmhouse, replacing the earlier Indian Heaven bought from the 1904 St. Louis World's Fair. The Aquarama (1905) was an early dark ride or old mill, where boats carried passengers through a winding, indoor river channel past illuminated scenes in artificial caves. The midway featured a Penny Arcade, a Shooting Gallery, and a Funhouse often called a Katzenjammer Castle after the popular The Katzenjammer Kids comic strip.

Back To The Mines was described as an "exact reproduction of a visit to a coal mine", and another ride was themed around the contemporary construction of the Panama Canal. Smaller amusements included the Cave of the Winds, a laughing gallery, glass blowers, a pony track where children ride donkeys, a large monkey house, a flea circus, the Human Roulette Wheel, and the Squealer ride. The park had a restaurant and ample picnic grounds.

Live entertainment was central to the Forest Park experience. Several resident bands included Lenge's Military Band, a Ladies Orchestra, and a Hungarian Band. The Hopkins Theater had vaudeville acts and light opera, and was later renamed the Casino. The outdoor grounds held thrill stunts too massive for theaters, such as Dare Devil Ahern's 100-foot (30 m) high dive into a 36-inch (910 mm) deep tank of water, The Flying Dunbars aerialist troupe, and high-diving Arabian horses billed as "King and Queen". In its later years, the park staged a massive Sham Battle that reenacted the U.S. military's attack on Peking, China, during the Boxer Rebellion, complete with explosive and a full company of soldiers. The park had a reproduction of the grand cascades from the St. Louis World's Fair.

== History ==
=== Background and founding ===
Several early commercial amusement parks in the Kansas City area came from a nationwide boom in amusement park construction, boosted by an interdependency between new electric streetcar technology and destination entertainment. Kansas City's population surged 51.6% between 1900 and 1910, creating a concentrated industrial workforce and a growing middle class with disposable income. By 1919, an estimated 1,000 to 2,000 trolley parks operated across the country, making them ubiquitous to the American urban landscape.

In the early 1900s, the Metropolitan Street Railway Company sought to increase off-peak ridership on weekends and evenings. Following the national trend, the company solicited the development of a complete trolley park at the eastern terminus of its popular Independence Avenue cable car line. This guaranteed a constant and convenient flow of potential customers from across the metro, and Kansas City's fares were often as low as five cents for a 15-30 minute trip from downtown to each of several amusement parks.

In 1902, Colonel John D. Hopkins, an experienced showman who managed the Forest Park Highlands in St. Louis, bought a ten year lease on the Collins farm (settled 1834) at Independence and Hardesty Avenues in Kansas City. Hopkins designed the park as a replica of his St. Louis operation, investing US$195,000 (equivalent to about $6,987,000 in 2025) in construction.

A committee of residents objected to the planned sale of liquor on the premises due to fear of crime, and attempted to halt the project by petitioning to have a public street built directly through the property. Construction began on February 1, 1903, and the park prepared for a mid-1903 opening. Hopkins said, "I don't care if don't get a permit to sell beer. We have a nice class of people here and we'll do a big business".

The opening was delayed one week by the Great Flood of 1903, which disrupted the city's power and transit systems. Forest Park opened on Sunday, June 14, 1903, with an estimated 20,000 visitors.

=== Competition and decline ===
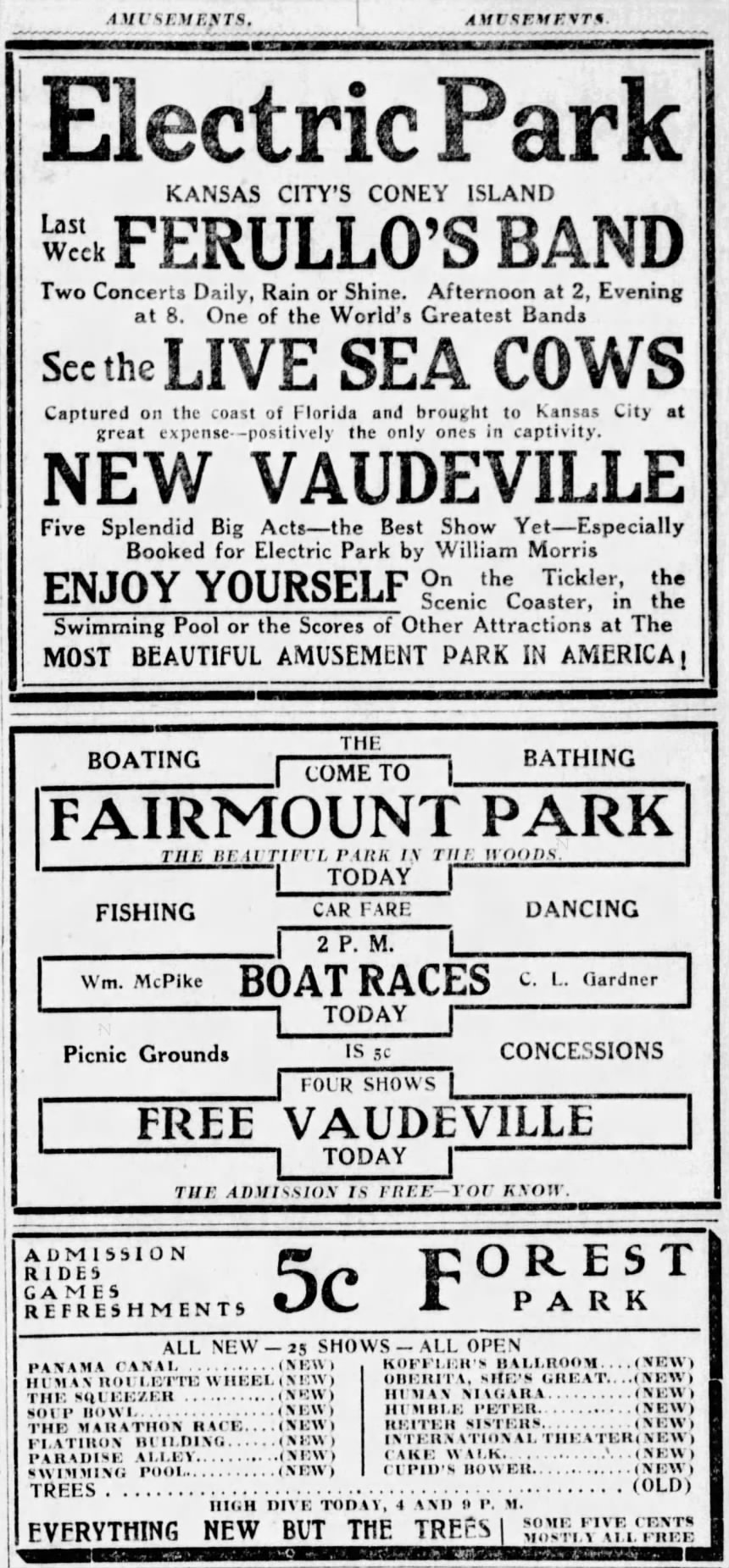
KC's main competing amusement parks were advertised on June 6, 1909, with major site-wide upgrades to Forest Park.

Admission was free for the first two years, and then cost five cents. When Forest Park opened in 1903, the first Electric Park (1899–1906) was already well established in the nearby East Bottoms. Electric Park's most popular attractions included the Mystic Chute and German Village, with the signature feature of a large German-style beer garden where beer was piped directly from the adjacent brewery, which Forest Park's "beerless" German Village could not match.

For its first four seasons, Forest Park flourished. However, in 1907, the rival Electric Park relocated to a massive new 27-acre (11 ha) site at 46th and The Paseo. The new Electric Park was advertised as "Kansas City's Coney Island", and was an immediate success due to its economically central location in the southbound expansion boom of Kansas City, its beer sales, and its larger capacity with 53,000 people on its opening day. This premier regional destination made Forest Park seem dated, remote, and inconvenient, with an irreversible decline in attendance.

The market was also saturated with other recreational options. Fairmount Park (1893–c. 1936), located in neighboring Independence and served by the Independence Air-Line Railway, was a major competitor with an 8-acre (3.2 ha) lake, a zoo, a roller rink, a mountain coaster, horse racing, and Chautauqua lectures. Troost Park was an early trolley park that the city had purchased and converted into a municipal park in 1902, the year before Forest Park opened. The market was fragmented by numerous smaller parks, such as Washington Park, Chelsea Park, and Carnival Park. The increasing availability of other urban entertainments, such as downtown theaters, further eroded Forest Park's customer base.

Hopkins responded with an aggressive expansion, installing many new attrctions including the Kansas City Cyclone simulator and a large swimming pool, and advertising "Everything new but the trees". The park struggled to maintain profitability against its "wet" competitor. By 1912, the management resorted to booking increasingly dangerous and bizarre acts to draw crowds, including the "Sham Battle" (a huge military reenactment using explosives) and the "Human Alligator" (a sideshow performer called Asthol).

In its final season in 1912, with attendance waning late in the year, the park hosted the Jackson County Negro Fair in the first week of September. The event was a financial success but illuminated the racial tensions of the period, triggering a fierce backlash from the white community. Some people organized to exclude black people from the park and petitioned the courts to revoke the park's license. The park's operators were subsequently fined for operating without a proper license. The Kansas City Times reported, "It was known the park fixtures were to be sold this fall and that negroes were considering buying the fixtures and conducting a resort for negroes only. The negroes have not entirely abandoned the idea, they say, but the promoters say that if they buy the fixtures a park will be opened across the river." Citing this opposition and declining profits, the park closed permanently after the 1912 season.

All of the park's assets were sold intact by J. H. Koffler to the Rubenstein Iron and Metal Company for only $5,000 (equivalent to $167,000 in 2025). On October 4, the Kansas City Times reported, "The purchasers will dispose of the property to owners of amusement places, and the heirs of the Collins estate, who own the land, will plat it. The park fixtures were sacrificed because the lease on the park grounds expires January 1."

The park's closure was officially attributed to a unique reason: the park's owner died, and his will forbade the property from continuing to operate as an amusement park. Anyway, the park was already financially insolvent. Its assets were sold to a scrap dealer and former park manager for only $5,000 (equivalent to about $167,000 in 2025). The merry-go-round was listed in the Kansas City Times on September 4, 1912, for $250 (equivalent to about $8,000 in 2025). The surviving members of the Collins family sold the property. They quickly platted the six-block area for redevelopment as the Forest Park subdivision, and the land was reabsorbed into the urban fabric of the growing streetcar suburb that became the Lykins neighborhood.

== Legacy ==
Forest Park was a catalyst to the eastward expansion of Kansas City and the local development of its surrounding Lykins neighborhood. Its site was platted and developed into city blocks, bounded by Independence Avenue to the north, 7th Street to the south, Hardesty Avenue to the east, and Denver Avenue to the west. Forest Park's closure reportedly ended a piece of neighborhood culture.

== See also ==
- Fairyland Park
- Worlds of Fun
- National Cloak & Suit Company, a warehouse built 1919 across Hardesty Avenue from the former Forest Park due to the intersection of freight rail and streetcar, and renovated during World War II as Hardesty Federal Complex
