= East Bottoms =

Industrial district in Kansas City, Missouri

Northeast Industrial District
- District
- Location within Missouri
- Coordinates: 39°06′38″N 94°32′45″W
- Country: United States
- State: Missouri
- County: Jackson
- City: Kansas City, Missouri
- Named for: Geographic location east of the original town in the river bottoms
- Elevation: 741 ft (226 m)

Population (2020)
  - Total: 172
- Time zone: UTC-6 (Central (CST))
  - Summer (DST): UTC-5
- ZIP Code: 64120
- Area code: 816

The East Bottoms is a historic industrial and commercial district, renamed Northeast Industrial District (NEID), in Kansas City, Missouri. It occupies a large alluvial floodplain shaped by the confluence of the Missouri River, which forms its northern border, and the Blue River, which forms its eastern border. The area is geographically isolated by high bluffs surrounding major rivers and riverbottoms, and its history is defined by cycles of settlement, destruction by flood, and engineered reinvention.

Its permanent American settlement began in 1826 as French Bottoms, a vibrant fur trader settlement of intermarried French Creole and native Osage. French Bottoms was soon completely erased from the landscape by the Great Flood of 1844, so in 1850, Kansas, Missouri, was legally incorporated to include the former French Bottoms and rename this part of it "East Bottoms". Kansas became Kansas City, with East Bottoms as its historical origin.

The riverbottoms was remade as an industrial heartland, driven by the expansion of the railroads into a hub for heavy manufacturing, breweries, and grain elevators. In the late 1800s and early 1900s, East Bottoms hosted the innovative Heim Electric Park and became a streetcar suburb. Catastrophic floods, particularly the Great Flood of 1951 and 1993, prompted a massive federal response from the U.S. Army Corps of Engineers, which encased the district in an extensive system of levees and floodwalls.

The modern rehabilitation of East Bottoms has spanned the late 20th and the 21st centuries, renaming it NEID. One century of industrial domination necessitated large-scale remediation efforts, including of significant pollution of the Blue River. Adaptive reuse of its monumental brick warehouses and factories began transforming some into popular destinations like the historically preserved J. Rieger & Co. Distillery and the Knuckleheads Saloon music venue, and restoring some identity as a cultural and entertainment spot. That residential enclave of a few hundred people and retail destination are dwarfed within NEID's vast landscape of factories, warehouses, public utility plants, railroads, and rivers.

== Demographics ==
The area historically known as East Bottoms is now administratively designated by the city as the Northeast Industrial District (NEID). The name "East Bottoms" remains common for people and maps as a very small area of NEID. The New Paseo Bridge is generally considered its western boundary, separating it from River Market and Berkeley Riverfront. The district is bounded by the Missouri River to the north, the Blue River to the east, and the steep bluffs of Kessler Park and the Historic Northeast district to the south.

According to a 2007 report by the Kansas City Planning & Development Department, East Bottoms had a population of 180 as of the 2000 Census. The area's racial composition was 61% White, 31% Black or African American, and 8% other races. It contained 85 housing units, with a 91% occupancy rate.

East Bottoms corresponds geographically to the single ZIP Code Tabulation Area (ZCTA) 64120, which is used by the U.S. Census Bureau for demographic statistics. Due to the ZCTA's predominantly commercial and industrial nature, its residential population is very low and demographic figures may be subject to a high margin of error compared to standard residential neighborhoods.

In the 2020 reporting period, the racial composition of the ZCTA 64120 population was an estimated 65.1% White and 32.0% Black or African American.

The US Census treats Hispanic/Latino as an ethnic category. This table excludes Latinos from the racial categories and assigns them to a separate category. Hispanics/Latinos may be of any race, and NH means Non-Hispanic. Population counts from 1970–1990 are for Census Tract 26 and lack a racial breakdown. Counts and racial composition from 2000–2020 are for ZCTA 64120.

East Bottoms Population and Racial Composition (1970–2020)
Race / Ethnicity	Pop 1970	Pop 1980	Pop 1990	Pop 2000	% 2000	Pop 2010	% 2010	Pop 2020	% 2020
White alone (NH)				104	57.78%	197	62.54%	105	61.05%
Black or African American alone (NH)				69	38.33%	96	30.48%	55	31.98%
Native American or Alaska Native alone (NH)				1	0.56%	2	0.63%	1	0.58%
Asian alone (NH)				0	0.00%	1	0.32%	0	0.00%
Pacific Islander alone (NH)				0	0.00%	0	0.00%	0	0.00%
Other race alone (NH)				0	0.00%	0	0.00%	1	0.58%
Mixed race or Multiracial (NH)				1	0.56%	6	1.90%	6	3.49%
Hispanic or Latino (any race)				5	2.78%	13	4.13%	4	2.33%
Total	863	431	445	180	100.00%	315	100.00%	172	100.00%

The NEID contains one of the largest industrial and commercial areas within the city limits of Kansas City, Missouri, and is defined by its heavy industrial use and infrastructure. Having historically been claimed by industry and transportation due to its favorable location near the river for river freight and rail lines, much of the land is dedicated to warehousing, manufacturing, and railroad. The Kansas City metropolitan area is the second-largest rail freight hub in the United States, and the NEID is served by the Kansas City Terminal Railway (KCT).

== History ==
=== Geology and early inhabitants ===
The geology of the East Bottoms is the foundation of its history, creating both the draw for settlement and its inherent risk. The region's bedrock was reshaped during the Pleistocene epoch by continental glaciers that carved the modern channel of the Missouri River and created its "great bend" at the confluence with the Kansas River. As the glaciers retreated, their meltwater deposited enormous volumes of sand, silt, and clay, creating the vast, flat, and fertile alluvial floodplain known as the "bottoms". However, this land was also inherently highly susceptible to flooding.

The strategic land at the confluence around Kaw Point was a center for human activity for centuries before European arrival. From around 100 BCE to 700 CE, the area was the westernmost extent of the Hopewell tradition. By the 18th century, the dominant regional power was the Osage Nation, who controlled the riverways and became vital trade partners for French fur traders. The Osage were compelled to cede their claims to the land in the Treaty of 1825, which was the legal prerequisite for permanent Euro-American settlement south of the Missouri River.

The history of the East Bottoms is a multi-generational dialogue between human ambition and the raw power of nature. No force has shaped the district's physical landscape and economic trajectory more profoundly than the recurring floods of the Missouri River. Each major flood served as a devastating reminder of the floodplain's inherent vulnerability, but also as a catalyst for an escalating series of engineering responses.

=== Chez les Cansès became Kansas, Missouri ===
The first truly permanent European-American settlement in the area was a French Creole outpost named Chez les Cansès (lit. at the place of the Kanza), including French Bottoms. After his temporary nearby posts since 1821, this was founded in 1826 by François and Bérénice Chouteau as a fur trading hub for the American Fur Company. This French-speaking community had a distinct identity, centered on communal life, agriculture, and trade. The settlement was built on the precarious floodplain and was completely obliterated by the Great Flood of 1844, which scoured every home and farm from the landscape.

The cataclysmic flood reset the region's geography. Survivors, led by the widowed Bérénice Chouteau, permanently abandoned the obliterated French Bottoms and relocated to the village on the high bluffs, which was centered around the surviving Catholic church and the Chouteau family's warehouse. This move ensured their survival and concentrated their influence, strengthening the village of Kansas which became a town in 1850. When the founders of the legally incorporated Kansas renamed the vast floodplain in 1850, they divided it into the West Bottoms and the much larger East Bottoms, with Chouteau's Landing serving as a foundational wharf for the new town.

=== Industrial heartland (1860s-1920s) ===
After the 1844 flood, city entrepreneurs saw the vast, flat "big bottoms" as ideal for industrial development. The East Bottoms, physically isolated by bluffs, became a distinct industrial district. Railroads were the primary catalyst for this transformation. The floodplain's flat topography was a natural transportation corridor, perfect for laying the extensive track networks that were difficult and expensive to build on the city's hilly terrain. This geographical advantage turned East Bottoms into the city's main rail artery. Major railroad companies, including the Missouri Pacific Railroad, the Kansas City Terminal Railway, and the St. Louis-San Francisco Railroad ("Frisco"), established critical lines, junctions, and repair shops throughout the district. The completion of the Hannibal Bridge in 1869—the first to span the Missouri River—was the pivotal event that connected Kansas City to national markets and established the West and East Bottoms as the city's logistical and industrial core.

In contrast to the West Bottoms, which became the center of meatpacking, the East Bottoms developed a more diverse industrial base and, for a time, a supporting working-class residential community. One of the most significant early enterprises was the Heim Brewing Company at Rochester and Montgall Avenues. To boost ridership on their new streetcar line, the Heim brothers opened the first Heim Electric Park in early June 1900. The park was severely damaged in the 1903 flood, a major factor in its relocation in 1907. The wealth generated from the Heim Brewing Company in the East Bottoms allowed the three Heim brothers and their brother-in-law to build four mansions between 1899 and 1901. These homes are on the bluffs above in the affluent Scarritt Point neighborhood of the Historic Northeast district. Other key industries included the W. S. Dickey Clay Manufacturing Company at Monroe and Nicholson Avenues, which produced vital clay sewer pipes for the growing city, and the Abner Hood Chemical Company at 507 N. Montgall Avenue. The district's landscape was dotted with other businesses, such as the Norris Grain Company and the Burdett Manufacturing Company.

During the mid-20th century, a small but established residential community existed amid the industry. The neighborhood was served by the Pleasant Valley School, local grocery stores like Montiel's, and a community center at Prospect and Rochester. Before it became Knuckleheads Saloon, the building at 2715 Rochester Avenue was a railroad boarding house and, at various times, a post office and fire station. Some taverns such as "The Wheel" at Nicholson and Monroe were part of the social fabric and were known in local lore for connections to the Kansas City crime family, which influenced the whole city; in 1943, federal agents traced a large heroin stash in the East Bottoms to the former owner of a local cocktail bar.

The industrialization of the East Bottoms required a massive investment in infrastructure. For a ready water supply to the district, the city constructed a 17,000,000 US gal (64,000,000 L) reservoir in Kessler Park in 1919–1920, perched on an especially high hill upon the bluffs of Northeast Kansas City, directly overlooking the area. However, the reservoir was plagued by construction issues and began leaking almost immediately, causing landslides on Cliff Drive below and raising fears of a catastrophic failure. The leak was never fixed but the reservoir was rendered obsolete by the completion of the East Bottoms Pump Station on Nicholson Avenue by 1931. For decades, the district's untreated industrial and sanitary waste flowed directly into the Blue River. By 1920, The Kansas City Star described the river as "a stagnant little stream poisoned by sewers, sick with trash". Later studies confirmed high levels of E. coli bacteria and the insecticide chlordane.

=== Great Floods, levee, and decline (1951–1990s) ===
The Great Flood of 1951 was one the greatest natural disasters in the history of the Midwest. Following months of record-breaking rainfall, an immense storm system in mid-July caused the Kansas River to surge into the Missouri, which crested on July 14 with a peak discharge of 573,000 cu ft/s (16,200 m^{3}/s)—14 ft (4.3 m) above flood stage. The existing local levee system was overwhelmed and failed. The city's riverfront industrial districts bore the brunt; fires erupted from ruptured oil tanks in the West Bottoms, and the Kansas City Stockyards were so ravaged they never fully recovered. The inundation also crippled municipal services; the Turkey Creek pumping station, which supplied about two-thirds of the city's water, was submerged and shut down, causing water pressure to plummet across Kansas City. The flood killed 28 people in the region, displaced over 500,000, and caused enormous damages. The devastation was a direct catalyst for the U.S. Army Corps of Engineers to begin a multi-decade effort to build a comprehensive federal levee system, including the East Bottoms Unit, to protect the city's industrial heartland.

This period marked another decline of the residential community in the East Bottoms. Many families were driven away by fear of floods, combined with increasing noise and pollution from industrialization. By the late 20th century, the neighborhood had almost entirely vanished, leaving behind a landscape of mostly factories, rail yards, and warehouses.

Forty-two years later came the Great Flood of 1993, when the fortified federal levee system faced its greatest test during a slow-motion disaster caused by persistent, record-setting rainfall over several months. On July 27, 1993, the Missouri River crested at a record stage of 48.87 ft (14.90 m). This time, the upgraded levee system held, a direct legacy of the 1951 disaster. As floodwaters came within inches of the top of the floodwalls, a period of intense anxiety gripped the city. Volunteers and members of the Missouri National Guard worked around the clock, building sandbag walls and standing watch to protect against any levee breach, including in the East Bottoms. Kansas City was largely spared the catastrophic inundation that was devastating other communities along the Missouri and Mississippi rivers. The 1993 flood was a critical validation of the massive investment in flood control infrastructure, but the prolonged high water also revealed new vulnerabilities with underseepage, prompting another round of studies and improvements that continue with the modern KC Levees Program.

=== 21st-century revitalization ===
After decades of industrial domination and depopulation, the East Bottoms has experienced some cultural and economic revival surrounding its small residential area, based on the adaptive reuse of its historic industrial building stock. Much of the land is overseen by the city's Planned Industrial Expansion Authority. This revitalization is anchored by businesses like the J. Rieger & Co. Distillery, which reopened in 2014 in the renovated historic Heim Brewery bottling plant. This is a major destination, featuring tasting rooms, bars, and historical exhibits. The immediate area's identity as an entertainment hub is further strengthened by Knuckleheads Saloon, a sprawling music venue that draws large crowds. Boulevard Brewing Company announced plans in 2014 to open a large production facility in the district. The site of the original Heim Electric Park is now a city park, Heim's Electric Park Playground. This renewal is supported by the East Kansas City Urban Renewal Plan, approved in 2023 to provide tax abatements and other incentives for redevelopment. The century-long concentration of heavy industry left a significant environmental footprint, and the EPA's databases show multiple facilities in the district's ZIP code (64120) subject to regulation under the Resource Conservation and Recovery Act (RCRA). This legacy has necessitated a massive modern response, the KC Water's Smart Sewer program, which is a multi-billion dollar, 25-year infrastructure investment to reduce overflows and improve water quality.

== Legacy ==
East Bottoms holds the foundational legacy of Kansas City, having originated as Chouteau's Landing wharf in the French Bottoms settlement. After the Great Flood of 1844 destroyed the floodplain community, survivors relocated to the bluffs above, which strengthened the fledgling town of Kansas. The incorporation of Kansas in 1850 brought the formal renaming of this part of French Bottoms to East Bottoms, and Kansas grew into the modern Kansas City.
