= Lykins, Kansas City =

Neighborhood of Kansas City, Missouri

Lykins
- Neighborhood
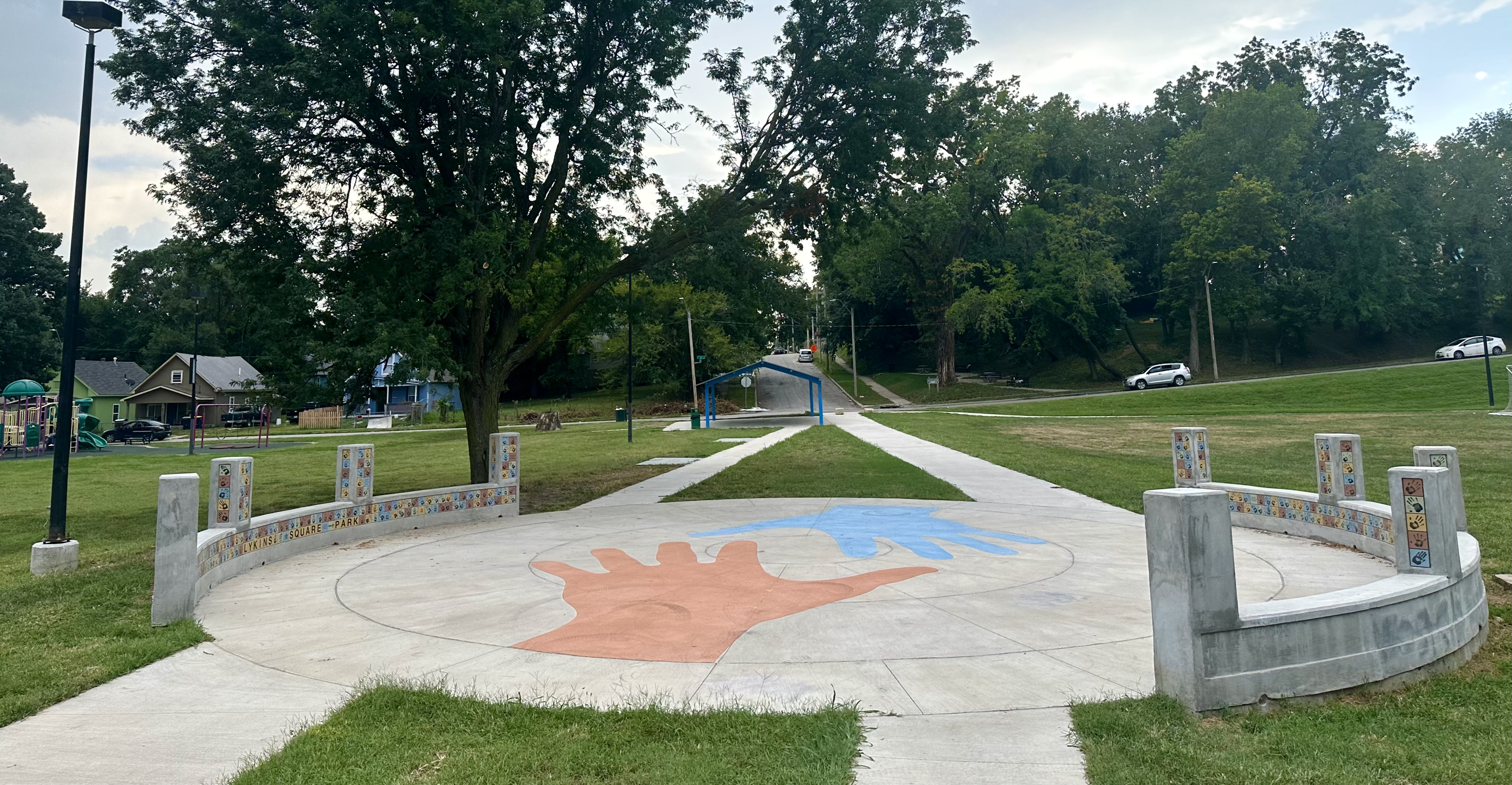
- Handprint Plaza was installed in 2024 at Lykins Square Park for neighborhood revitalization.
- Lykins neighborhood
- Coordinates: 39.102°N 94.530°W
- State: Missouri
- County: Jackson
- City: Kansas City, Missouri
- Platted: c. 1880–1910

Area
  - Total: 2.1 km^{2} (0.81 sq mi)

Population (2023)
  - Total: 4,368
  - Density: 2,100/km^{2} (5,400/sq mi)
- Website: lykinsneighborhood.com

Lykins is a neighborhood in the Historic Northeast section of Kansas City, Missouri. The land has a continuous human history of nearly two millennia, first as a major center for the Hopewell tradition around 0 CE and later as part of the vast territory of the Osage Nation since at least the 1600s. The Osage Treaty of 1825 forced the Osage Nation to cede its claims and leave. This opened the area to the territorial evolution of the United States, which led to the founding of the town of Kansas, Missouri, which became Kansas City.

As the city grew, it progressively annexed the land that would become Lykins, and the area was platted in the 1880s as a classic streetcar suburb. This early development was shaped by George Kessler's plan within the nationwide City Beautiful movement, including Lykins Square Park in the city's first Parks and Boulevards system. The Lykins School, then Lykins Square Park, and then the Lykins neighborhood, are the namesakes of Johnston Lykins, the famous missionary to the native tribes, who pioneered the wide area, cofounded Kansas City, and became its first legal mayor and a major civic booster.

In the mid-20th century, the neighborhood was part of the severe decline of the city's east side due to redlining, white flight, disinvestment, and the fragmenting construction of federal highways. In the 21st century, Lykins became a recognized exemplar of community-led revitalization, spearheaded by the Lykins Neighborhood Association in visionary partnerships with nonprofit design groups like the Hoxie Collective and Eco Abet. This includes the redevelopment of the Hardesty Federal Complex, a former World War II military depot, into a sustainable, walkable community. The neighborhood is one of Kansas City's most diverse, as a primary destination for immigrants and refugees. Diversity is in its global culture, restaurants, and schools. Over 20 languages are spoken at Whittier Elementary. According to the school, the student body at Northeast High School is exceptionally diverse, with students who speak over 50 languages and represent more than 60 countries.

== Geography ==
The neighborhood occupies a roughly triangular area defined by Independence Avenue to the north, the diagonal Kansas City Terminal Railway line to the south, Benton Boulevard to the west, and Hardesty Avenue to the east. Lykins is situated on bluffs overlooking the Missouri River floodplains, and its development is informed by the underlying geology of the region. The area's bedrock consists of thick layers of limestone and shale from the Pennsylvanian Period, which provide stable foundations for buildings and create the region's characteristic hilly terrain.

== History ==
=== Pre-colonial and indigenous history ===
The land has a continuous human history of nearly two millennia, beginning with the Kansas City Hopewell, a flourishing civilization c. 1–500 CE. Around 500 CE, the Hopewell society transformed into subsequent Late Woodland cultures.

By the 1600s, the Osage Nation was the dominant regional power after migrating west from the Ohio River Valley. They controlled a vast territory extending from the Missouri River south to the Red River. This land remained Osage territory until the United States and the Osage governments signed the Osage Treaty of 1825, which forced them to cede their claims in Missouri and move to what would become Oklahoma. The treaty expanded this region of the American frontier, opening it to the French-American pioneers François and Bérénice Chouteau.

=== Name ===
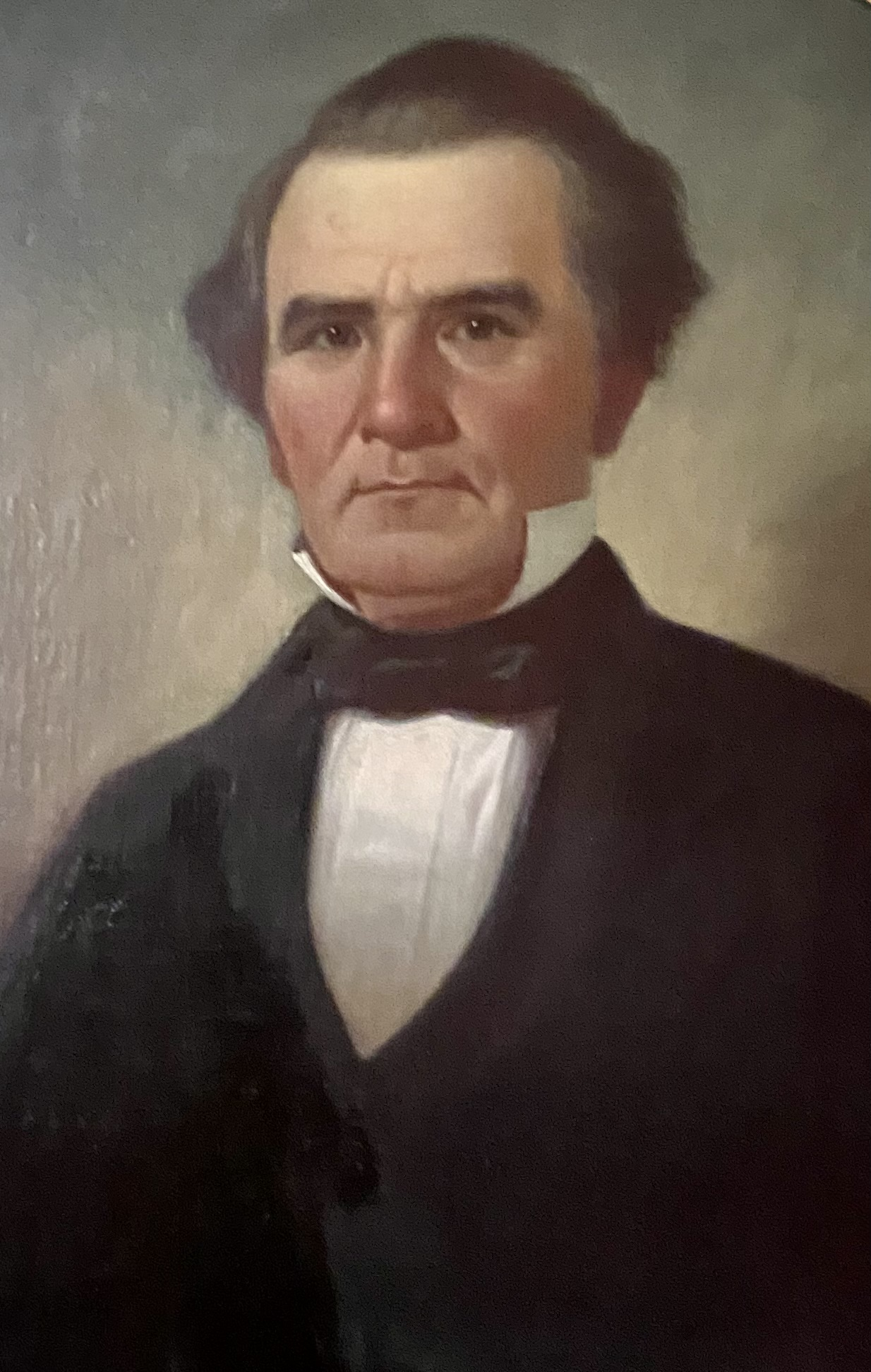
Johnston Lykins sold land to the city to become Lykins School in Quality Hill, and long after his death, another Lykins School was built in what became the Lykins neighborhood.

The neighborhood is indirectly named for Dr. Johnston Lykins (1800–1876). He was a pioneer, Baptist missionary to the tribes, pastor, school teacher, physician, one of the original 14 investors in the Town of Kansas Company in 1838, and the city's first legally elected mayor. As a leading civic booster, Lykins was staunchly opposed to land speculation. He never owned land that became this neighborhood, but the Kansas City school board recognized his city-founding efforts by naming Lykins School (1907–1933) in his posthumous honor. In 1913, the city established a neighboring park from a block of condemned houses, naming it Lykins Square after the school.

=== Founding, development, and decline ===
The Lykins School at E 7th St and Jackson Ave operated from 1907 to 1933, and was demolished. The neighboring Lykins Square Park was named after it.

Following the 1825 treaty, the area remained unincorporated county land for decades. As the town of Kansas, Missouri grew into the City of Kansas, its borders expanded. In 1885, Kansas City annexed a large swath of land that extended its eastern boundary to Cleveland Avenue, bringing half of the future Lykins area officially into the city. This annexation coincided with a major real estate boom, and the area was formally developed, subdivided into several smaller "additions" by various developers. The neighborhood thrived for decades as a classic streetcar suburb for middle and working-class families, its development driven by the expansion of the city's electric streetcar system. Its growth was further shaped by George Kessler's 1893 Parks and Boulevards System, a key part of the City Beautiful movement.

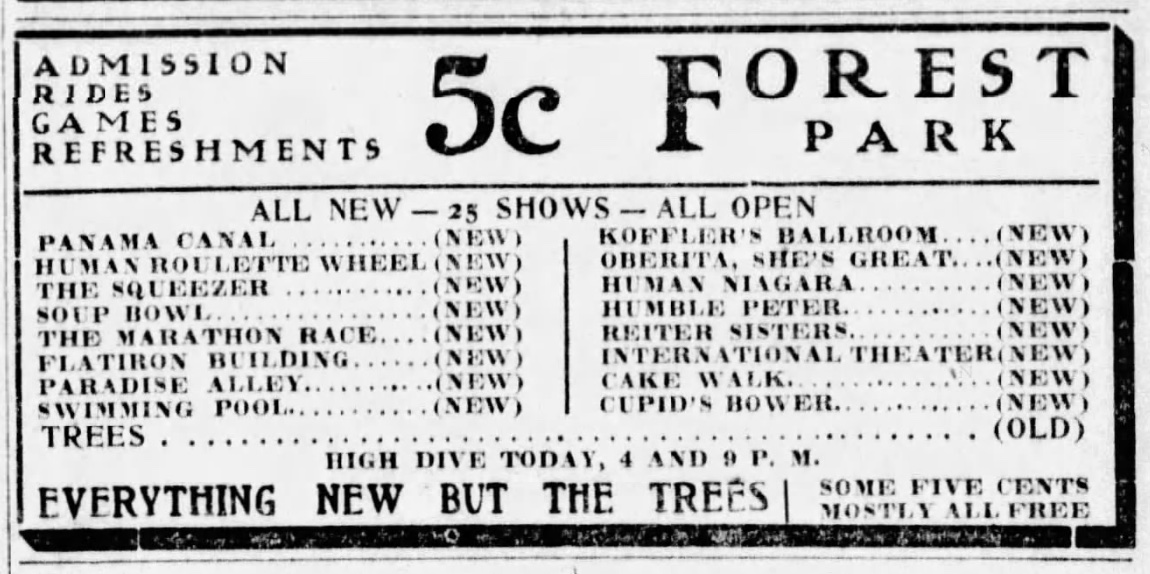
Forest Park was an amusement park from 1903-1912 in what became six blocks of Lykins including McDonald's.

Forest Park was an amusement park from 1903 to 1912 at the corner of Independence and Hardesty Avenues. It featured a scenic railway, a swimming pool, a dance hall, and a beer garden. Its popularity waned with competition from the much larger Electric Park, which the young Walt Disney frequented and called "magnificent" and a direct inspiration for Disneyland.

From 1919-1920, the National Cloak & Suit Company constructed a mail order warehouse at the corner of Hardesty and Independence Avenues, across Hardesty from the former Forest Park. During World War II, the US military bought it and expanded it to become the Hardesty Federal Complex, a sprawling 18-acre (7.3 ha) quartermaster depot. From its establishment in 1942 until the primary military mission concluded in 1960, its mission included storing petroleum products, dry-cleaning supplies, and chemically treating clothing with substances like mustard gas countermeasures. It housed the Army Effects Bureau, a national center for receiving and processing the personal property of soldiers killed in action. These decades of industrial-level activity, including leaks from underground storage tanks and spills of cleaning solvents, resulted in significant soil and groundwater contamination. The primary contaminants were volatile organic compounds (VOCs), specifically trichloroethylene (TCE), and petroleum hydrocarbons, which created an environmental hazard that required a multi-decade cleanup effort overseen by federal and state agencies.

The neighborhood's trajectory shifted dramatically in the mid-20th century. Following the 1954 Supreme Court decision in Brown v. Board of Education, many white families left the neighborhood in a phenomenon called white flight. The decline was severely exacerbated by federal redlining policies pioneered locally by developer J. C. Nichols, which designated the racially diverse Lykins neighborhood as "hazardous" for investment, and by physical fragmentation from the construction of Interstate 70 in Missouri and U.S. Route 71. These factors led to decades of disinvestment and property decline. In 2021, KCUR reported "As of June 25, 49 properties classified as a dangerous building are in Lykins — it's the ZIP code with the third highest number of dangerous buildings in Kansas City." LNA stated that "prior to 2021, there had not been a new house built in Lykins in 25 years". Jackson County's COMBAT program identified Lykins Square Park as a center of violent crime, and initiated trash cleanup events there to engage community involvement about crime, which was undertaken in 2018 by LNA.

=== 21st-century revitalization ===
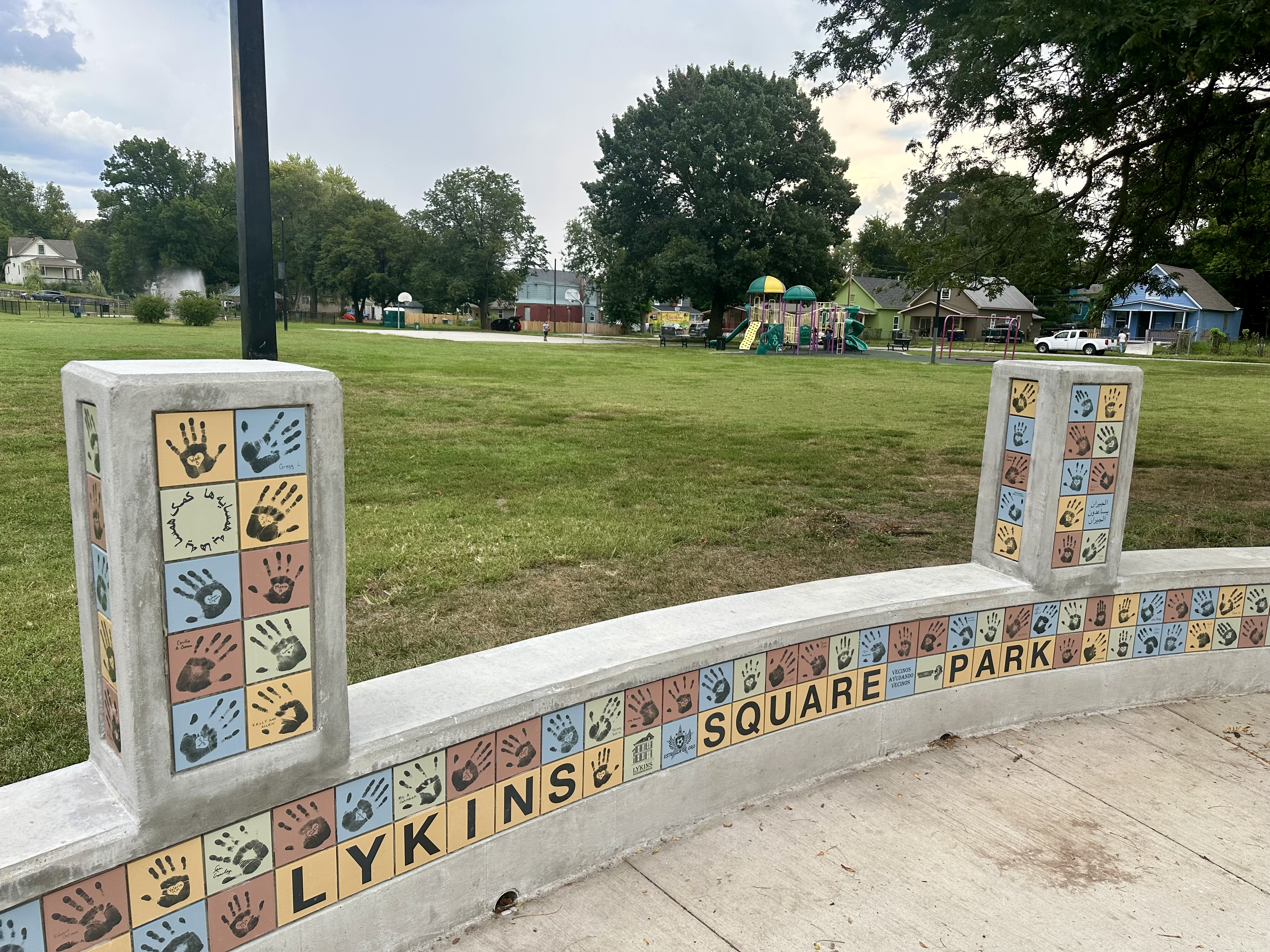
Handprint Plaza is surrounded by tile lettering and individual handprint tiles of hundreds of Lykins children, plus donors, volunteers, and political leaders who supported this phase of revitalization.

In the 21st century, Lykins became a model for community-driven redevelopment, spearheaded by the Lykins Neighborhood Association (LNA). A continuous history of community activism has been provided by several incarnations of LNA since the first recorded group in 1979. The first legal incorporation, Lykins Neighborhood, Inc., was established on August 26, 1985, which survived for over two decades under the same leadership, and was administratively dissolved in 2008. From 2008 to 2013, an unincorporated group of residents continued the work through aggressive blight rehabilitation and police interaction. A new non-profit corporation, the Lykins Neighborhood Association, was formed on June 1, 2013. LNA identified "a very strong correlation" between increasing quality housing and decreasing violent crime, which was an especially visible cycle at Lykins Square Park, the neighborhood's historic centerpiece.

To manage development and blight, the new LNA initiated partnerships in 2018 with community-focused design groups, the Hoxie Collective and Eco Abet. This collaboration produced the foundational Lykins Neighborhood Strategic Development Plan, centering on Lykins Square Park with performance guidelines for new construction. In 2019, Eco Abet organized a design charrette with over 40 professionals to create a new master plan for Lykins Square, including soccer fields, expanded play areas, an exercise trail, a shelter, restrooms, a performance plaza, and a new pocket park across the street. LNA received $600,000 for overseeing park renovation through LNA's staff, voting resident members, and Plaid Design as landscape architect. This includes $300,000 from KC Parks & Recreation as managing owner, $260,000 from the Sunderland Foundation, $10,000 from the Kansas City Museum, and various private donors. In 2024, the park's centerpiece plaza was constructed as a large art piece of nearly 600 ceramic tiles with real handprints from Whittier Elementary students, government employees, and other civic boosters, to give local children a "sense of ownership" in a park that until recently had always been a center for crime.

Concurrently with the park's restoration as the neighborhood's vintage centerpiece, LNA's strategy also positioned itself as Master Developer for rehabilitating buildings. For a few years, the Executive Director of LNA held a dual tenure as a lawyer for Neighborhood Legal Support (NLS). LNA members and staff identified derelict properties, and NLS used Missouri's Abandoned Housing Act to file lawsuits to force rehabilitation by creating a plan with the owner or to take possession of failed properties. LNA legally acquired vacant, dangerous, and condemned buildings from neglectful, under-resourced, or deceased owners; and LNA's network of rehabbers turned them into new or like-new homes. Through this property strategy, diligent code enforcement, and community art projects, LNA reduced the number of known dangerous buildings in Lykins from over 100 to just two between 2019 and 2024. Surrounding Lykins Square, many houses have been built new or rehabilitated. These successes prompted Kansas City Mayor Quinton Lucas to launch a new city-wide blight initiative, starting with a walk-through of Lykins neighborhood in August 2021.

In 2020, the Lykins Neighborhood Trust (LNT) became the pilot project for a nationwide model by the nonprofit Trust Neighborhoods in collaboration with LNA. LNT is a non-profit partner designed to combat gentrification and ensure long-term housing affordability through community control, by making new buildings and rehabilitating existing houses. The LNT was renamed Northeast Neighborhood Trust, and in 2023 received a Neighborhood Stabilization Award from Historic Kansas City for blight rehabilitation with architectural preservation.

Around 2023, the rehabilitation of the Hardesty Federal Complex made major progress. The massive 18-acre (7.3 ha) World War II-era military logistics and munitions hub is being converted into an "affordable" apartment complex and environmentally sustainable, mixed-use community hub. This was enabled by a multi-decade environmental cleanup managed by the U.S. Environmental Protection Agency. The U.S. General Services Administration (GSA) remains responsible for the environmental remediation work, with a total project cost estimated at over $35 million.

== Architecture ==
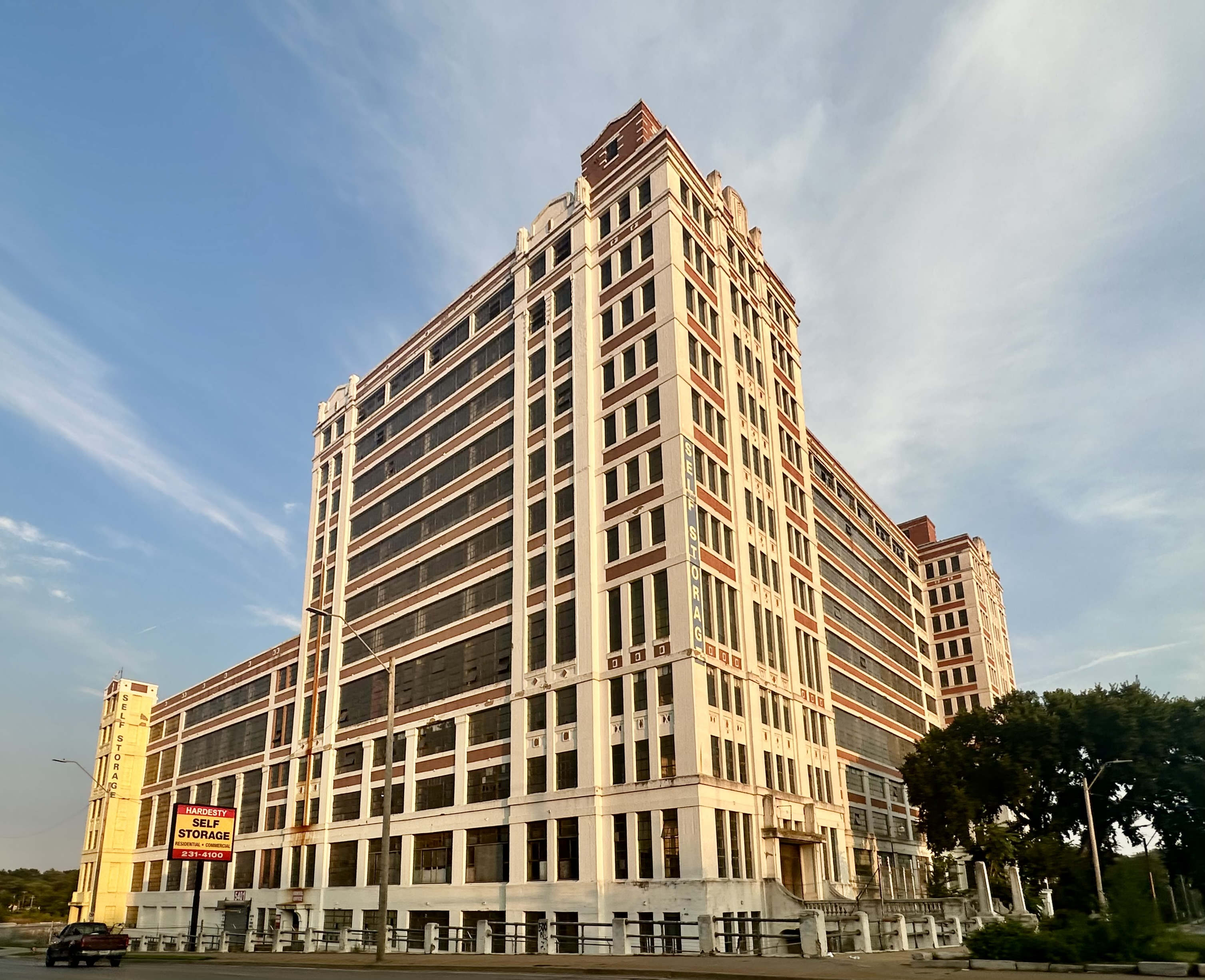
The National Cloak & Suit Company built a mail order warehouse in 1920, which the military expanded during World War II to become the Hardesty Federal Complex. It is an applicant for the National Register of Historic Places due to architectural significance.

The neighborhood's housing stock reflects its development period, offering a collection of architectural styles from the late 1880s through the 1920s. The most common styles are the Queen Anne, with characteristic asymmetrical facades and intricate woodwork, and the American Foursquare, a post-Victorian style noted for its simple, boxy shape. American Craftsman homes and bungalows are also prevalent. Many of these homes feature limestone foundations, large front porches, and stained glass windows.

The T. K. Hanna House at 3230 E 9th Street is the oldest surviving building in Lykins. This large, red-brick Queen Anne style residence was built between 1881 and 1886 for Thomas K. Hanna, a prosperous businessman. The mansion is the only city-designated historic site in Lykins, having been listed on the Kansas City Register of Historic Places on June 10, 1983.

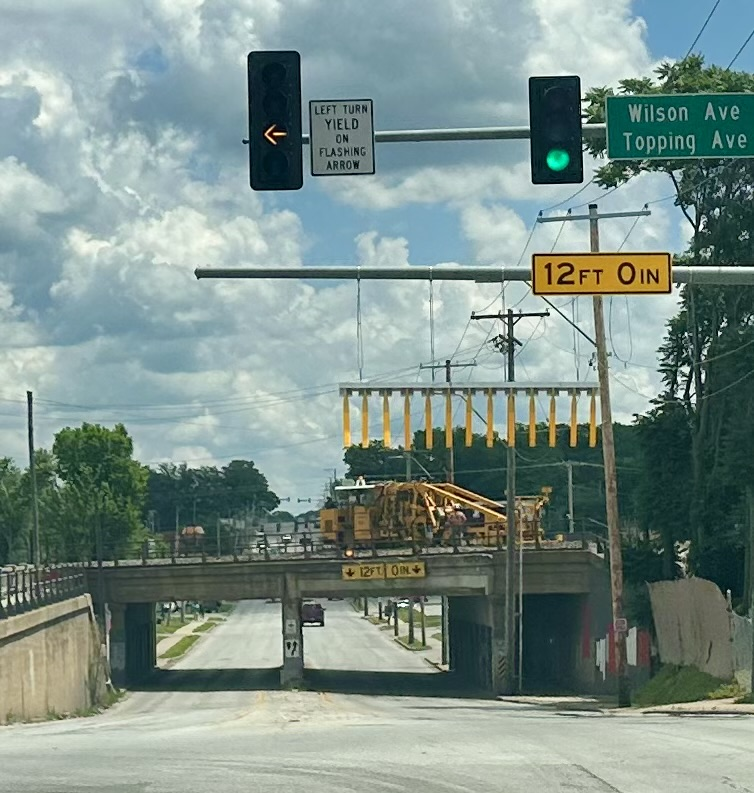
A maintenance vehicle works on the Kansas City Southern Railway above the Truck-eating Bridge, with the overhead yellow warning apparatus and a 12-foot clearance sign, looking eastbound down Independence Avenue.

The Truck-eating Bridge is a minor cultural landmark for the city and a major one for Historic Northeast, which The Kansas City Star called "KC's most notorious bridge" because it likes to "feast" on tall trucks. This railroad bridge crosses above Independence Avenue (which in this area is also U.S. Route 24), and is officially named the Independence Avenue Bridge. Its low clearance of 12 feet (3.7 m) has resulted in countless collisions with tall vehicles over several decades. It is made notorious by several factors: the frequency of crashes; the obviousness of the hazard; the television news coverage; and the comedic social media account giving the bridge a voice about its appetite and victorious scoreboard against trucks. Its victims are mostly professional semi-trailer truck drivers, and as they approach the mouth of the bridge, the view includes the height-restricting curtain which strikes the truck's roof, the flashing warning signs, and then the cavernous bridge. In 2022, to embrace the bridge's reputation, the Northeast Chamber of Commerce and the Independence Avenue Community Improvement District sponsored a mural contest to beautify the structure and call attention to the failure of governmental safety alert attempts.

== Parks and recreation ==
The neighborhood contains two public parks managed by the Kansas City Parks and Recreation Department. Lykins Square is the community's namesake and general social hub. It is a part of George Kessler's 1890s plan for Kansas City's Parks and Boulevards system. Its 1916 Craftsman-style field house by architect Adriance Van Brunt was demolished in 1991 after falling into disrepair. For generations, the park was the venue for school May Day festivals, and its large, concrete-basin wading pool was thronged daily in hot weather. After nearly one century of use, the aging pool was replaced with a modern spray park as part of a 2013–2018 capital improvements initiative.

The Van Brunt Athletic Complex is a major recreational hub for the neighborhood and the wider city. In August 2023, the city completed a major renovation including two new state-of-the-art artificial turf fields, a digital scoreboard, and new lighting. The fields have long been a vital gathering place for Kansas City's immigrant population, particularly as an unofficial hub for the East African and Somali refugee communities for over two decades. The side of the block is adorned with a large community mural featuring dozens of international flags, originally painted around 2007 to combat graffiti.

== Culture ==
The neighborhood's population was 4,368 as of the 2023 ACS 5-Year Estimates. It is one of Kansas City's most diverse areas, with a demographic breakdown of 52.8% Hispanic or Latino, 26.6% Black or African American, and 11.2% White. Other populations include those identifying as two or more races (4.3%), Asian (2.8%), and American Indian or Alaska Native (1.5%). The median household income was $35,900. Lykins is a primary destination for immigrants and refugees, who are supported by resettlement agencies like Jewish Vocational Services (JVS).

Religious institutions include the Rime Buddhist Center & Monastery for Tibetan Buddhism and the Chùa Quan Âm, a Vietnamese Buddhist temple. The student body at Whittier Elementary School speaks over 20 languages, including Spanish, Swahili, Somali, and Burmese. The school is adorned with a large mural representing these world cultures.

Since the early 2000s, public art has been used to deter blight, evolving into a large-scale mural program. The Independence Avenue Community Improvement District (CID) hosts the annual International Marketplace Taste & Tour, featuring a tourist trolley that takes participants to sample food from the area's many international restaurants.

== Education ==
The neighborhood is zoned to schools in the Kansas City Public Schools district. Lykins is served by Whittier Elementary School, located within the neighborhood, and by nearby James Elementary, Northeast Middle School, and Northeast High School.

== See also ==
- History of Kansas City, Missouri
- Pendleton Heights
- City workhouse castle
- Sarah Rector
