= Fairyland Park =

Defunct amusement park

- Interactive map of Fairyland Park
- Location: Kansas City, Missouri, U.S.
- Coordinates: 38°59′26.0″N 94°33′25.3″W
- Status: Defunct
- Opened: 1923
- Closed: 1977
- Owner: The Brancato family (1923–1977)

Attractions
- Roller coasters: 3 (at peak)

Fairyland Park was an amusement park, located at 7501 Prospect Avenue in Kansas City, Missouri. It operated from 1923 to 1977, and closed due to lack of attendance and storm damage in late 1977.

Marcia Brancato Accurso's grandfather, Salvatore "Sam" Brancato, a Sicilian immigrant and blacksmith by trade, came to the United States in 1896. After settling in Kansas City, he went into the grocery business, then began buying real estate. He opened Fairyland Park in 1923. It remained in family ownership until its closing in 1977, one year after Brancato's passing in 1976. Admission to blacks was only to private groups and employees, until 1964. After protest marches, demonstrations, and arrests for blocking the entrance, general admission was desegregated. Admission cost to the park was kept low, 25 cents by 1971. A storm in late 1977, which by some accounts was "a wind storm" or "a tornado", caused extensive damage to the park. This, combined with the nearby park Worlds of Fun caused the venerable park to close.

During the 1950s and 1960s, Fairyland boasted 3 roller coasters, an 8-story Ferris wheel (which was bent in half during a tornado), a swimming pool (double Olympic size and closed in the late 1960s), bumper cars, a shooting range, and a petting zoo at one time. Brancato loved children smiling, and bought the Kiddeland park at 85th and Wornall, moving the rides to Fairyland. Fairyland and its owners tried several gimmicks throughout their later days trying to compete with the newer and more elaborate Worlds of Fun built in 1973. Summer Jams included REO, Dr. Hook, Blue Öyster Cult, Charlie Daniels, and many others in the final summers. In 1967, arson failed to burn the wooden rollercoaster, so the Brancato family commissioned the construction of a new roller coaster, The Wildcat, in 1967. The Wildcat was the park's biggest ride, and helped the park stay competitive. Other promotions included advertising saying "Where 'Fun' is Still Affordable", keeping admission at fifty cents while Worlds of Fun was at five dollars plus parking fee.

== Closure ==
With attendance dwindling, the park suffered major storm damage in the winter of 1977–1978, and never reopened. The Brancato family tried unsuccessfully to redevelop The Fairyland parcel in many forms, and a swap meet and a zoo were mentioned.

The park sat closed from 1978 and its ruins still stood until 1998. In 1990, The Wildcat roller coaster, which had stood at Fairyland abandoned for 11 years, was finally dismantled and moved to Frontier City where it remains. A small plaque in the waiting area indicates its history. The remaining land was finally developed in the early 21st century, with the crumpled remains of the park finally getting hauled off in 2004. Remnants of the Wildcat roller coaster remain in the woods just west of US 71, including many footers and some structural steel bents remain sitting on the ground. The remnants are most accessible during cooler months when vegetation is more forgiving.

The original plot was bordered by Prospect Avenue to the west, 75th Street to the north, 77th Street to the south, and Indiana Avenue to the east. Alphapointe Association for the Blind bought a substantial portion of the property and constructed the Life Skills Campus which serves as its headquarters at 7501 Prospect Avenue. 7.5 of the 80 acres (320,000 m^{2}) of Fairyland Park have been purchased by the city of Kansas City, to build a new police station.

The land the park stood on was eventually bisected by Bruce R. Watkins Drive (U.S. Route 71) during the 1990s. Satchel Paige Elementary School is on Fairyland Park land east of U.S. Route 71.

== See also ==
- Forest Park operated 1903–1912
- Electric Park operated 1899–1925, called "Kansas City's Coney Island" and Walt Disney's inspiration for DisneyLand
