= Chrysler Air-Raid Siren =

Civil defense siren

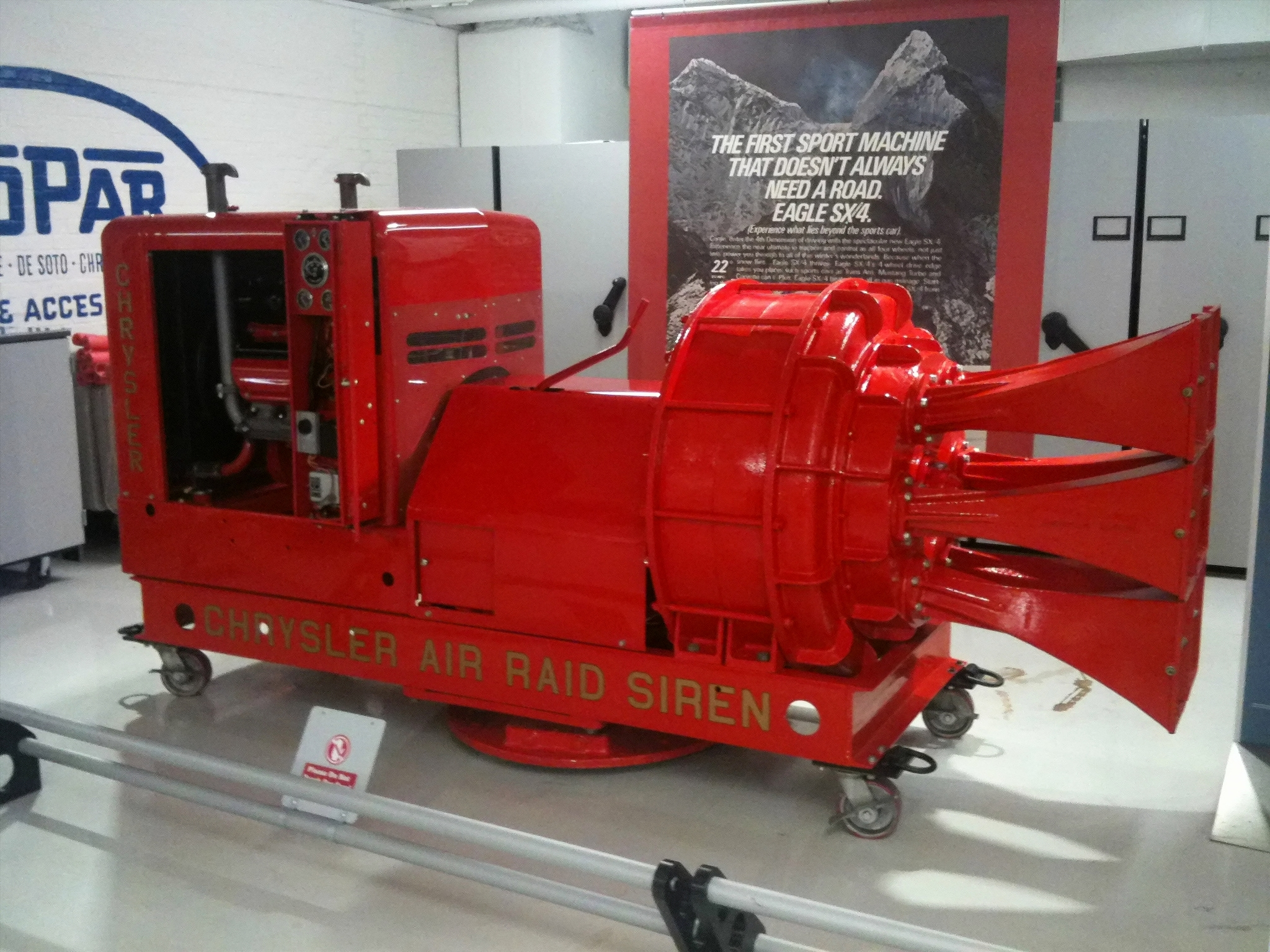
Siren at the former Walter P. Chrysler Museum in 2011, now in storage.

The Chrysler Air Raid Siren is the world's loudest siren, developed by Bell Laboratories and the Chrysler Corporation. It was designed to alert the public to a potential mass attack by the Soviet Union. The siren is powered by a 180 hp (130 kW) Chrysler Firepower Hemi V8 engine on a truck sled, producing a sound output of 138 decibels at 100 feet (30 m). It measures 12 feet (3.7 m) long and weighs an estimated 3 short tons (2.7 t).

The sirens were purchased with assistance from the United States government and installed in cities and counties across the country. After the Cold War ended, most of the sirens were dismantled. Many were moved to museums or acquired by private collectors, and a few remain in their original locations as non-operational local landmarks.

== History ==
The history of the Chrysler Air Raid Siren dates back originally to early 1942, when Bell Laboratories created an experimental engine-powered siren nicknamed "Big Bertha". This siren, whose chopper was driven by a 4-cylinder 20 horsepower Wisconsin engine with a separate American Locomotive Company compressor powered by a 95 hp Ford flathead V8, was the loudest siren in the world when it was created. This siren, developed under the leadership of Dr. Harvey Fletcher, was built to demonstrate the concept of sound generation through forcing pressurized air through a rotary chopper. This siren was tested in New Orleans, LA, but was not put into full production and only a single prototype was built.

On February 25, 1942, the Office of Civil Defense brought Bell Laboratories and Chrysler together in Washington D.C. in order to develop a new siren, which was named the "Chrysler-Bell Victory Siren". Driven by a 140 hp Chrysler IND-9 straight-8 engine, this siren did away with the separate compressor and integrated a two-stage compressor into the siren itself. Constructed in Detroit, MI, 120 of these sirens were sold in 1942 at a cost of $3670 each, with the first units sold to New York City, Detroit, and Chicago. The Chrysler-Bell Victory Siren required an operator to sit atop the siren, which rotated on a turntable at 2 rpm. One experimental unit had an operator's booth underneath instead, though this was not repeated. The Victory-Bell Siren would be renamed to the Chrysler Air Raid Siren in the late 1940s.

The final model of Chrysler Air Raid siren was produced by Chrysler from 1952 to 1957, as part of the United States civil defense system during the Cold War. Its primary purpose was to warn the public of an impending nuclear attack by the Soviet Union. The power plant utilized a Chrysler Firepower Hemi V8 engine with a displacement of 331 cubic inches (5.42 L). The sirens are 12 feet (3.7 m) long and weigh an estimated 3 short tons (2.7 t), with six horns that are each 3 feet (91 cm) long. A user starts the engine and, once it reached operating speed, pulls and releases a transmission handle to generate the signal. The siren rotated on a turntable at 1.5 rpm. Unlike the Victory-Bell Siren, this siren could be operated remotely.

The United States government assisted select state and county law enforcement agencies with the purchase of the sirens. In 1952, the unit cost was US$5,500 (equivalent to about $67,000 in 2025). During their operational years, the sirens were tested periodically. In Los Angeles County, six were placed around key locations of populated areas, and another ten were sold to other government agencies in the state of California. These "Big Red Whistles" (as they were nicknamed) only had testing use. Some were located so remotely that they deteriorated due to lack of maintenance.

After the Cold War, many sirens were removed. Some were relocated to museums or acquired by private collectors, and others were left in place and have deteriorated from a lack of maintenance. In some cases, the salvage value of the sirens is less than the cost of their removal.

In the neighborhood of Phinney Ridge, Seattle, a decommissioned siren is a local landmark. Since 2014, the tower has been decorated annually as a "Holiday GloCone" from Thanksgiving to New Year's.

== Cities with Chrysler Sirens ==
City, State	Number of sirens and status
Camden, New Jersey	2, removed
Chicago, Illinois	5, removed
Dayton, Ohio	4, removed
Detroit, Michigan	20, removed
Grand Rapids, Michigan	4, removed
Greenville, South Carolina	1, standing, non-operational
Horsham, Pennsylvania	1, removed
Jackson, Michigan	1, removed and replaced with a Thunderbolt in 1982
Kansas City, Missouri	3, 2 removed, 1 standing but non-operational. One was formerly located at 47th and Paseo. The final location is the Hardesty Federal Complex.
Lansing, Michigan	1, removed
Los Angeles County, California	24, most removed, a few still in place and operated once a year to honor the Battle of Los Angeles.
Miami, Florida	10, removed
Minneapolis, Minnesota	1, removed
Newark, Delaware	1, removed
Oakland, California	5, removed
Pittsburgh, Pennsylvania	10, 2 removed and in private possession
Pomona, California	1, removed
Portland, Oregon	7, removed
Rochester, New York	2, 1 removed and placed in storage, other one's status is unknown
Rockford, Illinois	3, removed, one in private possession
Salt Lake City, Utah	3, removed
San Francisco, California	1, removed
Seattle, Washington	6, 5 removed, 1 standing and non-operational
Spokane, Washington	3, removed
Trenton, Michigan	3, removed
Sacramento, California	1, removed
Raleigh, North Carolina	1, removed
New Orleans, Louisiana	1, removed (Big Bertha)
