= Hardesty Federal Complex =

Building complex in Kansas City, Missouri

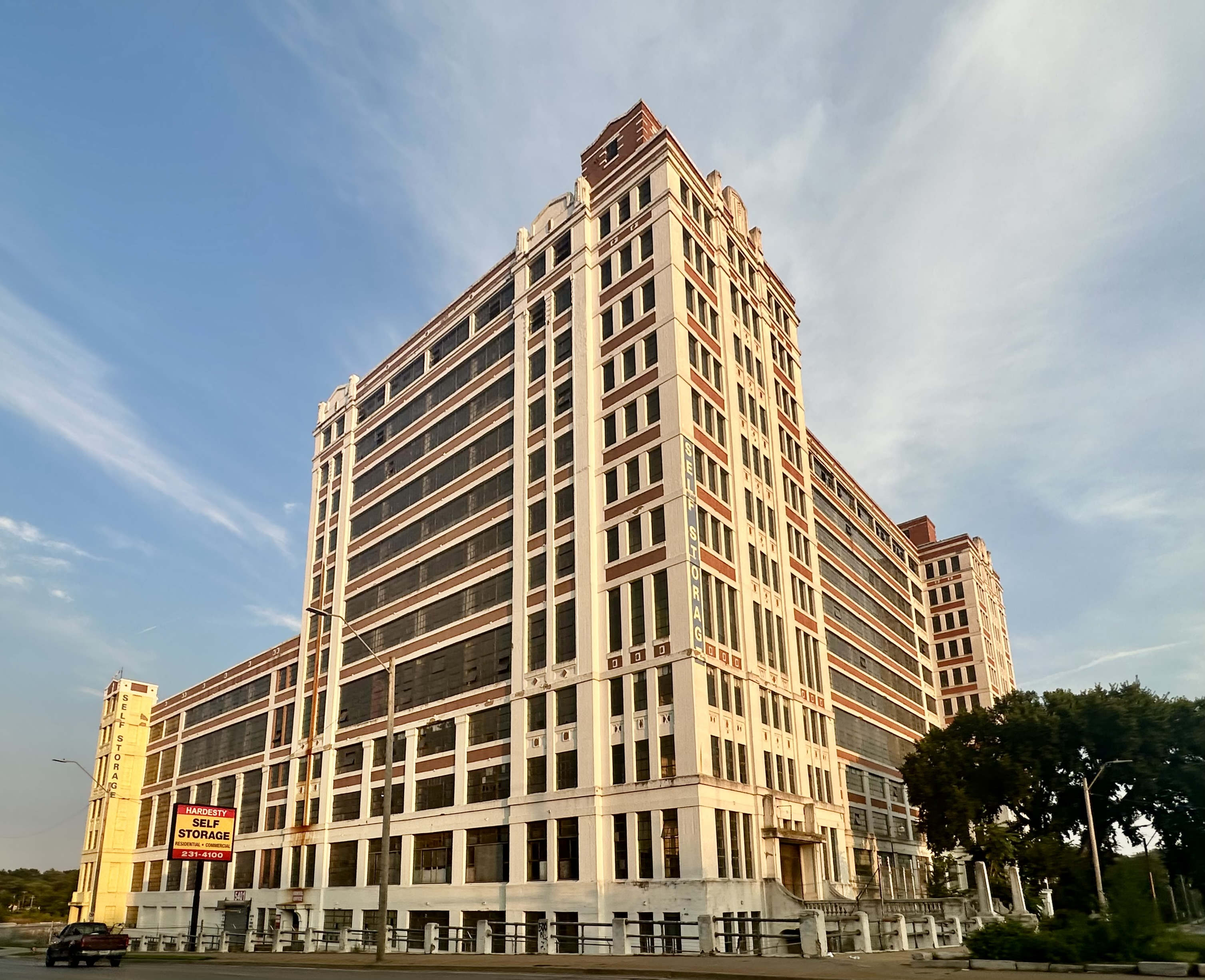
- National Cloak & Suit Company building (2025)
- Interactive map of the Hardesty Federal Complex area
- Former names: National Cloak & Suit Company Building; Kansas City Quartermaster Depot

General information
- Type: Military industrial, turned residential apartments
- Architectural style: Modern Industrial
- Location: 601 Hardesty Avenue, Lykins, Kansas City, Missouri
- Coordinates: 39°06′11″N 94°31′29″W
- Construction started: 1919
- Completed: 1920; 106 years ago

Design and construction
- Architect: N. Max Dunning

The Hardesty Federal Complex is a 22-acre (8.9 ha) site in the Lykins neighborhood of Kansas City, Missouri. The complex is a significant Kansas City example of a Modern Industrial architectural style. Its history of redevelopment reflects one century of major shifts in American commerce, military logistics, and environmental and fair housing policy.

The main building was constructed in 1919–1920 as a massive mail order warehouse for the National Cloak & Suit Company. It was acquired and expanded by the U.S. Army in 1941 to become the Kansas City Quartermaster Depot for global operations of World War II. The military's chemical treatment operations created severe and persistent soil and groundwater pollution that migrated up to one-half mile (0.80 km) into the surrounding neighborhoods, posing possible public health risks for decades through vapor intrusion into homes.

After the war, the General Services Administration (GSA) reused the site for various federal offices until it was vacated in the early 2000s. The GSA's cleanup of the brownfield site under the CERCLA pollution disaster framework was delayed for several years.

In 2023, Arnold Development Group began a large-scale, publicly subsidized revitalization project to convert the complex into a mixed-use residential and commercial district.

== Architecture ==
The main 12-story building and its powerhouse were designed by the prominent Chicago architect N. Max Dunning, a Fellow of the American Institute of Architects, and a veteran of designing public housing for the federal government. The main building is a significant Kansas City example of the Commercial Style, also described as Modern Industrial, within the broad category of Late 19th and Early 20th Century American Movements. The 600,000-square-foot (56,000 m^{2}) facility is a monolithic, reinforced concrete structure built in just six months using a flat-slab construction method with distinctive "mushroom" columns. These flared concrete columns support the floor slabs directly without the need for beams, an innovative system at the time that allowed for vast, open floor plans ideal for manufacturing and warehousing.

The building's interior structure is expressed on its exterior, which presents a rectilinear grid of wide concrete piers and spandrel bands framing large industrial steel-sash windows designed to provide maximum natural light and ventilation. For its architectural significance and role in American commerce, the building was nominated for inclusion in the National Register of Historic Places.

During World War II, the military bought the whole site and added the rest of the buildings.

== History ==
The century of American history at the Hardesty complex spans from having been designed by a veteran architect of public housing for the federal government, to becoming a hub of national commerce, to a critical node in the military-industrial complex, to a vast bureaucratic center, to a derelict and hazardous brownfield, and finally rehabilitated into affordable housing.

=== National Cloak & Suit Company (1919–1941) ===
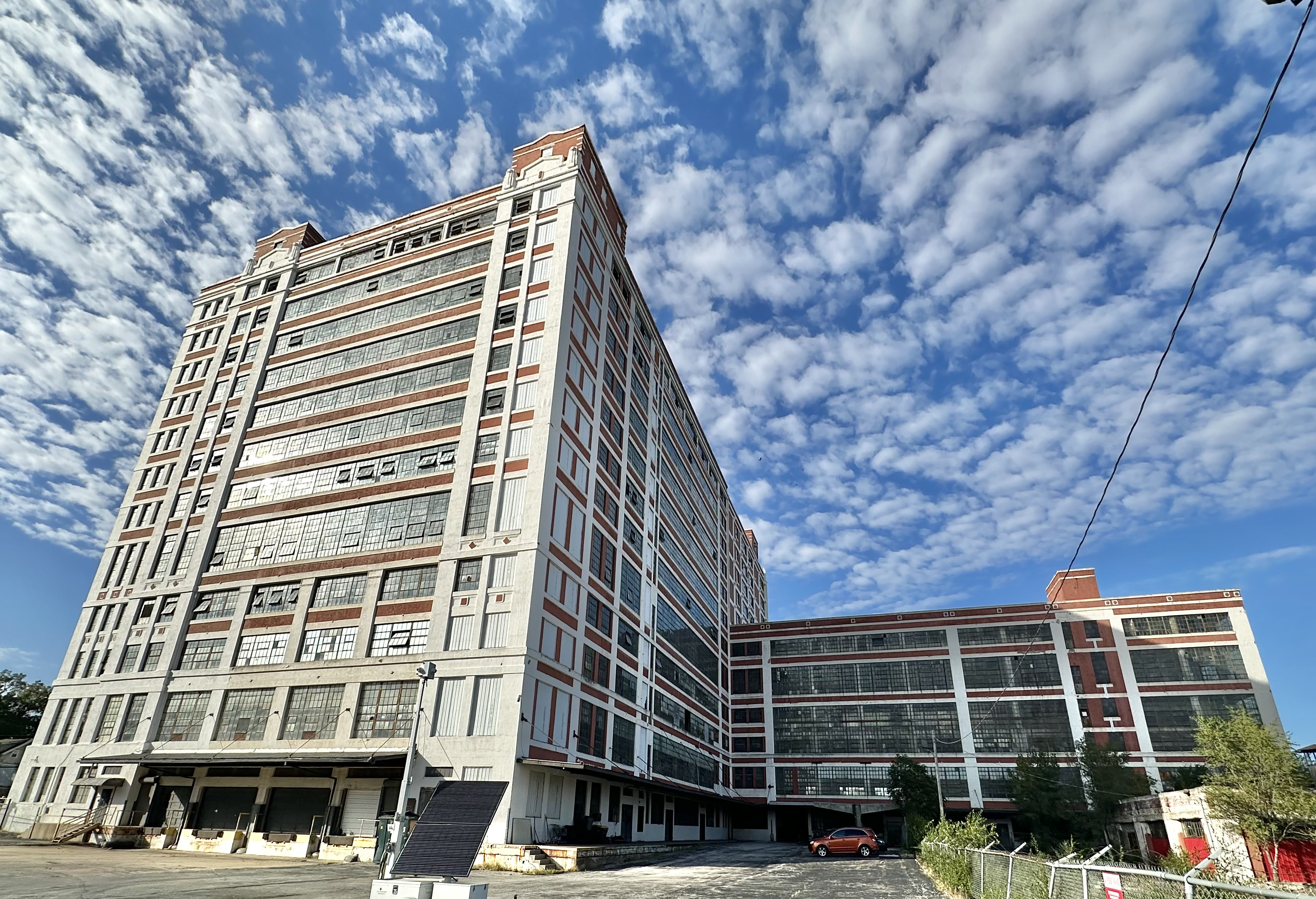
National Cloak & Suit Company building rear

In 1888, the National Cloak & Suit Company was founded in New York City and became a national leader in women's high-style fashions by mail order. Due to a lack of major cities west of the Mississippi River, mail order was popular and the company wanted to expand its warehousing closer to the rest of the nation. For 15 months, it scouted locations such as St. Louis and Chicago, and selected an undeveloped lot in the Lykins neighborhood, a streetcar suburb of Kansas City, Missouri. Decisive factors included Kansas City's position as central railroad hub of the nation, with a freight railroad line at the lot's southern border and an electric streetcar line bordering its north on Independence Avenue for commuters. The main building was constructed in 1919–1921 for $2.5 million (equivalent to $44.1 million in 2024) as the company's second mail-order fulfillment center. It opened with 1,500 employees and peaked in the 1920s with around 2,000 employees, as the distribution center for all 22 states west of the Mississippi River, drastically reducing delivery times for customers. By comparison, Union Station had recently been completed in 1914 for approximately $6 million (equivalent to $188 million in 2024).

In 1927, responding to competitors Sears and Montgomery Ward, National Cloak & Suit merged with its next competitor Bellas Hess & Co. to form the National Bellas Hess Company and expanded into physical retail. In 1927, the company expanded by opening a new, dedicated retail store on Armour Road in North Kansas City. In 1928, it converted 28,000 square feet (2,600 m^{2}) on the first floor of the Hardesty building into a department store, while the upper floors continued mail-order fulfillment. It continued shipping out of the Hardesty facility until 1941, when the property was acquired by the U.S. government to become a quartermaster's depot during World War II.

=== Kansas City Quartermaster Depot (1941–1953) ===
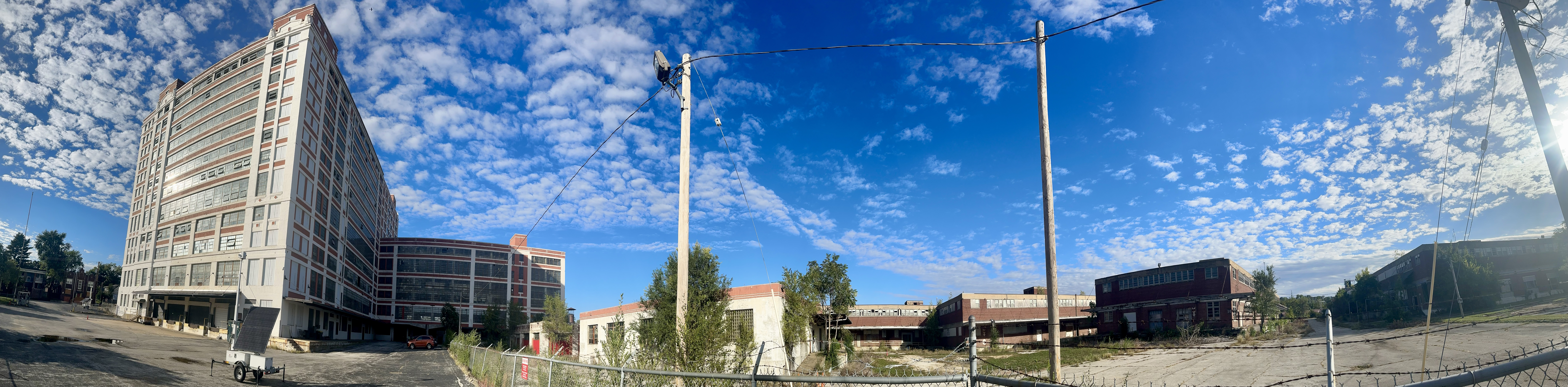
Hardesty Federal Complex, from the southwest rear corner

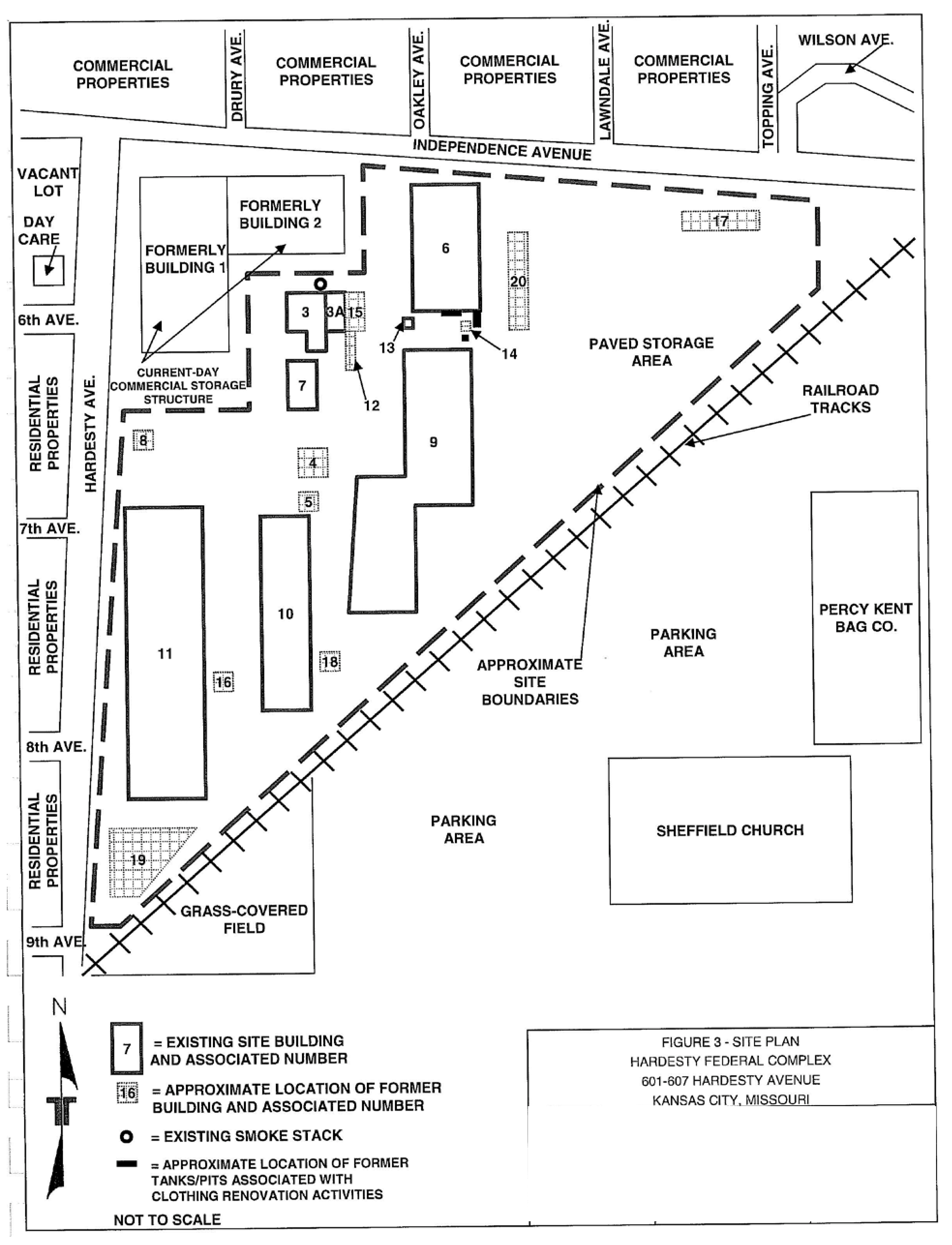
Hardesty Federal Complex site plan

With the United States mobilizing for World War II, the U.S. Army acquired the complex in 1941 and repurposed it as the Kansas City Quartermaster Depot. It was used to store and distribute supplies, including clothing and chemicals, to U.S. Army installations in eight states (Kansas, Missouri, Arkansas, Nebraska, Oklahoma, Wyoming, South Dakota, and Utah), and became a critical logistics hub. The most consequential operations for the site's future took place in Building 6, designated as a clothing treatment plant for the Army's Chemical Warfare Service. In this building, uniforms were laundered, dry-cleaned, and treated with chemical impregnates to make them resistant to chemical warfare agents like mustard gas.

The solvents used in these processes, particularly trichloroethylene (TCE), were spilled and leaked over years of operation, leading to the severe and persistent contamination of the soil and groundwater that would become the site's defining legacy. The depot also housed the Army Effects Bureau, which processed the personal effects of soldiers killed in action. The Quartermaster Depot officially closed in 1953, after the end of the war and its demobilization.

In case of a foreign attack upon Kansas City, President Harry S Truman ordered the military to install upon lofty rooftops, an extremely loud civil defense siren. This building received the world's loudest, a Chrysler Air-Raid Siren powered by a Hemi V8 engine.

=== General federal use (1960–2011) ===
On October 1, 1960, the Department of Defense formally transferred the site to the General Services Administration (GSA), which officially renamed it the Hardesty Federal Complex. Its primary tenant was the Kansas City Records Center, which used the massive warehouse space to store federal documents until operations were moved to subterranean facilities in Lee's Summit, Missouri. The complex housed offices for numerous federal agencies, including the Department of Commerce and the Environmental Protection Agency (EPA). The GSA began to downsize operations in the late 1970s, and by 2002, the site was completely empty. For nearly one decade, the massive buildings sat vacant and fell into severe disrepair, suffering from neglect and extensive vandalism, including the stripping of copper piping.

=== Environmental disaster (2000-present) ===
The legacy of the complex is dominated by its pollution of Kansas City by many hazardous materials from different operational eras, creating a multi-faceted environmental challenge. The most significant contaminants are volatile organic compounds (VOCs), primarily tetrachloroethylene (PCE) and trichloroethylene (TCE), from the WWII-era clothing treatment operations. Other pollutants included petroleum products from leaking underground storage tanks, asbestos used as pipe insulation, lead-based paint, and polychlorinated biphenyls (PCBs) from leaking fluorescent light ballasts.

According to the 2010 U.S. Census, 22,110 people live within a one mile radius of the former Hardesty Federal Complex. ... As shown in Appendix A (Map A-1), populations surrounding the site fall within the top 25% of the 2010 social vulnerability index. The social vulnerability index is used to identify populations that may be especially vulnerable to developing adverse health effects from the release of chemicals from hazardous waste sites. Increased vulnerability may be due to factors such as cultural or language barriers that may limit a person’s access to the benefits of public health outreach efforts. ... As shown in Appendix A (Map A-2), approximately 22% of the population living within a 1-mile radius of the site are females aged 15-44 years. It is especially important to prevent TCE exposure in women of child-bearing age, because of the potential susceptibility of a fetus to adverse health effects from short-term TCE exposures.

— Agency for Toxic Substances and Disease Registry (2016)

Decades of spills and leaks created a significant zone of contaminated soil to depths of 5 to 60 feet (1.5 to 18.3 m), as an ongoing source for a much larger problem in the groundwater. The pollution leached into both a shallow aquifer at 15 to 60 feet (4.6 to 18.3 m) deep and a deeper aquifer at 60 to 120 feet (18 to 37 m). This formed a plume of dissolved chemicals that migrated up to one-half mile (0.80 km), all flowing northeast along an underground downhill trough in the bedrock, from the complex's storage tanks in the Lykins neighborhood into the adjacent South Indian Mound neighborhood across the street. This was confirmed in 2013, when GSA contractor Terracon Consultants verified the off-site migration, triggering federal health agencies to intervene. More than 65 groundwater monitoring wells were installed onsite and in the neighboring South Indian Mound, and more than 300 soil samples were taken. Three of those wells identified high contamination in South Indian Mound: one at the intersection of Wilson Avenue and Belmont Boulevard, and two located 125 feet (38 m) north of the complex property line.

The most direct threat to the community arose from vapor intrusion, where those volatile chemicals in the shallow groundwater turned into a gas and seeped upward through foundation cracks into nearby homes. After the extensive soil and groundwater sampling, indoor air testing was limited to just two residences identified as sitting directly above the highest concentration plume. In a July 2016 health consultation, the federal Agency for Toxic Substances and Disease Registry (ATSDR) evaluated air samples from these two homes and concluded that past exposure to TCE "may have posed increased health risks" to the occupants. The report highlighted that exposure could increase the risk of a congenital heart defect in a developing fetus during the first trimester and that long-term exposure is linked to an increased lifetime risk of developing kidney cancer, liver cancer, and non-Hodgkin's lymphoma. These sources have no record of ever testing any human body.

The cleanup was conducted under the CERCLA with the GSA as the lead responsible agency. The process was plagued by significant delays; a 2014 GSA Inspector General report found that from 2006 to 2010 "little or no action" was taken to advance the cleanup, which fell about one decade behind its original schedule. In further response to Terracon's 2013 study, the GSA installed a sub-slab depressurization system in the most severely affected home and demolished the primary source building, Building 6, in 2021, to be able to excavate the severely contaminated soil beneath it. The total cost for the remediation was projected to exceed $30 million.

=== Redevelopment (2011–2021) ===
In August 2011, the GSA sold its 18-acre (7.3 ha) portion of the site at auction for approximately $500,000 to the Hardesty Renaissance Economic Development Corporation (HREDC), a non-profit established by Asian Americans for Equality. HREDC envisioned a "food hub" with a farmers market and commercial kitchens, but the project failed to gain traction and the complex remained largely undeveloped.

=== Historic Northeast Market District (2021-present) ===
In 2021, Kansas City-based Arnold Development Group announced its proposal and in 2023 finally took control of the property and launched an approximately $400 million redevelopment branded as the Historic Northeast Market District. As of mid-2025, the project was underway to transform the site into a mixed-use, transit-oriented development. Its major components include the adaptive reuse of the main 12-story building into 395 mixed-income apartments, with 83% of the units permanently deed-restricted as affordable housing.

The plan also includes transforming warehouse structures into a 29,500-square-foot (2,740 m^{2}) public market, a commercial kitchen, and public gathering areas. A planned central feature is a large solar array and a system of 228 geothermal wells, an on-site renewable energy infrastructure designed to meet all the energy needs of the development, with the stated goal of eliminating utility bills for the residential tenants. The redevelopment is made financially viable through a complex stack of public subsidies, including federal and state Low-Income Housing Tax Credits, historic preservation tax credits, a local Tax Increment Financing (TIF) plan, and over $7.5 million in EPA Brownfields Program grants.

== See also ==
- City workhouse castle – An 1897 jail and social rehabilitation complex in Kansas City, with a legacy of reuse
- Bannister Federal Complex – Another formerly abandoned and redeveloped federal complex with environmental mass contamination in Kansas City
- Love Canal – The first ever Superfund disaster site contaminated a community
- Rocky Mountain Arsenal – A former US Army chemical weapons facility was successfully redeveloped into a wildlife refuge
- Times Beach, Missouri – A nearby disincorporated ghost town with a community-wide contamination disaster
- Gas Works Park – A public park was created on the grounds of a former industrial plant
