= Asian Americans for Equality =

Civil rights and housing organization in New York City

Asian Americans for Equality (AAFE) is an organization based in Chinatown, Manhattan that advocates for civil rights and affordable housing, which it is also involved in developing.

== History ==
Asian Americans for Equal Employment was formed in 1974 after a successful fight to include Chinese American workers in the construction of Confucius Plaza. It was involved in protests the following year after Peter Yew, an engineer, was beaten by police in Chinatown. 20,000 picketers went to the New York City Hall under AAFE's leadership. It responded in 1982 to the Killing of Vincent Chin in Detroit. AAFE was involved in protesting prison construction and the Special Manhattan Bridge District. The group also gradually became involved in housing issues with programs such as protecting tenants against "negligent and predatory landlords" through lawsuits and helping people learn their rights as tenants.

In January 1985, a building at 54 Eldridge Street burned down, killing two tenants and leaving a further 125 homeless. The fire was caused by wiring and the landlord had previously shut off heat and hot water, leaving residents to use electric heaters. The American Red Cross asked AAFE's executive director at the time, Doris Koo, to provide translation for victims. Koo resolved to shift the organization's focus to building housing. AAFE worked to create Equality Houses with Enterprise Community Partners, two low-income tenements, for a total of 59 units. Thirty percent of units were reserved for homeless people. The project was successful and AAFE continued similar efforts through the 1990s. They were involved in developing "several hundred affordable units in rehabilitated buildings in Chinatown and the Lower East Side". AAFE was involved in the construction of several new buildings. In those decades, the organization grew, spinning off two corporations and becoming a prominent landlord and advocate, a shift for which it attracted criticism. In 1997, the organization reported 3,000 "dues paying members".

The organization has since presented itself as "a cultural broker for new immigrants", helping them navigate the housing process in New York. In 2016, AAFE was described as "the largest developer of affordable housing in Lower Manhattan, having preserved or developed eighty-six buildings with more than seven hundred apartments since 1989".

In 2011, AAFE established the non-profit Hardesty Renaissance Economic Development Corporation (HREDC) to purchase the abandoned Hardesty Federal Complex in Kansas City, Missouri. The organization acquired the site at auction for $500,000 and proposed converting it into a regional "food hub", though the project ultimately stalled and the site was sold to a developer in 2023 to become affordable housing.
