= J. Rieger & Co. =

American distillery

- Type: Distillery
- Founded: 1887 (closed from 1919 to 2014)
- Founder: Jacob Rieger
- Headquarters: Kansas City, Missouri
- Website: www.jriegerco.com

J. Rieger & Co. is an American distillery founded by Jacob Rieger in 1887. Located in Kansas City, Missouri, it was shut down in December 1919 due to the onset of federal Prohibition. The brand was reestablished in 2014 by co-founders Andy Rieger and Ryan Maybee, becoming the first legal distillery in Kansas City since Prohibition.

== History ==
Jacob Rieger immigrated to America from Goritz, Austria in 1877. In 1887 Jacob founded the J. Rieger & Co. distillery in Kansas City's West Bottoms neighborhood, directly across from the Livestock Exchange Building. In 1898, the first official listing of J. Rieger & Co. appears at 1527 Gennessee Street. Not showing any signs of conceding in what was a booming time period in Kansas City's History, a short time later J. Rieger & Co. is expanded to include 1512-1529 Genessee Street.

Jacob turned over operations of the distillery to his only son, Alexander Rieger in 1890. During Alexander's time in charge, J. Rieger & Co. claimed to be the largest mail-order whiskey house in the U.S., with a customer base of 250,000+. The distillery offered over 100 unique products ranging from whiskeys, to gins, rums, and even stomach bitters, reaching customers across the country through direct mail and advertisements.

The company thrived on this business model until the Eighteenth Amendment was passed in 1919, making the production, sale and transport of intoxicating liquors illegal. Like most breweries and distilleries across the country, Alexander was forced to shut the doors of J. Rieger & Co. in December 1919. Shortly after, Alexander Rieger Mercantile Company and Alexander Rieger Investment Company were listed at the same address of the once thriving J. Rieger distillery

Sometime around the 1950s, the original distillery was razed to make way for a parking lot.

J. Rieger & Co. reestablished in October 2014 by Ryan Maybee and Andy Rieger, Jacob Rieger's great-great-great-grandson. J. Rieger & Co. today operates under the original trademark, last owned by Alexander Rieger and expired in 1922.

The distillery is now located in the East Bottoms neighborhood in Kansas City, just three and a half miles from its original location.

== Products ==
Rieger's Kansas City Whiskey is the first product developed and released by J. Rieger & Co. after Prohibition. Kansas City Whiskey is a blend of sourced products: Straight Bourbon Whiskey, Light Corn Whiskey, and Straight Rye Whiskey, all aged at least 4 years, as well as a small amount of 15 year old Oloroso Sherry from the Williams & Humbert Bodega. It is bottled at 92 proof.

Rieger's Midwestern Dry Gin is a London Dry style gin made from a wheat spirit base and incorporates five botanicals: Juniper, Licorice root, Angelica Root, Coriander, and Orange Peel. The recipe for Midwestern Dry Gin was developed by Tom Nichol, former Master Distiller of Tanqueray.

Caffè Amaro is blend of a traditional Amaro with cold brew coffee. Caffè Amaro is characterized by its bitter, slightly sweet flavor which stems from the use of botanicals, herbs, and cane syrup. Caffè Amaro is a collaborative spirit with Kansas City-based coffee roasters, Thou Mayest, who selects a single origin coffee roast to make a cold brew coffee that is used to cut the Amaro spirit base to proof. The product spends a brief amount of time in barrel.

Rieger's Midwestern Premium Vodka is made from 100% Wheat Neutral Grain Spirit. The product is given a final distillation in a 750-gallon copper pot still, and carbon-filtered.

Left For Dead is a spirit distilled entirely from Kansas City-based Boulevard Brewing Company beer, with each batch being made from a different Boulevard product, or multiple beers in some cases, which would have otherwise been discarded. The final product is bottled at 89 proof, a nod to 1989, the year Boulevard was founded.

In July 2023, the company released their first canned cocktail named after the Electric Park District, a historic district in Kansas City, made with Rieger's vodka.

== Reception ==
Finalist (top 4) for International Best New Spirit/Cocktail Ingredient at the 2015 Tales of the Cocktail Spirited Awards.
