= Brownfield regulation and development =

Brownfields are defined by the Environmental Protection Agency (EPA) as properties that are complicated by the potential presence of pollutants or otherwise hazardous substances. The pollutants such as heavy metals, polychlorinated biphenyls (PCB), poly- and per-fluoroalkyl substances (PFAS), and volatile organic compounds (VOCs) contaminating these sites are typically due to commercial or industrial work that was previously done on the land. This includes locations such as abandoned gas stations, laundromats, factories, and mills. By a process called land revitalization, these once polluted sites can be remediated into locations that can be utilized by the public.

Legislation regarding brownfields was enacted in the United States at the federal level beginning in the late 1900s with the Resource Conservation and Recovery Act, initially only applying to locations with active hazardous waste. CERCLA, or Superfund, passed in 1980, is one of the more influential programs in the redevelopment of these lands, and has since been amended to expand its impact. The Brownfield Revitalization and Environmental Restoration Act, passed by the Bush Administration in 2002, granted additional funding for clean-up. The European Union has both the European Regional Development Fund and the Cohesion Fund to aid in the remediation of these brownfield sites. Additionally, the EU has released seventeen Sustainable Development Goals to encourage nations around the world to both prevent and reduce a variety of harmful practices that contribute to the creation of brownfields. "Polluter pays" is a principle that has been introduced in many different countries, including the United Kingdom and China, assigning responsibility to the party that did the contamination. These measures have been taken to help reduce the impact of brownfield sites internationally.

== Background ==
Common contaminants found in brownfields include PFAS and heavy metals, in addition to other compounds that can cause economic, environmental, and social issues when present. Human health can be impacted by means of cancer, brain damage, immune and nervous disorders, liver and kidney disease, and birth defects. Brownfields are often located in areas with high populations of low income or minority groups making this an environmental justice issue. Brownfields do not provide employment, tax revenue, amenities, and make no use of existing infrastructure, thus enabling urban sprawl. Improvements from remediation and redevelopment of brownfields include increased tax revenue, private capital, improved public and environmental quality, and greenspace preservation. A successful international example is in the Szechuan River, China where restoration by Shaanxi Provincial Land Engineering Construction Group altered polluted land for commercial, residential, and public usage.

== Regulations in the United States ==
Federal and state legislation pertinent to U.S. Brownfield policy is numerous and diverse. The most important include the Resource Conservation and Recovery Act (RCRA), the Community Reinvestment Act (CRA), (CERCLA Superfund), and the Small Business Liability and Brownfields Revitalization Act.

=== Federal level ===
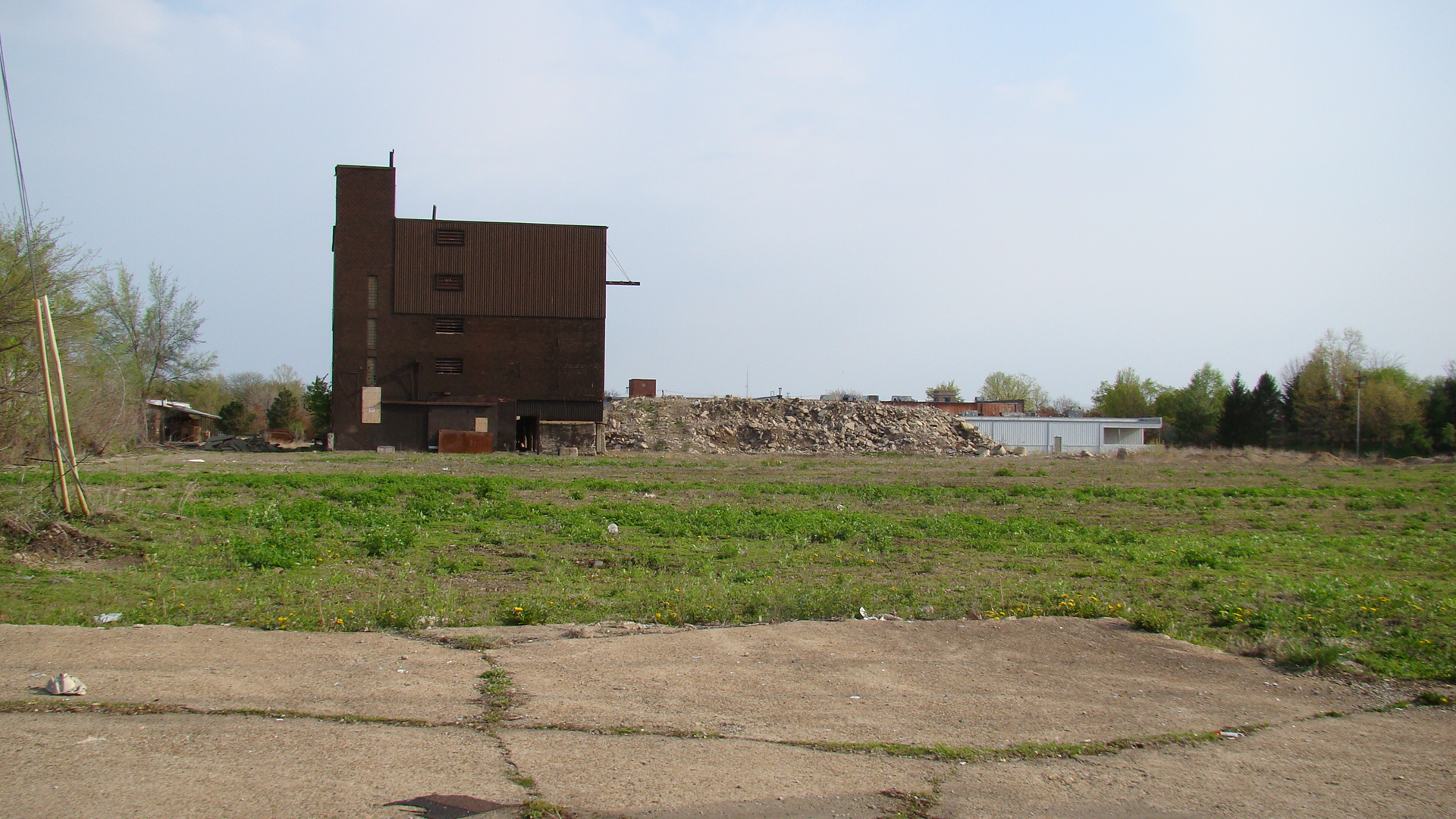
An example of a brownfield.

==== Resource Conservation and Recovery Act (RCRA) ====
The Resource Conservation and Recovery Act was passed in 1976 and is the federal government's approach to the regulation of hazardous waste under a “cradle to the grave” scheme. It is important to Brownfields because at birth, RCRA applied only to active hazardous waste sites. It included no remedial or retroactive measures for regulating hazardous releases occurring before its passage. This deficiency helped lead to the passage of the Superfund legislation in 1980.

==== Community Reinvestment Act (CRA) ====
The Community Reinvestment Act was passed in 1977. Legislative intent behind the CRA was to incentivize the redevelopment of Brownfield properties. The Act was intended to force lenders to provide capital to the low and middle-income borrowers who lived proximally to Brownfield properties. The idea was that urban inhabitants would borrow money and invest in their neighborhoods, the development of which would require the remediation of the local Brownfields. However instead of investing in urban neighborhoods, many borrowers took the easy money and instead invested in “Greenfields,” or suburban and rural properties with fewer developmental risks. Essentially, an unintended side effect of the Act was the perpetuation of urban sprawl.

==== Comprehensive Environmental Response, Compensation and Liability Act (CERCLA) or Superfund ====
Superfund was passed in 1980 and among other things, granted EPA the authority to regulate cleanup of Superfund and Brownfield sites. Importantly, CERCLA does not preempt state clean-up laws and when passed, it did not distinguish between small and large generators of hazardous waste. In order to remediate a site, a party must comply with both state and EPA guidelines. There is no guarantee that compliance with state requirements will prevent further EPA regulation in the future. This complex liability scheme is a major disincentive faced by developers who under other circumstances, might be inclined to invest in remediating Brownfields.

==== Small Business Liability and Brownfields Revitalization Act6 ====
The Small Business Liability and Brownfields Revitalization Act was passed in 2002 and amended CERCLA to limit the liability faced by developers, especially small developers. It lists a number of exceptions to Superfund liability but only to Brownfield sites.

===== Exemptions from Superfund liability =====
- Bona Fide Prospective Purchasers – A release from liability of prospective purchasers even if they knew about the existence of contamination, but all contamination took place prior to purchase.
- Contiguous Landowner Defense - If a landowner's property happens to abut a Brownfield site and they can prove by a preponderance of the evidence that they were not aware of any release of hazardous material, and did not consent to its release, then they qualify for an exemption.
- Innocent Landowner Defense – If for instance, a landowner happened to lease their property to a polluter and can prove by a preponderance of the fact of not being not aware of any release of hazardous material and did not consent to its release, the landowner qualify for an exemption.

===== Windfall profit lien provision =====
If EPA incurs costs in cleaning up a site, and that site is subsequently sold for a profit, this exception allows EPA to impose a lien on the profits of the sale to recoup their costs of remediation.

===== De micromis exemption =====
Attempt by the Act to distinguish between small and large generators of waste. It defines a small generator of waste according to a series of limits, that if met qualify the generator for exemption. These limits are:

- Contribution of less than 100 gallons of liquid waste
- Contribution of less than 200 pounds of solid waste
- Employment of less than 100 people

===== Increase of funds for redevelopment of brownfield sites =====
Increased the amount of federal funds available for brownfield redevelopment from $98 million to $200 million. Expired in 2006.

===== Federal enforcement deferral =====
An assurance by EPA that if state cleanup regulations are followed, that it will not require further remediation activities in the future. However, EPA reserves the right to require further cleanup if contamination crosses state lines, if new information on a site comes to light, or if it judges that a release presents an imminent and substantial danger.

=== State level ===
As a general rule, most state regulatory schemes resemble CERCLA in structure, though there is not one "cut and dry" state approach to regulating brownfields. CERCLA does not preempt state regulation. In an attempt to limit developer liability, states have come up with various methods to try to limit the risk of the EPA requiring cleanup on top of what they require themselves. A Voluntary Cleanup Plan (VCP) is an agreement between a developer and a state that once a site has been remediated according to state regulations, that the state will not require cleanup in the future. The EPA uses a similar tool called a State Memorandum of Agreement (SMOA), which is an agreement between a developer and the EPA that EPA will not take future remediation action once compliance with the state VCP has been achieved.

== International ==
=== European Union ===
International brownfield sites are also important to take into consideration, with around 70% of individuals in the European Union (EU) residing in urban or suburban areas facing issues of urban sprawl, scattered development, urban dispersion, soil sealing, as well as air, soil, and water pollution. To properly accommodate growing population demands of housing, employment, and infrastructure, redevelopment of contaminated lands is crucial. The European Regional Development Fund and Cohesion Fund aid industrial and military brownfield redevelopment. A main issue to be resolved is the lack of standards to strictly define contaminated sites, as well as methodology to define site specific remediation standards. Contaminated sites are usually located near city centers, appealing to investors through planning, financial support, and administrative and governmental procedures. By creating understanding and communication between academia, the public sector, and private developers, projects can be fully effective and beneficial.

The EU 2030 Agenda for Sustainable Development and Sustainable Development Goals include reducing negative impacts of urban activities and chemicals which are hazardous to human and environmental health; and environmentally sound chemical management plans, reduction and recycling of waste, and efficient water and energy usage. The 7th Environmental Action Programme of the EU 2050 vision focuses on innovative economy with minimal waste, sustainable natural resource management, biodiversity protection, and low carbon growth. Polluters are expected to pay the cost of remediation on the basis of the “polluter pays principle”, however it is not strictly enforced and alternative sources of funding are often required. The primary funding mechanisms are the Cohesion Fund and European Regional Development Fund (ERDF) which supports regional, cross-border, and multicity redevelopment. The Cohesion Fund focuses on environmental health by redeveloping cities and decontaminating brownfield sites. The ERDF allowed €278 billion to the European Structural and Investment Funds of 2014–2020 to take “action to improve the urban environment, to revitalize cities, regenerate, and decontaminate brownfield sites.” The Urban Innovative Actions based on the ERDF had a budget of €372 million throughout 2014–2020 to dedicate funding for sustainable land usage and planning. The L’Instrument Financier Pour l’Environnement had a 2014-2020 budget of €3.4 billion for projects relating to air, chemicals, green and circular economy, waste, water, soil, and urban environments. Additionally, the European Investment Bank funds public-private investment, research, and projects providing opportunity for contaminated site remediation.

A case of unused 83 hectare, Austro-Hungarian military buildings located in Oradea, Romania from the 1990s was redeveloped in 2016. The site contamination led to hazardous soil and was redeveloped as an industrial park over a greenfield alternative, planned to avoid sprawl, and was funded by local public authorities and private investment. The city of Aigio, Greece utilized €2,296,258 of funding from ERDF to redevelop the seafront to a recreational area, improving green spaces and quality of life for the residents. This is categorized under Investment Priority 6e “Taking action to improve the urban environment, to revitalize cities, regenerate and decontaminate brownfield sites (including conversion areas, reduce air pollution, and promote noise-reduction measures”, as well as “Support for integrated urban development” in Specific Objective 6.e.1. Additionally in Riga, Latvia the ERDF funding of €54,000,000 was used in five regeneration projects, three of which were completed. The main goal was to develop cultural assets and revitalize neglected areas to create more attractive urban settings. One of the projects transformed a former factory to the VEF Cultural Palace. A former coal mining area in Liège, Belgium was remediated using €963,800 of ERDF funding to develop a business park integrated in the urban setting. Businesses included a furniture designer, and heating company that produced heat pumps and solar panels. Around 30% of the EU territory is spatially fragmented, decreasing connectivity and health of ecosystems with issues of water quality, air pollution, unsustainable land usage, and soil degradation. By integrating future sustainability and development goals through remediation of brownfields, improvement of public health and urban settings can be achieved with successes that can be globally applicable.

=== China ===
Urbanization of China results in high demand for land in towns and cities to accommodate industry and population growth, also posing the challenge of contaminated industrial sites within cities. A 2014 soil survey conducted by the Ministry of Environmental Protection of China (currently Ministry of Ecology and Environment of the People's Republic of China, or MEE) and the Ministry of Land and Resources of China (now the Ministry of Natural Resources of the People's Republic of China), revealed the extent of soil contamination, implicating that around 36% of sampling points were near proximity to industrially contaminated sites, thus potentially contaminated. The MEE outlined ‘Opinions on Strengthening the Prevention and Control of Soil Pollution’ in 2008 for completing the investigation of soil pollution in a comprehensive manner, establish a soil environmental monitoring network, compiling national and local soil pollution prevention and control plans, establishing policies and laws for soil pollution prevention and control, and establishing a management framework such as laws and regulations. An ‘Action Plan on Prevention and Control of Soil Pollution’ was created in 2016 detailing requirements, work plan, and goals of the national soil contamination prevention priorities.

In the United States, CERCLA was criticized for lengthy legal proceedings, burdens on small businesses, and lack of involvement from state and local governments as the main actions fall to the federal government. Amendments such as the Small-Scale Corporate Responsibility Mitigation and Brownfield Revitalization Act of 2002 aided these issues. The United Kingdom established the Interdepartmental Commission for Redevelopment of Polluted Sites (ICRCL) to address contaminated sites and created legislation in 1990 to regulate these sites through the Environmental Protection Law. Drawing on experience from these countries, crucial aspects for brownfield remediation and redevelopment include legal and regulatory systems, public participation throughout the entire project process, establishment of a register that publishes information and mobilizes participants, funding system including financial allocation and tax relief, and finally a ‘polluter pays’ system. A key difference in China is land ownership which is state controlled with individuals and businesses only having the right of land use. The challenges of managing brownfields is still complex as there are multiple levels of governmental control such as different Ministries, planning and development offices, expert groups, and residents’ groups to name a few.

The National Development and Reform Commission handles national-level planning, spatial planning, and national development planning to improve ecological protection and cleaner production. The Ministry of Water Resources organizes preparation and implementation of water resource protection, protects drinking water sources, guides groundwater management, protection, development, and utilization, guides management and protection of important bodies of water, and guides ecological protection and restoration of water, flow, and system connectivity. The Ministry of Housing and Urban-Rural Development handles transfer, development, and utilization of urban land use rights, improvement of small town/village environment, implementation of major energy conservation projects, and promotion of urban emission reductions. The Ministry of Agriculture and Rural Affairs organizes rural living environment improvement as well as environmental management of agricultural sectors and cleaner production. Ownership interpretation and land use policies could pose a challenge in the future due to the complexity of land ownership in China.

The UK and US have soil protection laws, with procedures to evaluate local conditions, regulate contaminated sites, and improve effectiveness of urban contaminated sites. China created a law to protect the ecological environment, prevent and control soil pollution, protect public health, promote sustainable soil usage, construct ‘ecological civilization’, and promote sustainable economic and social development. For local soil management, local governments should evaluate soil levels, risk management, technical reviews, and public participation and information to improve the contaminated land. Conditions for brownfield management should consider differences in economic and social development between different regions, availability of supporting infrastructure (landfills, storage, disposal), level of competence, pollution history, and exposure risks. These conditions applied in regional and phased manners would effectively manage contaminated sites throughout the country. For organization of brownfields, creating a registration system to keep track of the amount, pollution status, location, and size of contaminated sites to be investigated. This system will allow for brownfield sites to be managed hierarchically and classification of the site and development can be achieved. The MEE released the Measure for the Management of Soil Environment in Contaminated Land, outlining a comprehensive procedure for definition to supervision. The owner and user fill in the information system, then the MEE distributes it with urban and rural planning departments and land and resources departments. The land use holder is also responsible for site investigation, risk assessment, and remediation potential and compile a preliminary survey report, detailed survey report, risk assessment report, risk control plan, contaminated land remediation plan, and control and remediation evaluation report. Many brownfields come from old state-owned enterprises like petrochemical and metal processing plants, and over the years have been shut down making responsible parties hard to identify.

Responsibility identification is thus one of the major issues facing brownfield management and remediation. In both the United Kingdom and the United States, enforcement powers ensure that polluters fulfil their obligations along with proper division of responsibility between central and local governments. The US has given USEPA powerful law enforcement powers with penalties on polluters and improve environmental protection awareness of enterprises. The UK has given comprehensive powers to local environmental protection and health departments and plans to group environmentally related sectors into the USEPA for increased unity and strength.

The National Expert Committee advises on governance and site investigations, support for risk assessment, redevelopment management, and proposal of research areas. The committee should be composed of various scientific experts as well as stakeholders, in addition with an ‘Environmental Pollution Reconstruction’ or Brownfield Management Supervision Committee to supervise and evaluate risk assessment and remediation at contaminated sites. In a similar sense, in 2019 the MEE created an Expert Advisory Committee on Soil Ecology and Environmental Protection with experts on soil, groundwater, agriculture, and rural affairs. Establishing a financial support system for brownfield issues is important. In the US the process includes methods to determine the responsible parties of polluted sites, reducing legal and administrative costs by the government and small businesses, consideration of tracking limitations of responsible parties for inability to cover remediation costs, and site remediation is extremely expensive and requires a sustainable funding system. In the UK, the private sector funds most land development and rehabilitation projects. Other countries have set responsibility to begin with the polluter, then to the landowner, and then to the government.

Basic principles of China's ‘polluter pays’ process include the individual/groups that cause soil pollution have the main responsibility for control and restoration, if responsibility changes the inheritor will bear the responsibilities, if the responsible party is not clear the people's government at the county level will have the responsibilities, when the land use right is transferred the responsible person agreed by the parties involved will bear responsibilities, if land use right is terminated the original land use right holder will have the responsibilities, and a lifelong responsibility system will be implemented to treat and mitigate soil pollution. "Measures for the Administration of Special Funds for the Prevention and Control of Soil Pollution include (1) detailed investigation, monitoring and evaluation of soil pollution, (2) investigation and risk assessment of construction land and agricultural land, (3) prevention and control of soil pollution sources, (4) management and control of soil pollution risks, (5) remediation and treatment of soil pollution, (6) support to the establishment of provincial soil pollution prevention funds, and (7) enhancement of soil environmental supervision capabilities and other matters closely related to the improvement of soil environmental quality.” The Ministry of Finance reviews and determines funding arrangements of provinces, autonomous regions, and municipalities in accordance with MEE proposals. Issues such as soil remediation goals and planning for brownfield reuse are important to address.

Most of the brownfield sites for redevelopment are located in cities, and can be used for residential or commercial purposes to obtain the greatest land price. However, many have pollution history spanning half a century or more. Time constraints for redevelopment and remediation, as well as expenses can make complete restoration unlikely to achieve a goal of pristine conditions, applicable for multiple purposes. Soil screening and intervention values were released in 2018, however there is no set remediation value in China yet. Physical, chemical, and biological treatment applications have been utilized for brownfield areas, and paired with scientific evaluation can yield credible decisions regarding remediation goals and costs. To ensure long-term success, an integrated framework for brownfield management is key as China experiences high urbanization and industrialization. In the UK and US, the central government guides brownfield management on a macro level, with specific sites managed by local governments and stakeholders. This contrasts with China's strong central and provincial planning, paired with its single land public ownership system for overall land use planning and site remediation. A framework with participation from the public and government paired with information disclosure through the Internet, TV, and newspapers allows the general public to raise questions and input information, strengthening the redevelopment and remediation of urban brownfields.

== Issues ==
=== Progress on brownfields restoration ===
Because of the growing considerations and acceptance of both federal and state agencies, more and more underused and abandoned properties are being redeveloped.

- 1994, the Clinton Administration approved the Brownfields Tax Incentive to Speed Urban Cleanup, Redevelopment.
- 1997, the Clinton Administration announced its Brownfields National Partnership.
- 1997, Congress approved the Balanced Budget Act.
- 2002, the Bush Administration approved the Brownfield Revitalization and Environmental Restoration Act.
- 2009, the United States Department of Housing and Urban Development (HUD) issued a revised contamination policy for HUD-assisted multi-family housing projects.
- 2009, brownfield redevelopment claims part of the EPA Report on Fighting Climate Change.

=== Cost ===
One of the major concerns with Brownfield development is the cost of cleaning up the area. However, with the passing of the Small Business Liability Relief and Brownfields Revitalization Act, there are now funds available from the Federal Government to help in the cost of cleaning.

Another option for assistance is the Brownfields Tax Incentive program, which was signed into law in 1997 and extends through December 31, 2011. The tax incentives goal is to encourage the cleanup and reuse of brownfields and the environmental cleanup costs are fully deductible in the year incurred. To qualify for this incentive the property must be owned by the taxpayer incurring the cost and there must be hazardous materials on the site.

Other federal grants and programs insist of providing either funding or technical assistance in assessing, cleaning, and revitalization of brownfields.

There are also low interest loans and grants offered by states to help in the cost of cleanup if the property meets the eligibility requirements.

=== Liability and risk ===
Liability issues are of extreme importance to brownfield remediation. Foremost, developers run the risk of being held accountable for future remediation efforts if EPA or the state imposes additional requirements. Private parties must consider whether and when public groups should participate in control-site decisions pertaining to:

1. The specific current actions and reasonable likely future uses of the site,
2. The selection of remediation and an appropriate institutional control that allow or forbid activities,
3. And associated continuing responsibilities.

Other risk and liability issues associated with brownfield redevelopment include:

- Public perception of redeveloped brownfield property
- Potential risks to receptors (e.g., types and concentrations of chemicals of concern)
- Potential exposure pathways (e.g., terrestrial surface radiation, inhalation, ingestion, dermal)
- Potential risks to human and ecological receptors (e.g., office workers, construction workers, residents, endangered species)

== See also ==
- American Recovery and Reinvestment Act of 2009
- Brownfield Land
- Brownfield status
- Hazardous Waste
- National Environmental Policy Act
