= Electric Park, Kansas City =

Defunct genre of amusement park

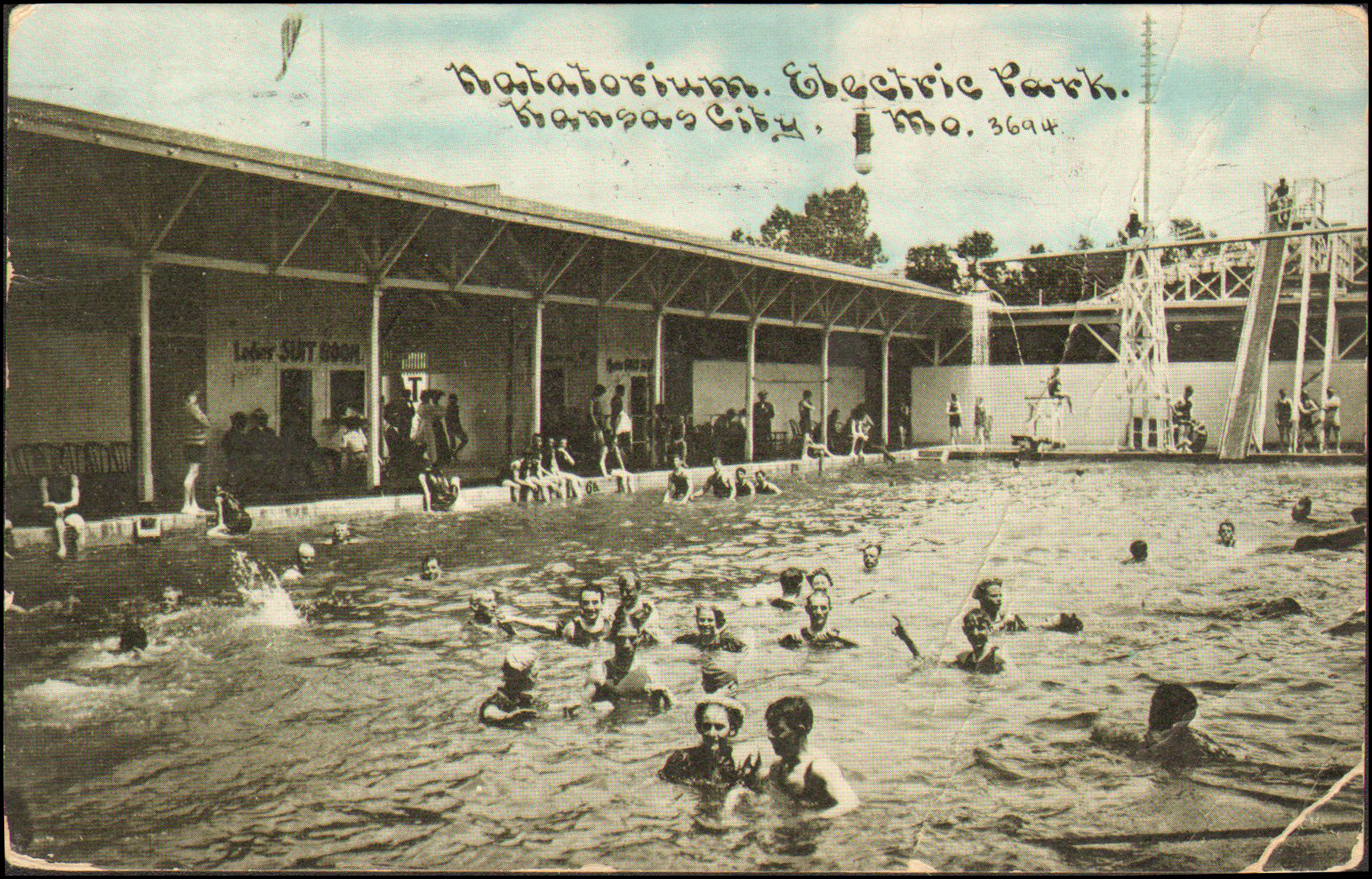
Electric Park, year unknown

Electric Park was the name shared by two amusement parks in Kansas City, Missouri, operated by the Heim Brothers Brewery from 1899 to 1925. The original park was a popular local attraction via streetcar in the East Bottoms, and the larger second park became a major regional destination.

The second Electric Park (1907–1925), located at 46th Street and The Paseo, was a trolley park known for its extensive attractions and brilliant nightly illumination, earning it the nickname "Kansas City's Coney Island". At its height, it attracted one million visitors per year. It was abruptly destroyed in a large fire in 1925. Walt Disney later cited his childhood memories of the second park's design and atmosphere as a primary inspiration for his creation of Disneyland.

== First park ==
The Heim brothers built the first Electric Park in land adjacent to the Heim Brothers Brewery (the largest brewery in the world) in East Bottoms. The amusement park was bounded by Montgall, Chestnut, Nicholson, and Rochester Avenues.

It ran from 1899 to 1906, as an immediate success and one of the world's first full-time amusement parks. It featured a Shoot-the-Chutes ride (called the Mystic Chute), and had a beer garden with beer piped directly from the brewery next door. Eventually, the carefully groomed grounds were too small to sustain the park's popularity so at the end of the 1906 season, some of the rides were dismantled and moved to the new location to the south.

Much of the grounds lay neglected or abandoned for the next 19 years. In 1925, part of the plot (near the corner of Montgall and Rochester) was deeded to city of Kansas City for use as a neighborhood playground. Opened in an August 1, 1925, ceremony, one month before the close of the second Kansas City Electric Park the park offered "Pet Night", in which children won prizes for displaying the largest, smallest, and the most deformed dog. Another day had swimsuits awarded to boys who created wood carvings from dead trees.

== Second park ==
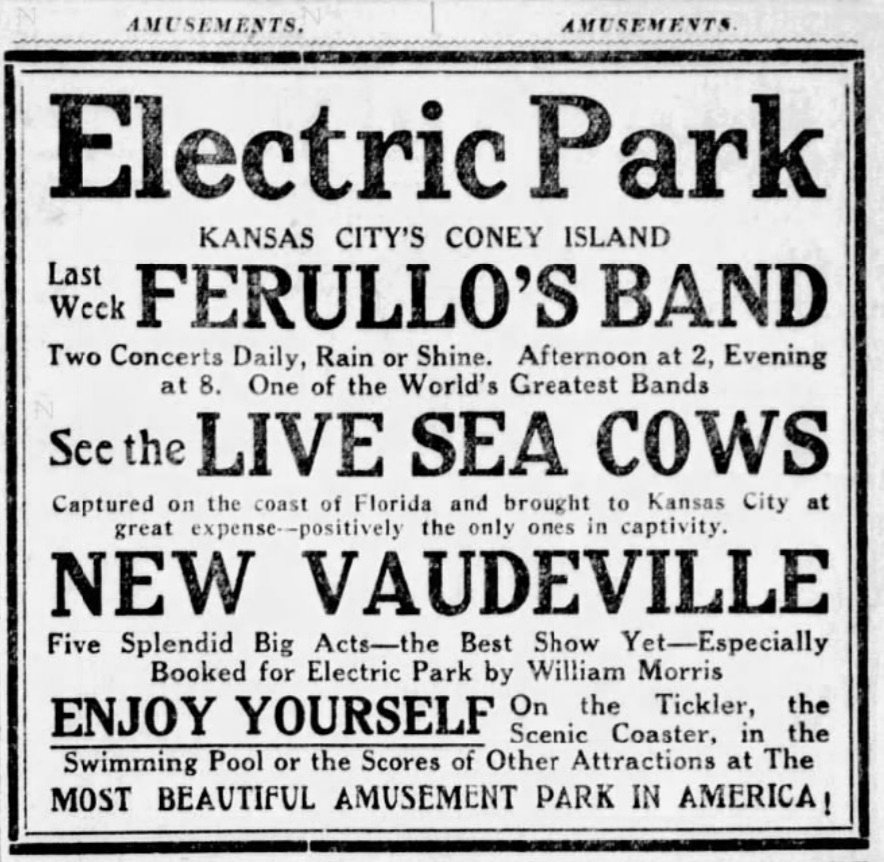
The Kansas City Star advertised the second Electric Park, Fairmount Park, and Forest Park on June 6, 1909.

The second Kansas City Electric Park, at 46th Street and the Paseo, opened May 19, 1907. It, too, was a trolley park, and was served by the Troost Avenue, Woodland Avenue, and Rockhill lines of the Metropolitan Street Railway Company, There were several unrelated amusement parks in the country named Electric Park, but the second Kansas City park was one of the largest (or the largest) one. It had "band concerts, vaudeville, Electric Fountain, ballroom, natatorium, German village, alligator farm, chutes, Dips Coaster, Norton slide, penny parlors, novelty stand, Japanese rolling ball, scenic railway, pool room, a Hale's Tour of the World, Electric Studio, boat tours, old mill, a Temple of Mirth, Flying Lady, Double Whirl, Circle Swing, soda fountain and ice cream shops, knife rack, doll rack, shooting gallery, air gun gallery, giant teeter, boating, outdoor swimming, carousel, clubhouse cafe, Casino 5 cent theater, fortune telling and palmistry, covered promenade, and horseless buggy garage". Souvenirs from the park touted it as "Kansas City's Coney Island", which it matched with 100,000 light bulbs adorning its buildings.

By 1911, the second Kansas City Electric Park attracted one million visitors, averaging 8,000 paying customers per day.

Much of the second park burned to the ground in 1925. The fire was witnessed by the young Walter Cronkite, who later wrote

Our hill overlooked, a half dozen blocks away, Electric Park...One night after closing it burned in a spectacular fire. The Ferris wheel seemed to turn as the flames climbed up its sides. The grease caught fire on the two parallel tracks of the Greyhound Racer roller coaster, and twin blazes raced up and down with the speed of the cars that once toured the tumultuous circuit...

— Walter Cronkite, A Reporter's Life (1996)

After the devastating blaze, the park maintained its operating hours as its theater and its aquarium remained open for the remainder of its last year. In the final days of 1925, Electric Park inaugurated its Coin Carnival to replace its destroyed midway. The two weeks before its final closing, Electric Park celebrated its own Mardi Gras after the Heim family decided to sell the land. On September 1, 1925, a fireworks exhibition punctuated the park's last closing ceremony.

== Walt Disney ==
After Elias Disney moved his family to Kansas City in 1911, the nine-year-old Walt and his younger sister Ruth became regular visitors to the second Electric Park, which was 15 blocks from their new home at 3028 Bellefontaine Street. The Kansas City park was inspired by the original White City in the 1893 Columbian Exposition (for which Elias was a construction worker), and Walt later took many features of the Kansas City Electric Park (including a train whose track ringed the park grounds and the daily fireworks at closing time) and incorporated them into Disneyland when he started developing the plans for the layout of the park that he opened in 1955.

Unlike many of its contemporaries, the Electric Park's grounds were meticulously maintained with landscaping designed to accentuate its rides and other attractions, a trait that Disney insisted to be maintained in Disneyland. Electric Park's "Living Statuary"'s electric procession featured young women emerging from a fountain onto a platform while bathed in various colored lights. Disney's entrances featured structures similar in design and structure to that of Electric Park's Monkey Cage Gazebo. Most of the attractions in Disney's childhood park had similar counterparts in the California park that he opened three decades later.
