= List of sirens made by Federal Signal =

Federal Signal Corporation is an American safety signal and siren manufacturer. They produce various siren models.

== Currently produced models ==
=== Federal Signal Modulator ===
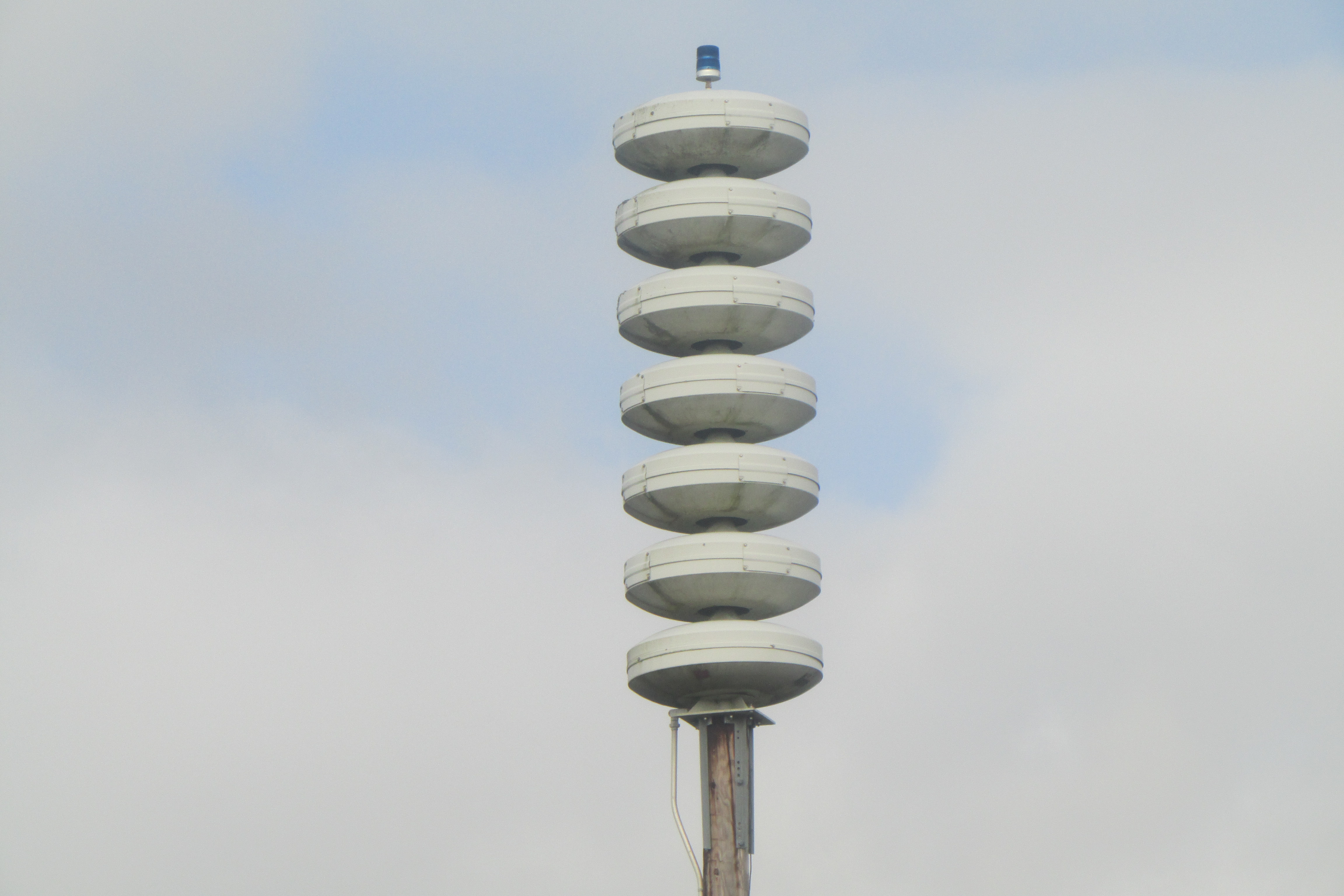
A Modulator in Long Beach.

The Modulator (alternatively called the Modulator Speaker Arrays) is an electronic siren manufactured by Federal Signal.

=== Federal Signal Model 2 ===
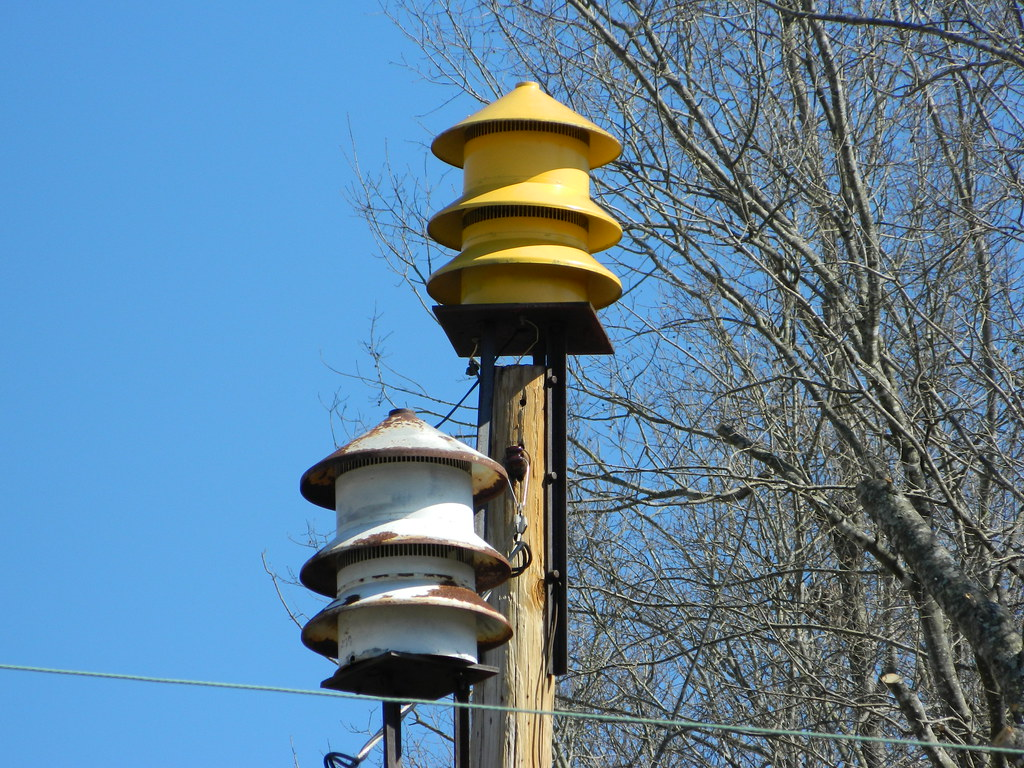
A Model 2 (left) and a Model 2T (right)

The Model 2 is an omnidirectional electromechanical siren that has been in production since 1929, and is one of the oldest sirens still produced by Federal signal.

== Discontinued models ==
=== Federal Signal Thunderbolt ===
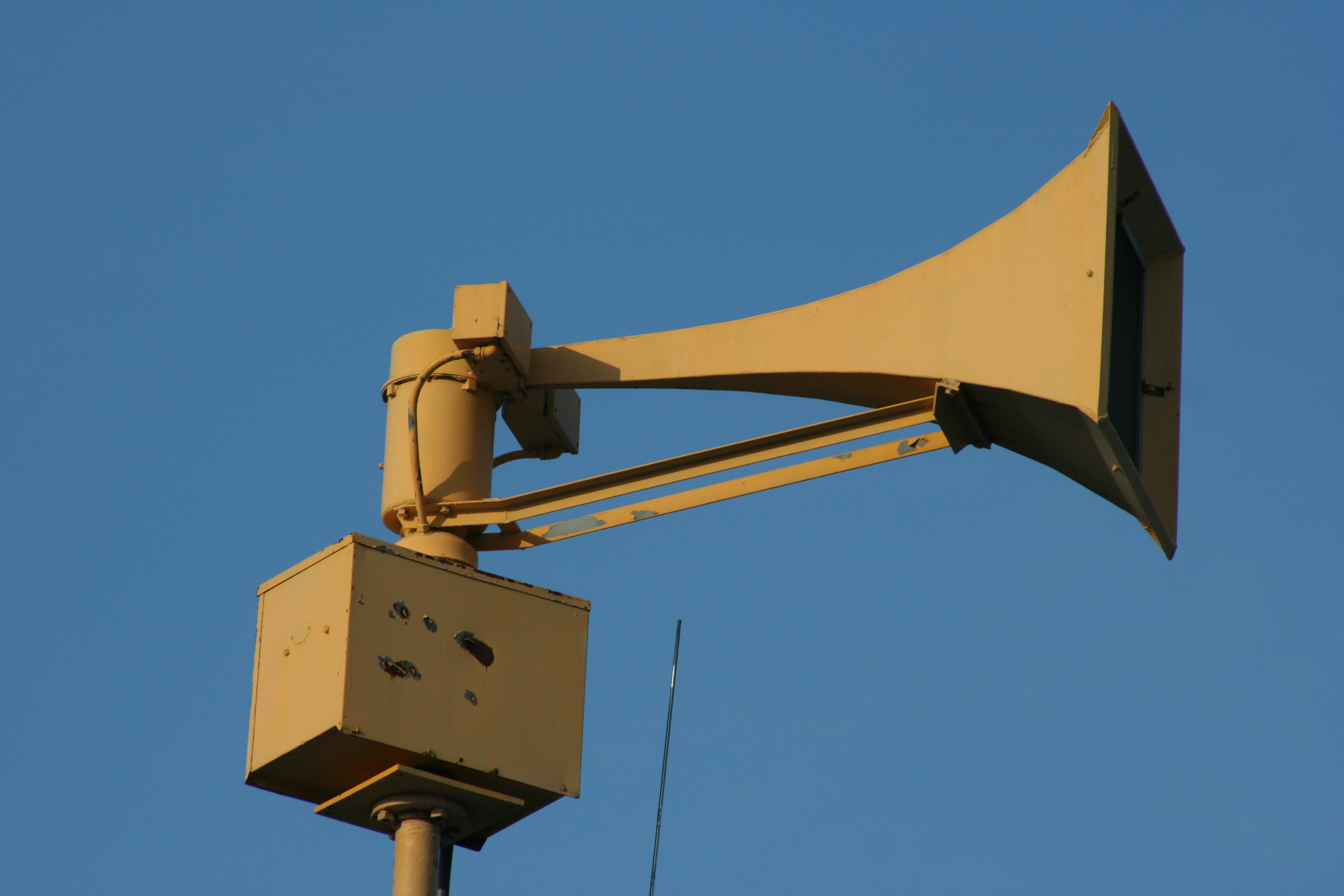
A Thunderbolt 1003 siren.

The Thunderbolt was a rotational electromechanical siren that was produced from 1952 to 1990.

=== Federal Signal 3T22/2T22 ===
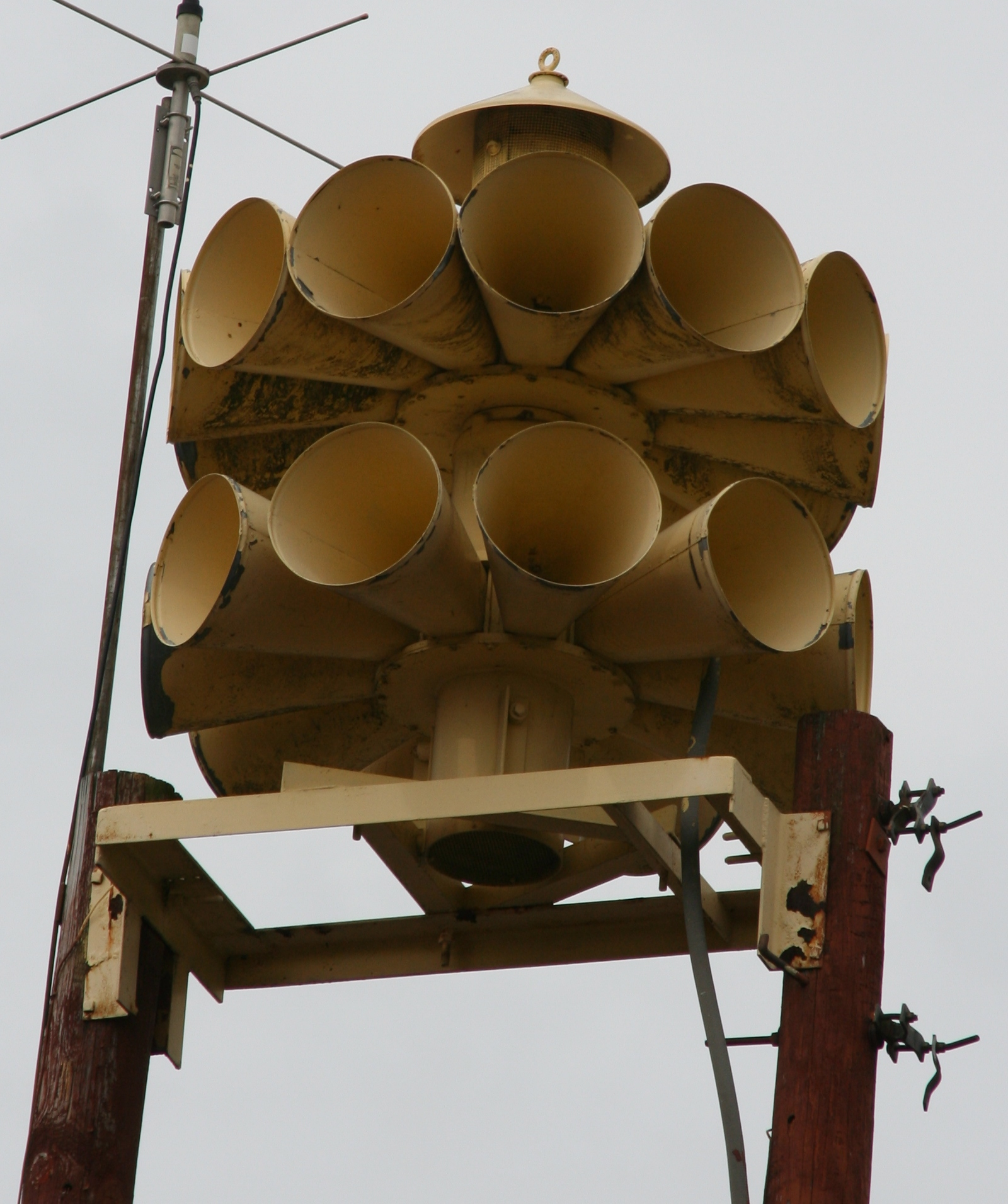
A 2T22 siren.

The 2T22/3T22 were omnidirectional sirens produced from 1952 until sometime in the 1990s. The 3T22 has a damper that allows it to produce a Hi-Lo signal.

=== SiraTone EOWS series ===
The SiraTone series (also known as the EOWS series) were a series of rotational and omnidirectional sirens that were produced sometime in the 1980's (Note: The actual production period is up to debate. There have been no significant sources explaining the exact start of production and retirement.) until the introduction of the Modulator.

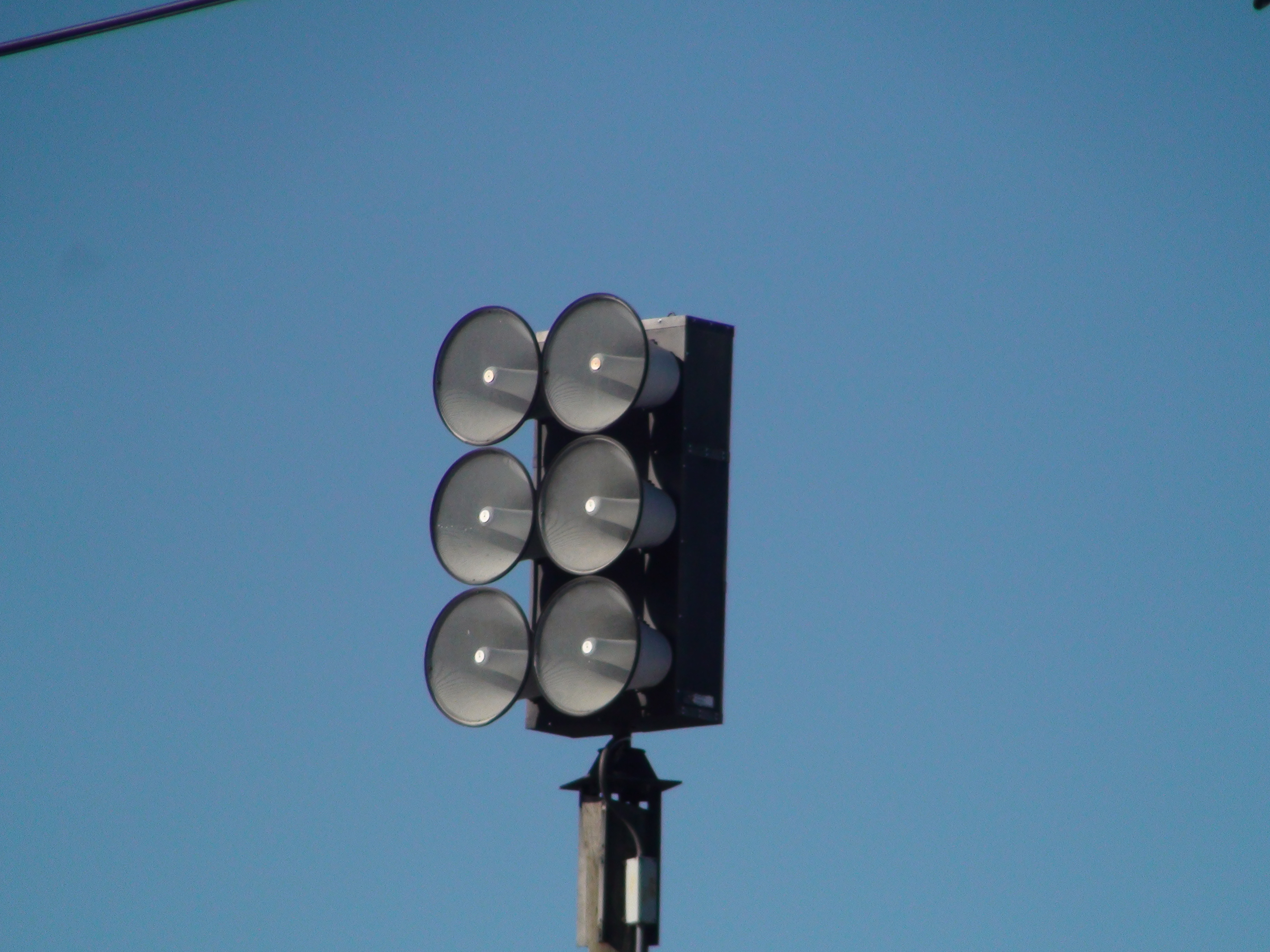
EOWS *612

==== Models produced ====
Six primary models of outdoor warning sirens were produced under the SiraTone brand. Model numbers are designated by the prefix EOWS (Electronic Outdoor Warning Siren), followed by an asterisk and a number representing the siren's power output or speaker configuration. All models utilize re-entrant speaker horns, arrays of 100-watt speaker drivers, and electronic tone generation.

- EOWS*115 – The first SiraTone model produced; a 1200-watt omnidirectional siren equipped with 12 vertical Atlas Sound CJ-44 speaker horns.
- EOWS*1212 – A 1200-watt omnidirectional siren and updated version of the EOWS*115, using 12 circular University Sound DR-42 speaker horns.
- Prototype EOWS 1212 – A prototype version of the 1212 with minor design differences, utilizing 12 Atlas CJ-44 speaker horns.
- EOWS*408 – An 800-watt rotating siren with 4 circular University Sound DR-42 speaker horns; discontinued along with the EOWS*812 in favor for the EOWS*612.
- EOWS*612 – A 1200-watt rotating siren with 6 circular University Sound DR-42 speaker horns; the most widely produced model in the SiraTone series.
- EOWS*812 – A 1200-watt rotating siren with 8 circular University Sound DR-42 speaker horns; later discontinued and effectively replaced by the EOWS*612.

A mobile, vehicle-mounted variant known as the EOWS*M12 was also proposed, though it is believed that few or none were manufactured.

== See also ==
- Federal Signal Corporation
- American Signal Corporation
- Civil defense siren
