= ACA Cyclone =

Civil Defense siren

The ACA Cyclone is an electro-mechanical, omnidirectional, dual-tone outdoor warning siren produced from 1968 to 2007 by Alerting Communicators of America (ACA). Originally intended for civil defense purposes, early versions of the Cyclone are rated at 120 dB from 100 ft, and later models are rated at 125 dB.

== History ==
The ACA Cyclone was designed by James E. Biersach of Alerting Communicators of America and presented at a Civil Defense convention in November 1968. It was originally rated at 120 dB at 100 feet, but was eventually redesigned to the point of reaching 125 dB at 100 feet. It utilizes a 40 HP motor (120) or 50 HP motor (125) due to the drag-heavy rotor design. The rotor consists of a "double intake" design, which is believed to have been inspired by Federal's 500 SH-TT siren rotor.

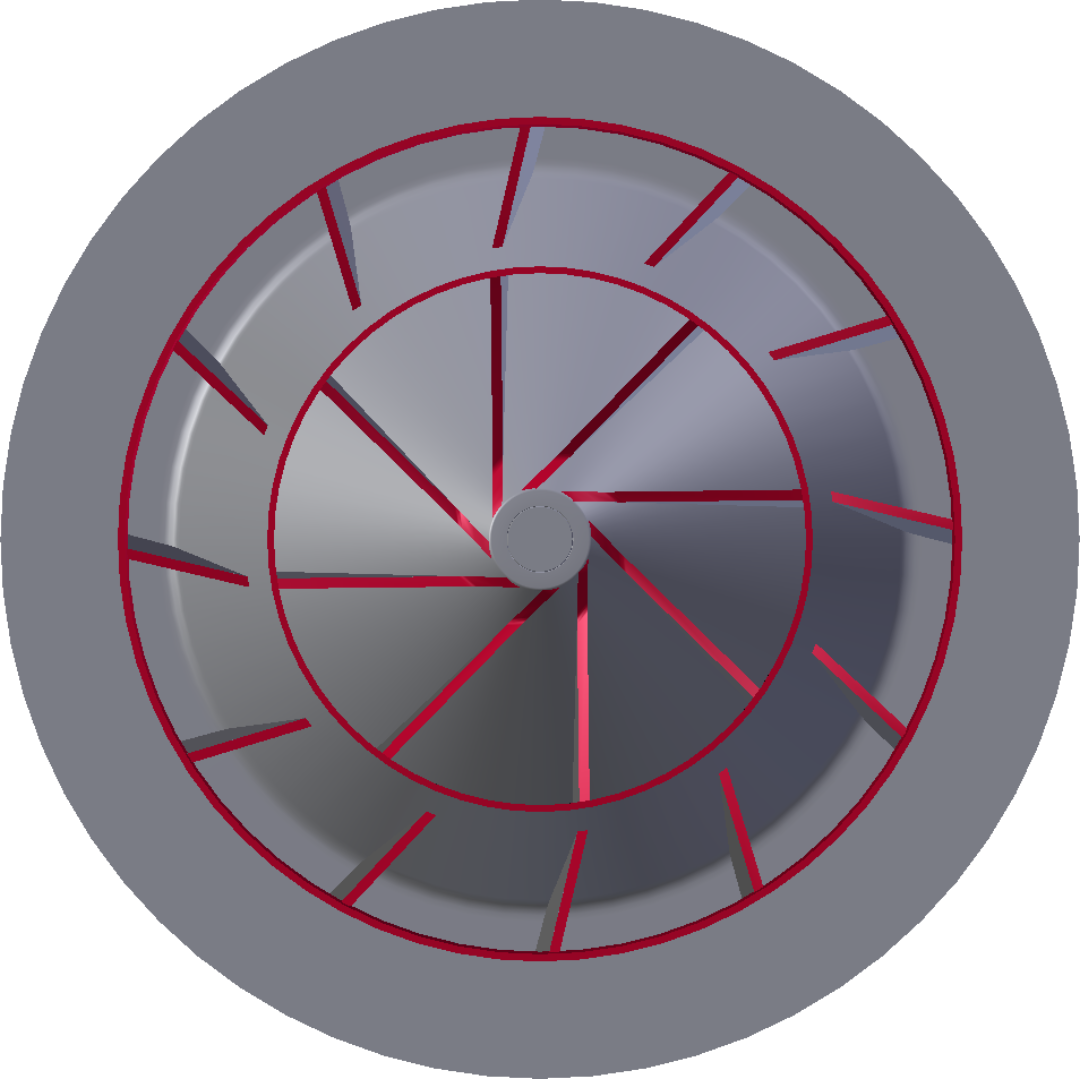
Cyclone siren rotor

The first version, the 1968 Cyclone 120, had both rows of ports angled downwards. Like some of the other 1968 ACA siren designs, it was changed shortly after to improve performance. These improvements included a new, simple intake, and most notably the top row of ports being straightened out, as to direct the low tone outwards for maximum range while projecting the high tone downwards to the immediate area. At some point afterwards we also saw the use of the long, curved intake as seen on their 3 signal sirens. This allowed for an optional coding damper to be added, which produced a pulsating "local code" tone.

In 1979, ACA was experimenting with the design of the Cyclone 120 to try and get the best performance possible. This included a slightly re-designed top cover, and a ring placed around the bottom of the stator to direct the sound outwards more smoothly. In 1980, this design was scrapped, and ACA unveiled the Cyclone 125, which came fitted with a new intake, a sound dispersion cone in the intake, and most notably a parallel stator, projecting both the high tone and low tone outwards. This was further assisted by a lip or "ring" added to the top cover of the siren. At this time, ACA unveiled the Penetrator-50, a 135 dB rotating siren which replaced the Hurricane 130. The P-50 reused the rotor and stator of the Cyclone 120, and was produced alongside the Cyclone 125 until the early 2000s when both sirens were discontinued in favor of more modern sirens.

== Technical information ==
Years	Type	Motor HP	Rotor/Stator interval	Notes
1968–1970	Cyclone 120	40 HP	8-12 port	Stator with angled bottom-row ports
1970–1980	Cyclone 120	40, 50 HP	8-12 port	Stator with angled bottom-row ports, larger intake. Allowed for a 3-signal coding mechanism
1980-1995	Cyclone 125	50 HP	8-12 port	Parallel stator, Redesigned Intake, later in 1990s Skirted Option was available using Banshee bottom Skirt
1995-2007	OM-125-AC / C-125-AC	50 HP	8-12 port	Parallel Stator, Redesigned Intake, Skirted versions now using OM-120 Bottom skirts

Cyclone locations
Town	Type	Amount	Status
Hereford, TX	125	7	Active
Bunceton, MO	120	1	Removed, Replaced by 2T22
Carrollton, MO	120	1	Active
Cheyenne, WY	120	4	Removed, some units were 50HP Powered. Replaced by 2001's
Toluca, IL	120	1	Removed; replaced by 2 14Vs.
New Richland, MN	120	1	Removed, Replaced by Eclipse-8 after it was struck by lightning, sold on auction
Eldon, MO	120	1	Inactive
Nekoosa, WI	125	1	Active, Previously Inactive due to radio issues
Philadelphia, PA	125	1	Removed, replaced by a federal signal sth 10
Harrisburg, PA	125	60	Removed. Three Mile Island Nuclear, two units remain inactive.
Gore, OK	125	1	Inactive. Ex-Sequoyah Fuels
Newkirk, OK	125	1	Active. Reverse wired
Boynton, OK	125	1	Active
Bensenville, IL	125	3	Active
Contra Costa County, CA	125	9	Active, most used for Chevron Richmond Refinery
Citrus County, FL	125	Unknown	Removed, original location unknown. Now in private possession
Orangeburg, SC	125	3	Active. SI Group sirens
Williams Bay, WI	125	1	Inactive
Park Falls, WI	125	2	Active
Howards Grove, WI	125	1	Active
Kiel, WI	125	2	Active, one was replaced by ASC AT-121
Campbellsport, WI	125	1	Active
La Farge, WI	125	1	Active
Somerset, WI	125	1	Active, optional 3-signal coding damper equipped
Waupun, WI	125	3	Removed, replaced by Federal Signal 508-128's
Cedarburg, WI	125	5	Removed, replaced by T-121's
Columbus, NE	125	3	Removed
Two Rivers, NE	125	1	Removed, replaced by T-128. Kewaunee Nuclear Power Plant
Two Creeks, WI	125	1	Removed, originally replaced an ACA Hurricane, was replaced by T-128. Kewaunee Nuclear Power Plant
Mequon, WI	125	6	Removed, replaced by T-135's
Amarillo, TX	125	8	Removed, some replaced by FS 508-128's
Canyon, TX	125	1	Inactive
Oyster Creek Nuclear Generating Station, NJ	125	31	All but one were removed, and all were replaced with ASC T-128s in 2013 after many of the sirens failed to sound for a warning during Superstorm Sandy. Only 1 remains located in Seaside Park, NJ.
Seaside Park, NJ	125	1	Unknown status; was used as a siren for the Oyster Creek Nuclear Generating Station until it was replaced in 2005 (date is unconfirmed) with an ASC T-121 and then an ASC T-128 in 2013. Control of the ACA Cyclone 125 was reportedly given to Seaside Park and remains there today.
Beach Haven, NJ	125	1	Disconnected, former Coast Guard siren
Alpha, NJ	125	1	Removed in mid to late July 2007. Installed between 1992 and 1997 and placed near the ramp between Rt. 78 and Snydersville Rd. Used and owned by Merrill Creek Reservoir for emergencies.
Quinton, NJ	125	1	Removed and replaced by ASC T-121 in 2006. Was a part of the Hope Creek Nuclear Power Plant and was skirted.
Salem, NJ	125	2	Both were removed and replaced by ASC T-121 in 2006. Was a part of the Hope Creek Nuclear Power Plant and was skirted.
Bridgeton, NJ	125	1	Removed and replaced by ASC T-121 in 2006. Was a part of the Hope Creek Nuclear Power Plant and was skirted.
Lower Alloways Creek, NJ	125	1	Removed and replaced by ASC T-121 in 2006. Was a part of the Hope Creek Nuclear Power Plant and was skirted.
Pennsville, NJ	125	1	Removed and replaced by ASC T-121 in 2006. Was a part of the Hope Creek Nuclear Power Plant and was skirted.
New Castle, DE	125	1	Removed and replaced by ASC T-121 in 2006. Was a part of the Hope Creek Nuclear Power Plant and was skirted.
Maine Yankee Nuclear Power Plant, MA	125's	Unknown	Removed, were mentioned in an A.C.A. Demonstration Tape
Clydach, Wales U.K.	125	1	Removed, only cyclone in the entire European continent, possibly scrapped. Was used in the Clydach Refinery plant as an early warning siren or a chemical spill siren, specifics are not known. The siren ran on a 50 Hz power source.
Riyadh, Saudi Arabia	120 Coded	24 According to very old documents and government contracts	Removed, was used in the Gulf War in 1991. Sounded pulse during attacks. Approximate locations unknown. Date installed around 1982-1983, remains to be the second known coded ACA Cyclone 120 in another country other than the United States of America.
Taiwan	125 modified	7 confirmed	Part of the Early Warning System in Taiwan used to warn of the possible nationwide attack, specifics are unknown. But seems to be that they have an 8 port small cyclone and a standard 8/12 port cyclone, usually mounted in pairs or with Electronic Sirens.
