= American Signal Corporation =

Outdoor warning siren and mass notification company

- Type: Private
- Industry: Public safety
- Predecessor: Alerting Communicators Of America
- Founded: 1873
- Headquarters: Milwaukee, Wisconsin, U.S.
- Key people: James E Biersach, Dale Moeller, President & CEO.
- Services: Computer Systems; Mass Notification Systems
- Website: http://www.americansignal.com

American Signal Corporation (ASC) is an outdoor warning siren and mass notification company in the United States. ASC was founded in 1873 as Biersach and Niedermeyer (B&N). After performing poorly, the company reformed as Alerting Communicators of America (ACA) in 1968, and expanded the line of warning systems they produced. In 1992, ACA went bankrupt and was bought and reformed as the American Signal Corporation.

== History ==
=== Biersach and Niedermeyer Co. ===
The company began as Biersach and Niedermeyer Co. in 1873 as a metal fabricating operation based in Milwaukee, Wisconsin. After the 1941 attack on Pearl Harbor, concerns surfaced that the public should be notified in the event of air attacks. The United States Department of the Army granted the company a contract to manufacture outdoor warning sirens, and in 1942, the company began production of over 2,000 sirens to be installed throughout the Pacific Theater for American troops and Air Bases. The need for these outdoor warnings increased during the following years as the Cold War brought a new threat of nuclear war. Three models were produced: the first two, the BN52 and BN54, were powered by a 25HP Wisconsin air-cooled engine. The later BN44E was instead powered by an electric motor. Most surviving BN54 models were later converted to use electric motors as the gasoline engines were not practical for normal use.

=== Alerting Communicators of America ===
In 1968, Biersach & Niedermeyer Co. was faced with dwindling sales of their flagship Mobil Directo series due to competition from a wide variety of Federal Electric (known as Federal Signal) models that saturated the market. They decided to split off their siren business into a new division in a bid to regain a share of sales. The company's name changed to Alerting Communicators of America (ACA), and they began production of new models to suit the needs of individual municipalities.

The Banshee, Screamer, Cyclone, Howler, and Allertor are a few of the names under which these sirens were known. In the early 1980s, the Allertor and Hurricane sirens were discontinued, succeeded by a new lineup, known as the Penetrator series. This series consisted of three models, each denoting the horsepower of their motor: P-10, P-15, and P-50. The P-10 and P-15 were sold in single tone 8 or dual tone 9/12 port configurations, but the P-10 was much more often dual tone, due to the load of the 8 port rotor tending to place undue stress on the motor, leading to burnout. The P-50, on the other hand, shared a rotor and stator assembly with the new large omnidirectional Cyclone, and was only available in an 8/12 port configuration. Also made during this time were ACA's first electronic sirens, the Alertronic series. In 1982, the company became the first in its industry to provide a wireless digital supervisory control and data acquisition (SCADA) system called CompuLert, with over 6,000 installations worldwide.

By the late 1980s, Alerting Communicators of America's golden age was nearing its end. With dwindling interest in electromechanical sirens, and skepticism over the then-new idea of electronic sirens, sales slowed. Over a five year period from 1989 to 1994, the Banshee, Screamer, Alertronic series, and Cyclone were all discontinued, while only three new models entered production: the PN-20, considered to be part of the Penetrator series, and battery backup versions of the P-15 and Banshee, known as Performance Plus. These were the last models produced by ACA.

=== American Signal Corporation ===
Their parent company, Biersach & Niedermeyer Co., went bankrupt in November 1992, and was forced to sell ACA to Hörmann GmbH, who soon reorganized the company as American Signal Corporation. Hörmann GmbH began selling their ECN/ECI sirens through ASC's market.

Over the decade, the prominent advancements the company made in its sirens' designs included battery operation, high powered Voice/Sirens, and indoor alerting systems. Similarly, designed sirens were still manufactured, but under new names, such as the Tempest series. As of 2021, ASC is still in operation and supplies many towns and cities in the U.S. with outdoor warning sirens, most of which are now used to warn the public of threats such as tsunamis, severe weather, chemical spills, and civil emergencies.

== Production models ==
=== 1940s–1960s ===
- BN52 Mobil Directo (Gasoline)
- BN54 Mobil Directo (Gasoline)
- BN44E Mobil Directo (Electric)

Watch an Allertor in the alert and attack cycle.

=== 1960s-1980s ===
- ACA Hurricane 130 (All have been removed and scrapped, except for a single example in private possession)
- ACA Hurricane MKII-130 (Only one example remains in service in Milwaukee, WI. The rest are scrapped, in private possession, in storage, or in siren graveyards)
- ACA Allertor 125 (Optional 3-signal variant, using additional motor and producing yelp tone instead of pulse/Hi-Lo)
- ACA Screamer Series (Ranging from 2 HP to 10 HP)
- ACA Banshee 110 (Optional 3-signal variant)
- ACA Banshee 115 (Optional 3-signal variant)
- ACA Super Banshee 120 (Optional 3-signal variant, having the Ability to produce a Hi-Lo Tone)
- ACA Sentry 95 (Never Made, based on the Klaxon SS6)
- ACA Cyclone 120 (Optional 3-signal variant)
- ACA Cyclone 125 (Optional 3-signal variant)

Watch a Penetrator-15 in the alert and attack cycle.

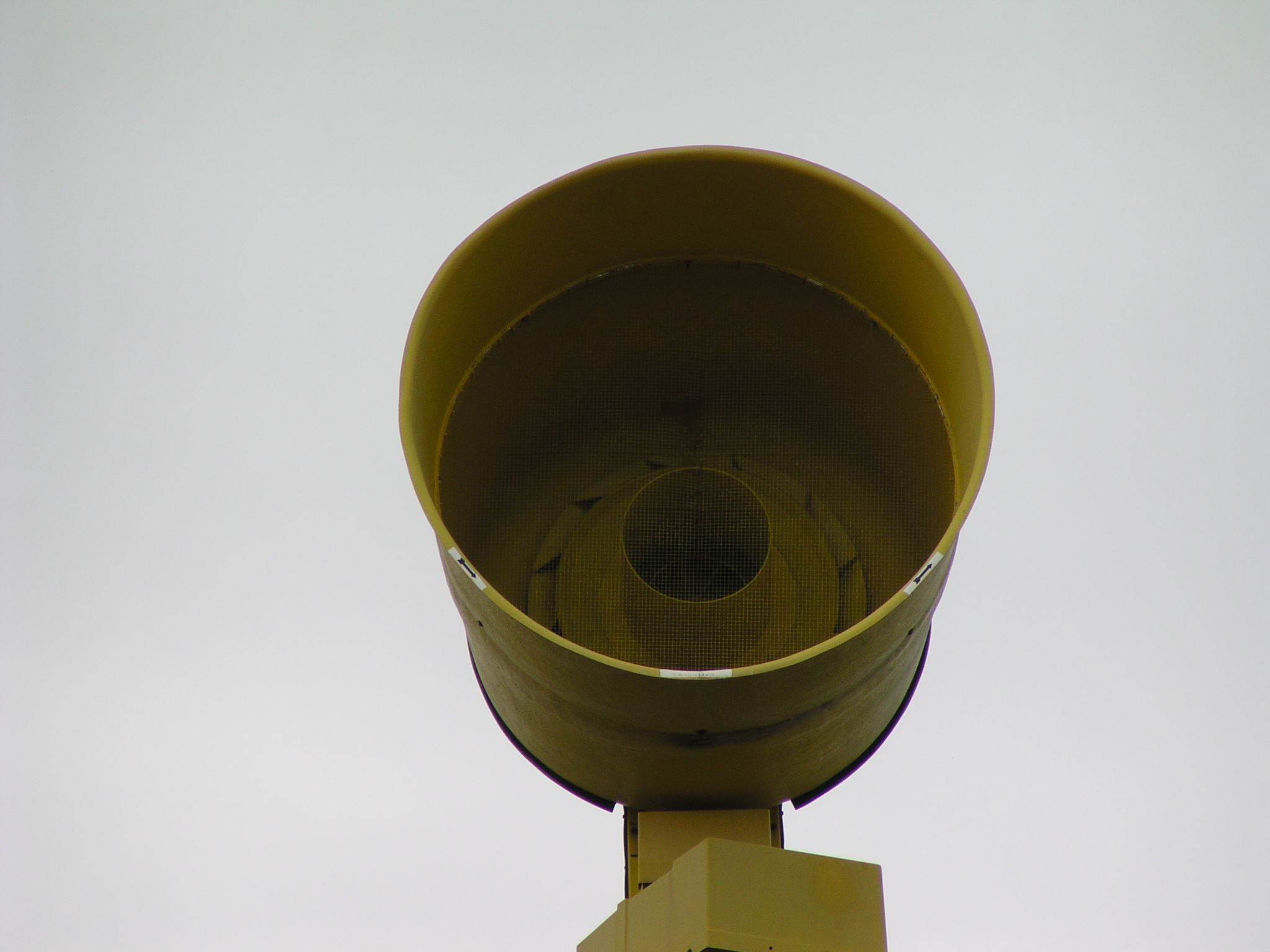
Head Shot of a P-50. The small tube is the air intake. The "fluting" around the bottom of the chopper is the air exit.

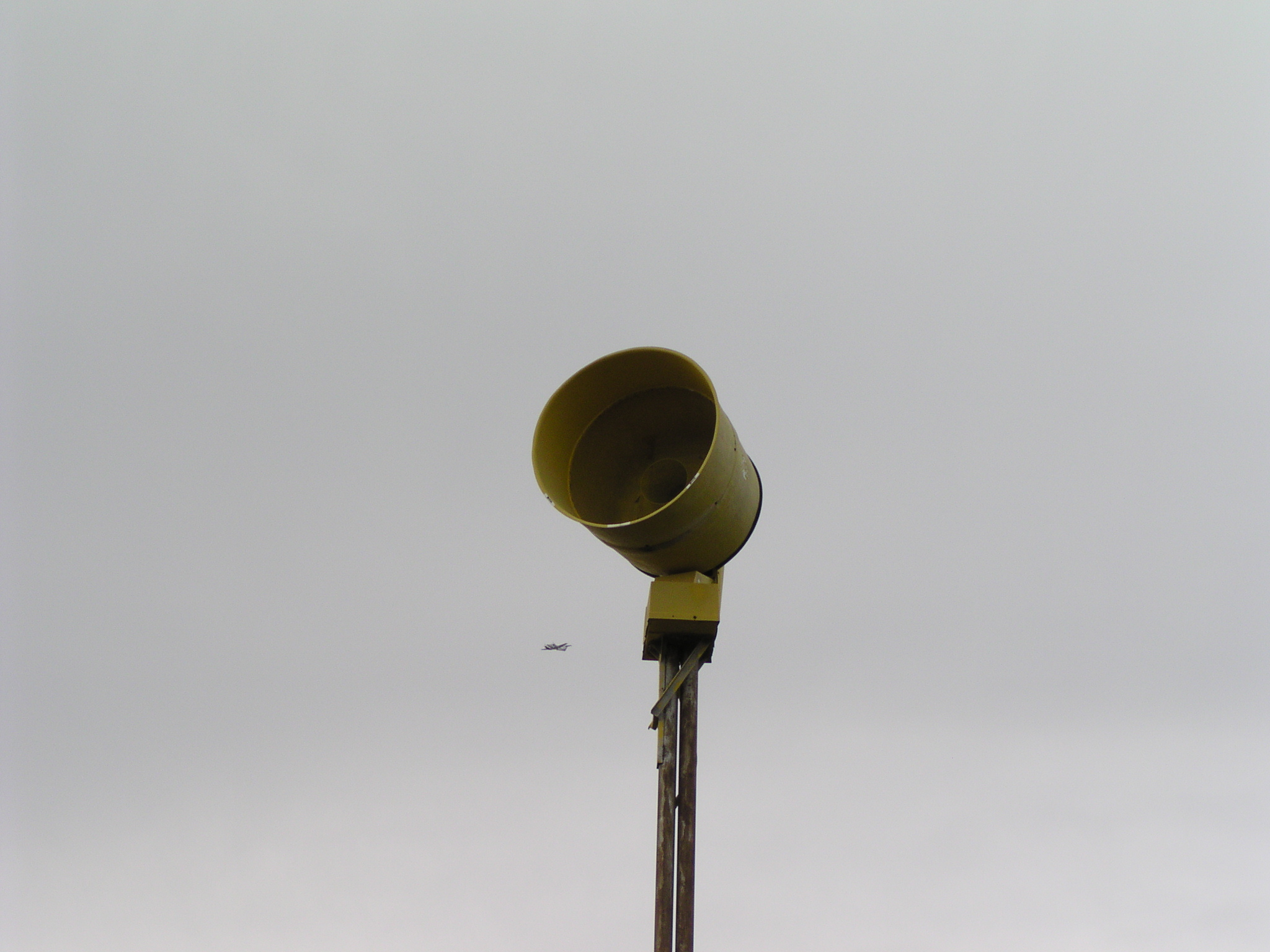
A pole mounted ACA P-50 in The Colony, TX.

=== 1980s-early 1990s ===
- ACA P-10
- ACA P-15 (optional 3-signal variant)
- ACA PN-20
- ACA P-50
- ACA Howler
- ACA Alertronic AL-6000
- ACA Alertronic AL-5000 (Only one example so far exists, at Winslow's prison, it is configured with 8 horns instead of the standard 6 horns that they came with)
- ACA Alertronic AL-1000
- ACA Alertronic AL-2000
- ACA Alertronic AL-4000
- ACA Alertronic AL-8000
- ACA Alertronic AL-7200 (1 in Tennessee)
- ACA Alertronic AL-12000 (Unknown)
- ACA Alertronic AL-6000R
- ACA Alertronic AR-1600
- ACA Quadren Q-1600
- ACA Quadren Q-3200
- ACA Quadren Q-4800

=== After bankruptcy (1992 onward) ===
After going bankrupt in November 1992 and being sold to a new owner, the company changed its name and the names of its sirens in production.

- ASC RM-127-AC (Rebranded 8 Port ACA P-15)
- ASC RM-130-AC (Rebranded ACA PN-20)
- ASC T-135-AC/RM-135-AC (Rebranded ACA P-50)
- ASC OM-117-AC(Rebranded 8 Port ACA Banshee-115)
- ASC OM-120-AC (Rebranded Performance Plus Banshee)
- ASC OM-125-AC (Rebranded ACA Cyclone-125)
- ASC Alertronic RE-1600
- ASC Alertronic AL-1000
- ASC Alertronic AL-2000
- ASC Alertronic AL-4000
- ASC Alertronic AL-8000
- Quadren (only standing examples remain at a plant in Tennessee)
- ASC I-Force STI-800
- ASC I-Force STI-1600
- ASC I-Force STI-2400
- ASC I-Force STI-3200

=== Current products ===
The Tempest siren line is the current mechanical siren line.

- ASC T-112
- ASC T-121
- ASC T-128
- ASC T-135-AC/DC

These are the electronic speaker array sirens currently produced by the company.

- ASC E-Class Public Address Speaker Array
- ASC iForce Modular Array
- ASC Clarity Modular Array
