= Palisades Nuclear Generating Station =

Nuclear power plant in Van Buren County, Michigan

Palisades Nuclear Power Plant
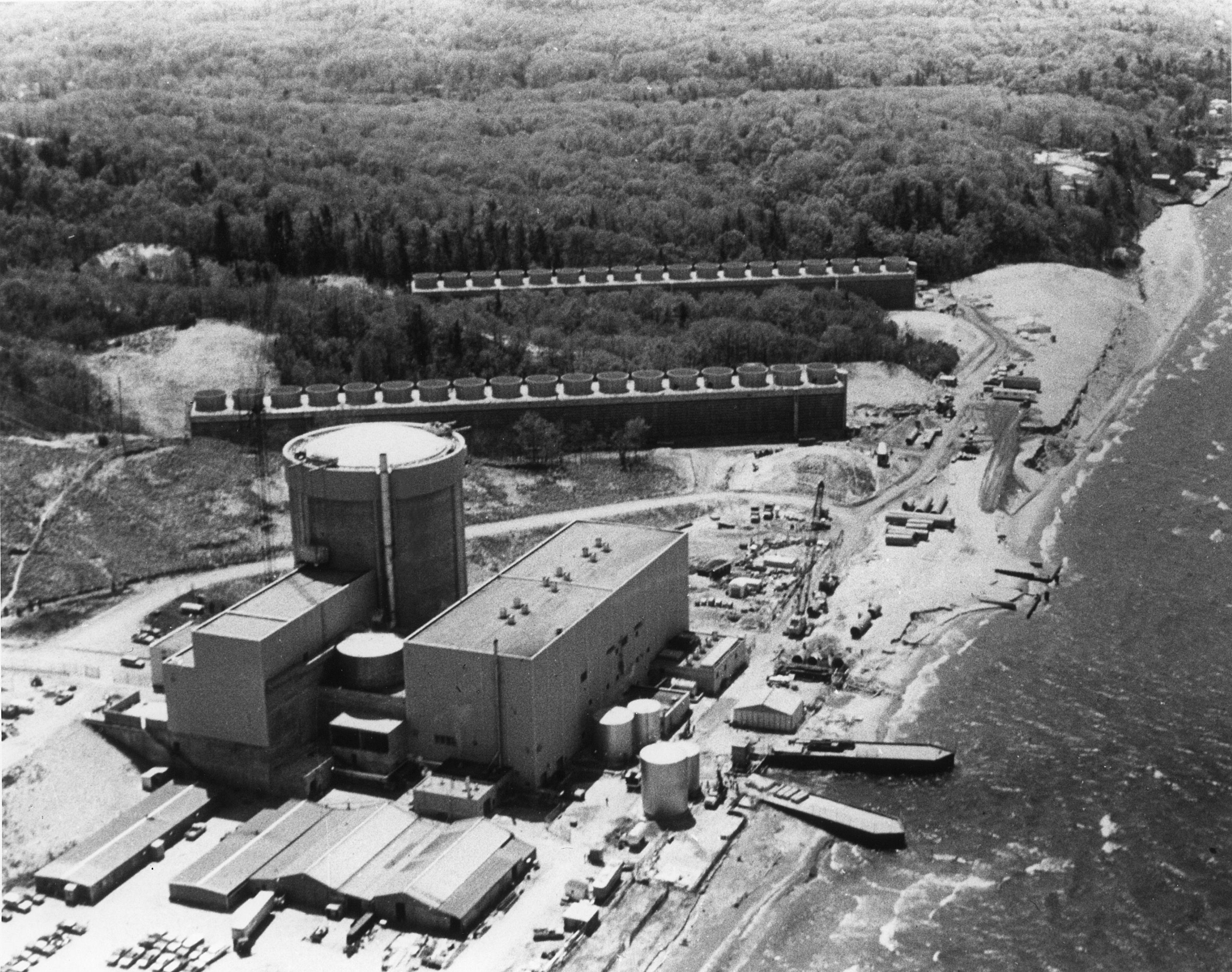
- Palisades Power Plant in 1974
- Official name: Palisades Power Plant
- Country: United States
- Location: Covert Township, Van Buren County, Michigan
- Coordinates: 42°19′22″N 86°18′52″W
- Status: Operational
- Construction began: March 12, 1967
- Commission date: December 29, 1971
- Decommission date: May 20, 2022 (Permanent shutdown - being reversed)
- Construction cost: $630 million (2007 USD) ($941 million in 2025 dollars)
- Owner: Holtec International
- Operator: Entergy Nuclear (former)

Nuclear power station
- Reactor type: PWR
- Reactor supplier: Combustion Engineering
- Cooling towers: 2 × mechanical draft cooling towers (Note: 1 × Ecodyne 18-cell cross-flow induced draft cooling tower, and 1 × SPX Marley 16-cell cross-flow induced draft tower. The plant originally used a once-through cooling system, but it was converted to the current closed-cycle cooling system just three years after entering commercial operation.)
- Cooling source: Lake Michigan
- Thermal capacity: 1 × 2565 MW_{th}

Power generation
- Units operational: 1 × 805 MW_{e}
- Make and model: CE 2-loop (DRYAMB)
- Units planned: 2 × 340 MW_{e}
- Nameplate capacity: 805 MW_{e}
- Capacity factor: 99.2% (2021); 72.2% (lifetime)
- Annual net output: 7,014 GWh (2021)

External links
- Website: Palisades Power Plant (plant page); Palisades Power Plant (plant site)
- Commons: Related media on Commons

The Palisades Nuclear Generating Station is a nuclear power plant located on Lake Michigan, in Van Buren County's Covert Township, Michigan, on a 432-acre (175 ha) site 5 miles (8.0 km) south of South Haven, Michigan, USA. Palisades was operated by the Nuclear Management Company and owned by CMS Energy prior to the sale to Entergy on April 11, 2007.

Its single Combustion Engineering pressurized water reactor weighs 425 tons and has steel walls 8 1/2 inches (220 mm) thick. The containment building is 116 feet (35 m) in diameter and 189 feet (58 m) tall, including the dome. Its concrete walls are 3 1/2 feet (1.1 m) thick with a 1/4-inch-thick (6.4 mm) steel liner plate. The dome roof is 3 feet (0.91 m) thick. Access is via a personnel lock measuring 3 feet 6 inches (1.07 m) by 7 feet 8 inches (2.34 m). The Westinghouse Electric Company turbine generator can produce 725,000 kilowatts of electricity.

Built between 1967 and 1970, Palisades was approved to operate at full power in 1973.

On April 11, 2007, the plant was sold to Entergy for $380 million. The plant's original license was due to expire on March 24, 2011. An application for 20-year extension was filed in 2005 with the Nuclear Regulatory Commission. It was granted on January 18, 2007. Therefore, the plant was then scheduled for decommissioning by 2031.

Entergy initially decided to close the plant in October 2018 following Consumers Energy's attempt to buy its way out of a power purchase agreement it had with Entergy and the plant. The Michigan Public Service Commission (MPSC) did not approve Consumer Energy's full request of $172 million, so Entergy decided to keep the plant open three years longer than planned. On April 20, 2022, just weeks before the facility was scheduled to close, Michigan governor Gretchen Whitmer requested federal funding to keep the facility open.

Entergy closed the Palisades plant in May 2022 and its sale to Holtec International was completed in June 2022. However, in September 2022, Holtec applied for funds from the Civil Nuclear Credit Program to reopen the plant. This request was denied in November 2022. In December 2022, Holtec announced that it would reapply for the Civil Nuclear Credit in order to restart Palisades. On September 12, 2023, Holtec and Wolverine Power Cooperative announced that they had reached a power purchase agreement to restart the plant once the re-opening is approved. In August 2024, Holtec secured $300 million in state funding to restart the plant. The Department of Energy is also ready to offer a $1.5 billion loan to assist in restarting operations. If operations resume, initially planned for late 2025, the plant would be the first nuclear power plant to restart operations in the country. The plant changed its status from decommissioned to operational on August 27, 2025.

== Electricity production ==
Generation (MWh) of Palisades Power Plant
Year	Jan	Feb	Mar	Apr	May	Jun	Jul	Aug	Sep	Oct	Nov	Dec	Annual (Total)
2001	592,991	512,071	571,285	2,663	298,038	371,256	-3,857	-2,260	-2,114	-2,025	-1,979	-5,023	2,331,046
2002	168,721	535,946	600,727	576,904	577,499	537,795	582,568	568,090	545,479	591,278	565,875	507,080	6,357,962
2003	591,649	525,637	288,895	151,228	591,727	566,907	560,312	572,715	562,716	588,899	553,522	597,274	6,151,481
2004	597,162	537,116	596,098	569,271	583,466	560,078	461,033	429,413	196,447	-2,294	218,324	597,732	5,343,846
2005	397,709	541,624	598,387	574,581	590,400	562,735	581,101	576,704	497,868	583,085	559,996	579,426	6,643,616
2006	483,519	547,734	602,942	-2,481	219,549	576,782	585,700	590,628	574,389	602,582	518,820	603,697	5,903,861
2007	603,143	497,774	485,071	583,991	465,196	569,217	585,433	582,322	149,115	118,585	581,425	604,743	5,826,015
2008	541,751	566,389	607,111	579,786	556,350	567,071	582,065	486,670	567,326	595,073	581,797	603,347	6,834,736
2009	602,883	456,765	408,921	0	556,099	572,986	586,004	584,081	569,329	596,345	580,914	604,383	6,118,710
2010	605,062	546,938	593,732	562,212	594,771	445,015	523,828	579,406	556,104	52,104	581,983	599,506	6,240,661
2011	470,918	549,704	599,520	586,084	601,466	575,531	587,675	587,482	382,827	558,063	579,535	562,215	6,641,020
2012	520,384	560,994	559,117	70,773	337,644	223,603	379,584	232,642	572,715	598,924	516,978	604,855	5,178,213
2013	601,801	406,300	601,233	582,500	78,941	240,832	586,088	586,335	570,971	594,112	584,273	608,310	6,041,696
2014	352,746	0	279,059	590,296	603,606	447,510	591,671	587,580	575,159	601,553	586,902	606,844	5,822,926
2015	608,486	548,730	608,445	585,160	592,832	570,012	585,747	578,292	245,693	207,366	583,569	604,188	6,318,520
2016	604,084	567,887	606,693	585,596	594,084	570,444	583,080	583,768	568,757	595,017	580,097	605,674	7,045,181
2017	606,167	546,327	410,108	246,708	153,022	573,633	592,094	591,359	576,289	601,210	589,536	611,043	6,097,496
2018	611,065	552,287	507,808	589,980	602,254	573,853	591,112	585,875	576,132	239,649	0	25,925	5,455,940
2019	490,769	549,023	608,203	587,459	603,692	577,448	506,100	575,922	572,336	600,323	587,265	606,627	6,865,167
2020	607,199	567,646	606,475	585,434	600,016	570,882	583,761	512,269	0	170,462	584,075	606,904	5,995,123
2021	607,642	548,387	607,009	585,761	600,744	572,711	553,246	577,453	571,543	596,151	586,434	607,718	7,014,799
2022	608,772	549,352	607,781	586,628	377,697	0	0	0	0	0	0	0	2,730,230

== Spent fuel storage ==
Spent fuel is stored outdoors in 21 16-foot-tall (4.9 m) storage casks, each containing 30 tons and resting on a concrete pad. This was intended to be a temporary solution until the spent fuel repository at Yucca Mountain nuclear waste repository opened.

== Parts replacement ==
Two steam generators were replaced in 1992. This involved cutting a 28 by 26 foot opening through the 3.5-foot-thick (1.1 m) reinforced concrete wall. The removed units are stored in a large concrete building on plant property.

== Surrounding population ==
The Nuclear Regulatory Commission defines two emergency planning zones around nuclear power plants: a plume exposure pathway zone with a radius of 10 miles (16 km), concerned primarily with exposure to, and inhalation of, airborne radioactive contamination, and an ingestion pathway zone of about 50 miles (80 km), concerned primarily with ingestion of food and liquid contaminated by radioactivity.

The 2010 U.S. population within 10 miles (16 km) of Palisades was 28,644, a decrease of 4.5 percent in a decade, according to an analysis of U.S. Census data for msnbc.com. The 2010 U.S. population within 50 miles (80 km) was 1,326,618, an increase of 4.4 percent since 2000. Cities within 50 miles include South Bend, Indiana (45 miles to city center) and Kalamazoo, Michigan.

== Seismic risk ==
The Nuclear Regulatory Commission's estimate of the risk each year of an earthquake intense enough to cause core damage to the reactor at Palisades was 1 in 156,250, according to an NRC study published in August 2010.

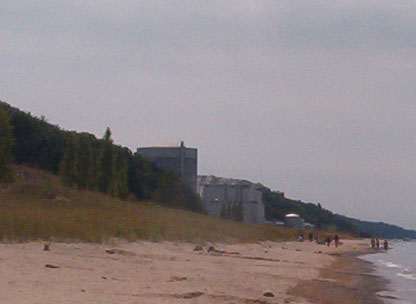
View from Van Buren State Park

== Visiting ==
Like all U.S. nuclear power plants since September 11, 2001, public access to Palisades is prohibited. However, Palisades can be glimpsed from the neighboring Van Buren State Park.

== Decommissioning ==
Originally planned to operate through May 31, 2022, concerns over a faulty control rod drive seal prompted operators to remove the plant from service on May 20.

Once all fuel is removed from the reactor core, Holtec will buy the plant from Entergy and begin a three year process of moving all fuel to dry cask storage. Then a ten-year pause to allow the decommissioning trust fund balance to grow followed by a 6 year long dismantling process, with an estimated completion date of 2041.

The cost of decommissioning will be covered by a $550-million trust fund, paid for by Consumers Energy customers.

== Intention to restart operations ==
In January 2024, the federal government was poised to offer Holtec International a $1.5 billion federal loan to restart the Palisades nuclear plant. The loan was reported at the time to potentially start as soon as February 2024. The conditional agreement was announced on March 27. If successful, Palisades would become the first U.S. nuclear reactor to restart after its fuel has been removed and its license revised to prohibit further operation. The plan for a restart by Holtec International (based in Jupiter, Florida) got a boost after Wolverine Power Cooperative, a local power company, agreed to buy as much as 2/3 of the plant’s output starting as soon as late 2025, though additional hurdles, including sign off from federal nuclear regulators, remain. Holtec acquired the 800-megawatt power plant in 2022 after Entergy Corp. closed it due to financial reasons.

The plant transitioned from decommissioned to an online status on August 27, 2025. The move allows the plant to receive nuclear fuel and begin producing electricity.

As of October 21, 2025, the Palisades plant has taken delivery of 68 nuclear fuel assemblies. Holtec has deep-cleaned the plant's reactor and generator and requalified former plant operators in preparation of restarting operations.

On October 21, 2025, a worker at the plant fell into the reactor cavity and had to be decontaminated.

=== Tilted fuel assembly incident ===
On August 30, 2026, a fuel rod assembly tilted and became bent inside the reactor during a loading procedure. This incident halted the plant’s refueling work. No injuries were reported and no radioactive material was released. Holtec submitted a request to the NRC for a one-time license amendment to allow workers to use specialized equipment to remove the damaged assembly. The company had fabricated a custom recovery tool and fuel transfer canister to move the assembly from the reactor to the spent fuel pool. The fuel assembly's upper tie plate was damaged, preventing workers from using the standard fuel handling machine grapple. On October 14, the NRC approved the one-time license amendment. The procedure involves lifting the assembly from the reactor cavity while keeping the assembly under water as long as possible, place it in a transfer canister, and move the canister to the spent fuel pool. The NRC says its review found radiation exposures and other risks would remain within safety limits.

== Small modular reactor plans ==
In December 2023, Holtec announced that it intended to build the first two of its SMR-300 small modular reactors at Palisades by mid-2030. The company submitted a partial construction permit application to the NRC in January 2026 for the two 340 MW reactors, to be built as Pioneer Units 1 and 2.

== See also ==
- List of nuclear reactors
- Nuclear energy policy of the United States
- Nuclear reactor accidents in the United States
- Energy in the United States
  - Renewable energy in the United States
