= Nuclear Management Company =

Defunct U.S. nuclear power plant operation company

Nuclear Management Company was a contract/operations firm that operated six nuclear power plants in the midwest US. NMC provided operational collaborations between plants. NMC did not own the plants, nor the energy produced from them. NMC's corporate headquarters were in Hudson, Wisconsin. As of September 2008 the operating licenses for the last two plants overseen by NMC, Monticello and Prairie Island, were transferred to Northern States Power Company (a wholly owned subsidiary of Xcel Energy), the owner of the plants. All personnel and assets of NMC were transferred to NSP, rendering NMC defunct.

== History ==
NMC was formed in February 1999 by four utilities: Alliant Energy Nuclear, NSP Nuclear Corporation, WEC Nuclear Nuclear Corporation, and WPS Nuclear Corporation. Consumers Energy joined and became an investor in 2000. Alliant Energy, WPS, WEC and Consumers Energy left NMC when they sold their nuclear plants. NSP reacquired the operating license for Monticello and Prairie Island in September 2008. At that time, the remaining NMC structure was incorporated into NSP.

The idea behind NMC was to gain synergy through operating multiple plants under different owners, emphasizing industry best practices. They implemented safety protocols such as A.C.E.M.A.N., which was a daily safety standup where every on-site person was polled A = accident free C = control dose E = event free M = meet commitments A = attend training N = No re-work

== Nuclear plants ==
- Monticello Nuclear Generating Plant

Monticello is located in Monticello, Minnesota. Monticello is owned by Northern States Power Company, now a subsidiary of Xcel Energy. MNGP is a BWR licensed through 2030.

- Palisades Nuclear Power Plant (sold in 2007)

Palisades is located in Covert Township, Michigan, along the shores of Lake Michigan. It was owned by Consumers Energy, a subsidiary of CMS Energy. On December 12, 2005, the plant was put up for auction and the sale to Entergy Corporation was completed in 2007. Palisades is a PWR licensed through 2031. The plant is now operated by Entergy.

- Point Beach Nuclear Power Plant (sold in 2007)

Point Beach is located in Two Rivers, Wisconsin. The plant was owned by We Energies, a unit of Wisconsin Energy Corporation. Point Beach is a two unit PWR, with Unit 1 licensed through 2030 and Unit 2 licensed through 2033. An agreement to sell the plant to a subsidiary of FPL Group was reached in December, 2006, and completed in 2007.

- Prairie Island Nuclear Generating Plant

Prairie Island is located in Red Wing, Minnesota. Prairie Island is also owned by NSP, now part of Xcel Energy. Prairie Island is a two unit PWR, with Unit 1 licensed through 2033 and Unit 2 licensed through 2034.

- Duane Arnold Energy Center (sold in 2006)

DAEC, located in Cedar Rapids, Iowa, is Iowa's only nuclear power plant. It was originally owned by Alliant Energy-Interstate Power and Light (70%) and two co-op utilities (30%) when NMC formed. On January 27, 2006, FPL took Alliant Energy's 70% ownership of the plant. DAEC is no longer part of NMC and is operated by FPL. DAEC is a BWR licensed through 2034.

- Kewaunee Nuclear Power Plant (sold in 2005)

Kewaunee, now closed, is located in Carlton, Wisconsin. Kewaunee was originally owned by WPS Resources, Wisconsin Public Service Corp., and 2 other partners. On July 5th, 2005, the plant was sold to Dominion Resources. Kewaunee is a PWR.
