= Kewaunee Power Station =

Decommissioned nuclear power plant located in Carlton, Wisconsin

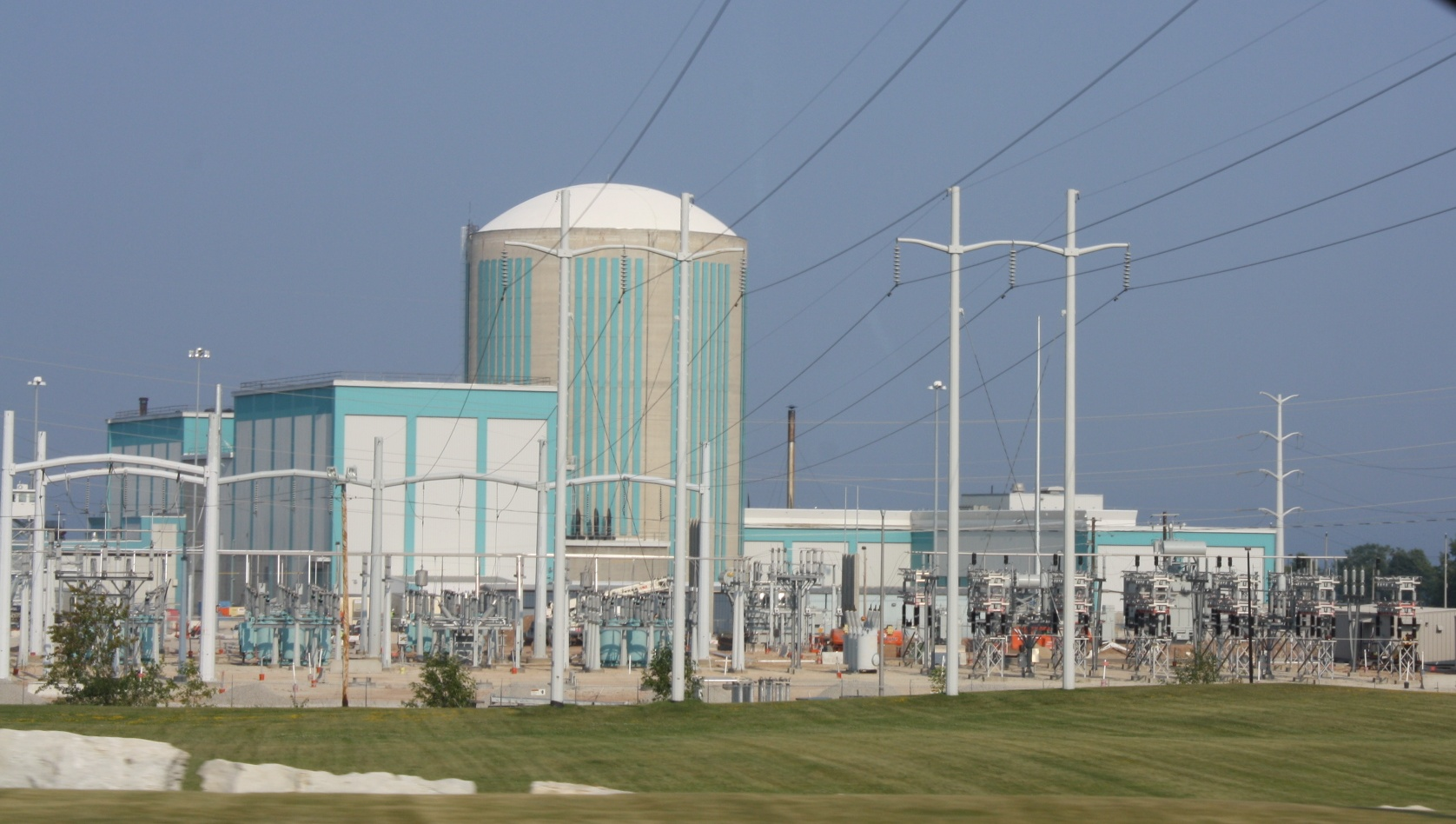
- Kewaunee Power Station
- Country: United States
- Location: Town of Carlton, Kewaunee County, near Kewaunee, Wisconsin
- Coordinates: 44°20′32″N 87°32′10″W
- Status: Decommissioned
- Construction began: August 6, 1968
- Commission date: June 16, 1974
- Decommission date: May 7, 2013
- Construction cost: $776.15 million (2007 USD) ($1.13 billion in 2024 dollars)
- Owner: EnergySolutions (As of 2022)
- Operator: EnergySolutions (Decommissioning)

Nuclear power station
- Reactor type: PWR
- Reactor supplier: Westinghouse
- Cooling source: Lake Michigan

Power generation
- Make and model: WH 2-loop (DRYAMB)
- Units decommissioned: 1 × 566 MW (1772 MW_{th})
- Nameplate capacity: 560.1 MW
- Capacity factor: 84.0% (lifetime)
- Annual net output: 3,752 GW·h (lifetime average)

External links
- Website: Kewaunee Power Station
- Commons: Related media on Commons

The Kewaunee Power Station is a partially-decommissioned nuclear power plant, located on a 900 acres (360 ha) plot in the town of Carlton, Wisconsin, 27 miles (43 km) southeast of Green Bay, Wisconsin in Kewaunee County, and south of the city of Kewaunee.

KPS was the third nuclear power plant built in Wisconsin, and the 44th built in the United States. Due to falling electricity prices resulting from the falling price of natural gas, the plant ceased operation May 7, 2013.

On January 20, 2026 a Notice of Intent (NOI) was submitted by site owners EnergySolutions to the Nuclear Regulatory Commission (NRC) confirming their intent to submit an application for major licensing action for new nuclear generation at the Kewaunee site. This initiative was first announced in May 2025 and the application is expected to be submitted in 2028.

== History ==
The plant's original operator was Wisconsin Public Service and it was owned by Wisconsin Public Service Corporation (59%) and Alliant Energy (41%). From 2000 to July 2005, the plant was operated by Nuclear Management Company, of Hudson, Wisconsin. The plant was then sold to Dominion Resources of Richmond, Virginia. In 2008, Dominion applied to the NRC for an extension of its operating license for an additional 20 years. The license was extended until 2033.

On April 27, 2006, there was a small water leak at the plant, though no radioactive material was released.

On October 22, 2012, Dominion Resources announced they would shut down and decommission the plant in mid-2013. Dominion's chairman and CEO said "the decision was based purely on economics. Dominion was not able to move forward with our plan to grow our nuclear fleet in the Midwest to take advantage of economies of scale". Lower natural gas costs and resultant lower electricity prices created an electricity market in which the plant could not compete. The plant came offline permanently on May 7, 2013. Plans for decommissioning were uncertain: as a private owner rather than a public utility, Dominion could not rely on charges imposed on utility customers by state regulators; however, the firm had a substantial reserve fund earmarked for this purpose and a cause of action against the Department of Energy for failure to remove spent fuel. There was also the chance that the energy market might improve due to economic or political changes.

The SAFSTOR (SAFe STORage) nuclear decommissioning option was selected. During SAFSTOR, the de-fuelled plant is monitored for up to sixty years before complete decontamination and dismantling of the site, to a condition where nuclear licensing is no longer required. During the storage interval, some of the radioactive contaminants of the reactor and power plant will decay, which will reduce the quantity of radioactive material to be removed during the final decontamination phase. A reduced workforce will move fuel assemblies from the reactor into the spent fuel pool.

On July 15, 2017, as part of decommissioning effort, the remaining fuel assemblies were successfully transferred to 24 Magnastor casks. Pool-to-pad work was completed in 23 weeks. The entire used fuel inventory from nearly four decades of electricity generation at Kewaunee is represented by the 24 Magnastor systems and 14 legacy Nuhoms systems.

An agreement to acquire the site and complete the decommissioning activities was reached between Dominion and EnergySolutions of Salt Lake City, UT in May 2021. EnergySolutions had previously completed the decommissioning of the La Crosse Boiling Water Reactor, Wisconsin's first commercial nuclear facility. The sale of the plant was approved by the federal government in March 2022 as well as by the Public Service Commission of Wisconsin (PSC) in June 2022. Prior plant owners WPSC and WP&L were given right of first refusal (ROFR) to repurchase the non-operational site, but both utilities waived this right during the PSC proceedings.

As of December 31, 2024, the Kewaunee Decommissioning Trust Fund (DTF) balance was $752.4M and the remaining decommissioning work was estimated at $712.8M.

Dating back to 2001, peregrine falcons nested at the facility, near the top of the containment structure. At least 53 young were produced in that time (2.4 young per year). The nest was taken over by great horned owls in 2022 and has since been deconstructed.

== Electrical production (historical) ==
Generation (MW-h) Kewaunee Power Station
Year	Jan	Feb	Mar	Apr	May	Jun	Jul	Aug	Sep	Oct	Nov	Dec	Annual (Total)
2001	374,958	338,738	360,422	374,078	366,191	338,420	368,694	365,908	271,320	0	0	303,281	3,462,010
2002	394,109	356,706	390,893	379,730	246,100	380,201	389,404	388,724	378,133	393,001	380,890	390,843	4,468,734
2003	395,017	340,614	393,504	39,977	233,410	383,826	395,677	398,345	388,429	402,479	390,525	397,324	4,159,127
2004	195,008	363,960	386,957	411,416	425,146	410,108	420,571	420,641	410,377	102,736	0	326,962	3,873,882
2005	423,459	260,001	0	0	0	0	379,656	418,940	409,354	420,601	318,793	416,484	3,047,288
2006	425,724	383,206	425,196	325,889	98,495	404,221	422,279	416,143	11,353	30,239	325,775	404,579	3,673,099
2007	359,049	364,390	288,658	411,105	421,239	391,752	421,962	419,489	411,002	300,318	411,499	425,343	4,625,806
2008	423,644	397,908	379,119	0	283,772	410,671	424,505	398,938	408,761	422,952	412,246	424,779	4,387,295
2009	421,371	382,128	421,620	355,910	421,430	406,604	418,141	417,259	328,290	105,496	411,078	425,991	4,515,318
2010	424,163	385,510	425,766	410,893	424,750	409,739	418,575	419,392	410,992	424,298	410,657	425,519	4,990,254
2011	425,146	337,897	43,300	414,002	427,498	414,764	426,933	423,274	411,659	429,032	415,130	426,120	4,594,755
2012	429,967	402,100	428,348	63,877	278,368	412,850	417,344	419,026	409,961	415,347	412,608	426,096	4,515,892
2013	425,619	384,441	425,220	411,068	87,131*	-	-	-	-	-	-	-	1,733,479

* Power station went offline (start of decommissioning phase)

== Description ==
This plant had one Westinghouse pressurized water reactor. The plant site has two 345 kV lines interconnecting to the grid with one going to We Energies North Appleton Substation located 15 miles (24 km) north of Appleton, Wisconsin and the other one interconnecting with the Point Beach Nuclear Generating Station located just a short distance away. Two 138 kV lines exit the plant which go to the Green Bay area 30 miles (48 km) away.

=== Surrounding population ===
The NRC defines two emergency planning zones around nuclear power plants: a plume exposure pathway zone with a radius of 10 miles (16 km), concerned primarily with exposure to, and inhalation of, airborne radioactive contamination, and an ingestion pathway zone of about 50 miles (80 km), concerned primarily with ingestion of food and liquid contaminated by radioactivity.

The 2010 U.S. population within 10 miles (16 km) of Kewaunee was 10,292, a decrease of 0.9 percent in a decade, according to an analysis of U.S. Census data for msnbc.com. The 2010 U.S. population within 50 miles (80 km) was 776,954, an increase of 10.1 percent since 2000. Cities within 50 miles include Green Bay (26 miles to city center).

=== Seismic risk ===
The Nuclear Regulatory Commission's estimate of the risk each year of an earthquake intense enough to cause core damage to the reactor at Kewaunee was 1 in 83,333, according to an NRC study published in August 2010.

== Gallery ==
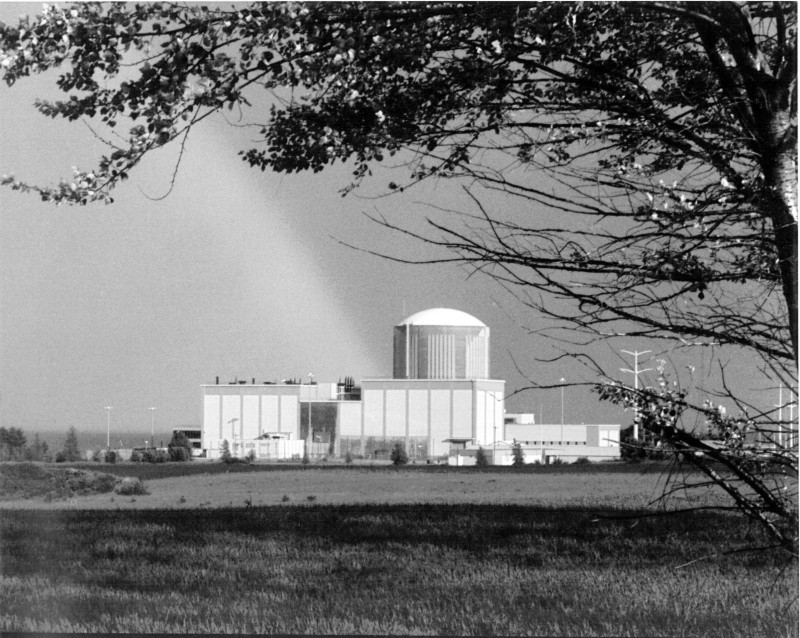
Kewaunee Power Station, Kewaunee, Wisconsin

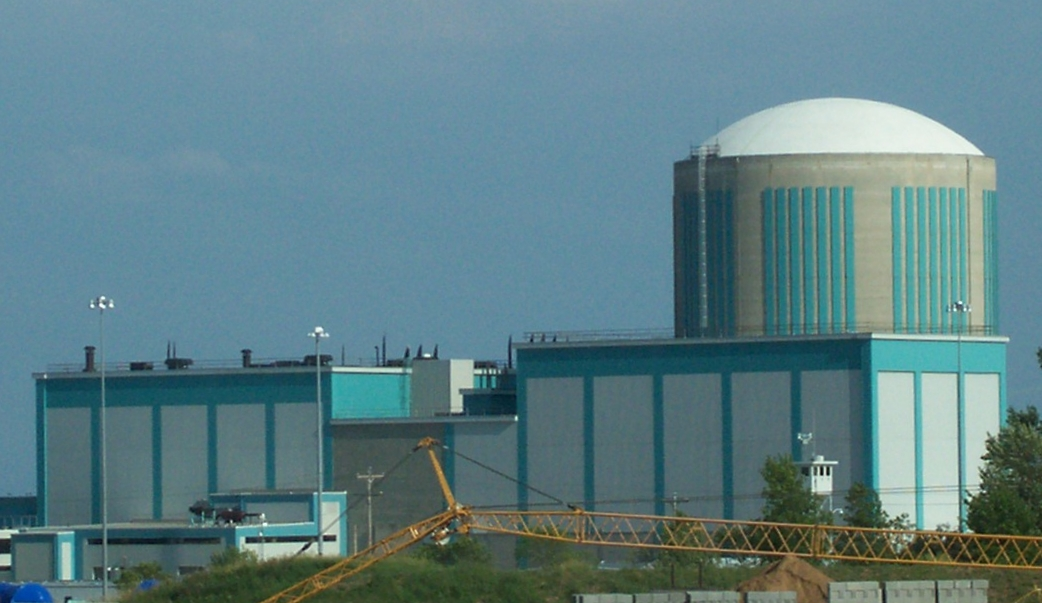
Kewaunee Power Station, 2007

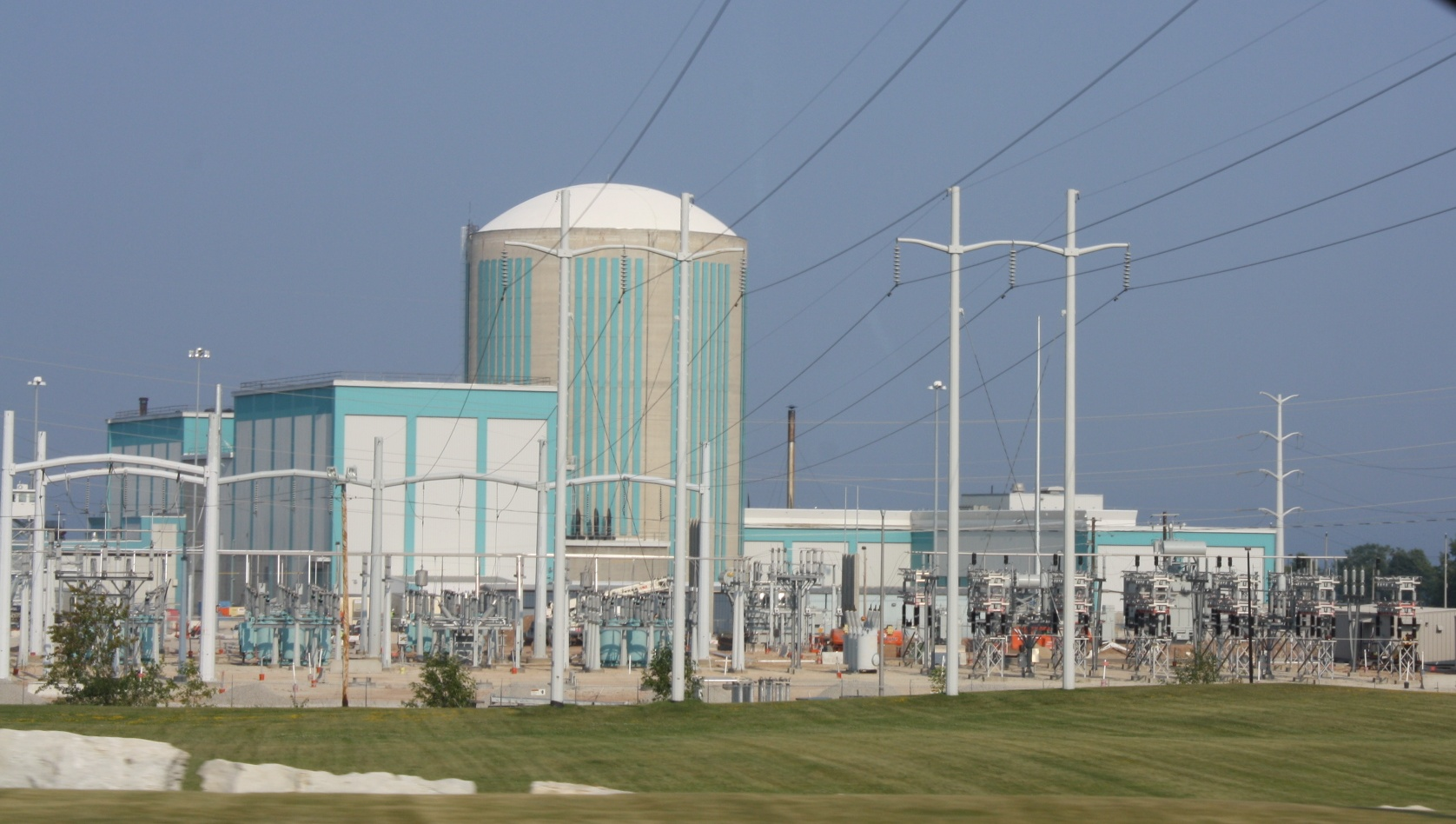
Kewaunee Power Station, 2009
