= Holtec International =

American supplier of equipment and systems for the energy industry

- Industry: Energy
- Founded: 1986; 40 years ago in Mount Laurel, New Jersey, U.S.
- Founder: Kris Singh
- Headquarters: Jupiter, Florida, U.S.
- Website: holtecinternational.com

Holtec International is an American supplier of equipment and systems for the nuclear energy industry. Founded in Mount Laurel, New Jersey in 1986, Holtec International is a privately held technology company with domestic operation centers in New Jersey, Florida, Ohio and Pennsylvania and worldwide in Brazil, India Japan, Mexico, Poland, South Africa, Spain, U.K. and Ukraine.

Holtec manufactures storage and transport casks for spent nuclear fuel and offers products and services, and has been developing small modular reactors and restarting legacy nuclear power plants.

The company has had a series of criminal penalties from states over financial schemes from bribery to falsifying tax documents and manipulating their finances, and has had several incidents while restarting the Palisades Nuclear Generating Station in Michigan.

== History ==
The company was founded by Krishna P. Singh in 1986 and supplied parts for spent nuclear fuel storage in pools and dry casks.

The company paid $2 million in 2010 after a Tennessee Valley Authority bribery investigation.

In July 2014, the New Jersey Economic Development Authority awarded Holtec International a $260 million tax incentive to expand operations at the Port of Camden. Those tax breaks have come under scrutiny. The tax incentive was put on hold as New Jersey said the company didn't disclose that it had been barred from doing federal contract work, but that was overturned by a judge in 2022. In 2024 they agreed to pay a $5 million penalty to end a criminal investigation related to New Jersey tax incentives and another $1 million over the Angel Investor Tax Break Program. Holtec then sued its accounting firm, CBIZ, alleging they had given bad advice.

In 2023 the company's chief financial officer filed a whistleblower lawsuit after being pressured to provide false financial information to investors.

In 2025 the White House announced Holtec had partnered with UAE-based International Holding Company for a $30 billion SMR rollout, but retracted it an hour later.

Holtec had an employee exposed to radiation after falling into a reactor core in 2025, which resulted in a NRSC visit in July 2026 over safety concerns, then had a fuel rod bundle mishap in August. 9 of 15 reactor operators failed their initial test as well.

In September 2026 the paused its plans for an IPO amidst fears that the AI boom would go bust.

== Projects ==
One other innovative project designed for the US nuclear power industry to safety store its used fuel is Holtec's HI-STORE Consolidated Interim Storage Facility (CISF).

The company has contracts to decommission nuclear plants at Oyster Creek generating station, New York’s Indian Point and the Pilgrim plant in Massachusetts, and others. It attempted to build a consolidated nuclear waste storage facility in New Mexico but was mired in financial and logistical issues.

=== SMR-160 ===
Holtec announced the SMR-160, a small modular reactor, in 2010. The Holtec SMR-160, originally named the Holtec Inherently Safe Modular Underground Reactor, is a single loop natural circulation 160 MWe pressurized water reactor with a passive core cooling system without pumps or valves. It uses standard size PWR enriched uranium fuel.

In February 2018, GE Vernova Hitachi Nuclear Energy (then GE Hitachi Nuclear Energy) agreed to collaborate on the commercialization of the design. In 2020 an agreement was made to use Framatome commercially available 17x17 GAIA fuel assembly in the SMR-160.

As of 2020, the SMR-160 is in the first phase of a Canadian Nuclear Safety Commission pre-licensing review.

In 2022, the company asked for a "USD 7.4 billion federal loan to enable it to increase capacity for SMR production at its existing manufacturing facilities, to construct and operate four SMR-160s in the USA and to build a new Holtec Heavy Industries (HHI) complex for higher capacity manufacturing of components and modules for SMR-160s."

=== SMR-300 ===
In December 2023, Holtec announced that it intended to build the first two SMR-300 small modular reactor at Palisades Nuclear Generating Station in Michigan by mid-2030. The SMR-300 adds forced coolant flow to the gravity-driven flow of the SMR-160.

In December 2023, the British government awarded £30 million to Holtec to develop its SMR presence in the UK, where it is one of 6 competitors for an SMR contract. At the same time, the SMR-300 (previously sometimes called the SMR-160+) entered the UK Generic Design Assessment process. In September 2024, Holtec announced it would build a new facility in South Yorkshire to produce the SMR-300 for the European and Middle Eastern markets. In June 2026, Holtec and EDF Energy submitted a proposal to install up to four SMR-300 units at the former coal-fired Cottam power station site, potentially powering a datacentre project at the site.

=== Palisades restart ===
Holtec International is leading a first-of-its-kind effort in the U.S. to restart the Palisades Nuclear Generating Station in Covert, Michigan, which was shut down in 2022. Originally acquired from Entergy for decommissioning, the plant is now being refurbished for recommissioning, with support from a $1.5 billion United States Department of Energy loan and $300 million from the State of Michigan. The restart is expected to deliver 805 MW of carbon-free electricity—enough to power about 800,000 homes—and preserve or create hundreds of jobs. Regulatory progress has been steady, with the Nuclear Regulatory Commission issuing a key environmental finding in June 2025, despite challenges from anti-nuclear groups. Holtec has requalified former operators, expanded staffing, and is conducting extensive maintenance and system upgrades. The restart is targeted for mid-2026, with plans to add two small modular reactors (SMR-300s) at the site by the early 2030's. The project is viewed as a potential model for reviving dormant nuclear plants across the U.S., offering a faster, more cost-effective alternative to new builds, while supporting clean energy goals and grid reliability.

The site has had several safety incidents. An employee fell into the reactor cavity pool over the reactor core in 2025 and was slightly contaminated, receiving minor injuries.In August 2026 a fuel rod bundle tilted during installation, requiring a weeks-long effort to recover the assembly. During operator requalification, only 6 of 15 reactor operators passed their operator licensing test.

== See also ==
- NuScale Power
