= ACA Hurricane =

Electro-mechanical and rotating-directional civil defense siren

The ACA Hurricane is an electro-mechanical and rotating-directional, 130dB civil defense siren, manufactured by Alerting Communicators of America (ACA). ACA began manufacturing the Hurricane 130 in 1968, and ended production in 1981. The Hurricane 130 is similar to the Thunderbolt siren by Federal Signal Corporation and was also popular with towns looking for a high output 130dB siren.

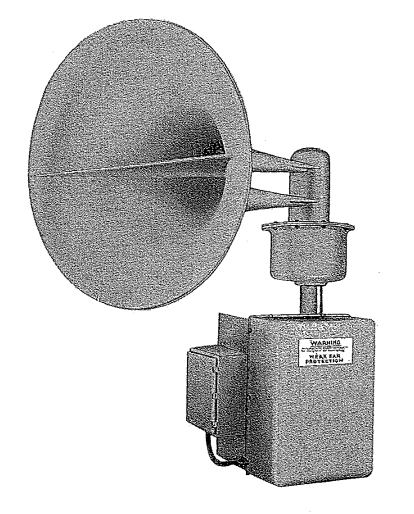
The Hurricane MKII-130 siren illustrated in the manual. (Model CD1-103 Size C)

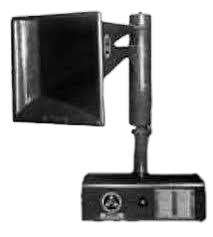
Hurricane 130 model in 1968

== History ==
The ACA Hurricane 130 was designed by James E. Biersach of Alerting Communicators of America (ACA) and was presented at a Civil Defense convention in November 1968. ACA had also manufactured sirens during this time and utilized new fiberglass casting techniques, which was never before used by any other manufacturers. The ACA Hurricane 130 was a supercharged electro-mechanical siren utilizing an air compressor to produce a high output similar to the Thunderbolt siren. It was available in dual tone 8/10, 10/12, 8/12 port, or single tone 8, 10, or 12 port . It was originally called the “ACA hurricane MK1”, most models however came equipped with an 8/10 chopper port ratio (similar to a major third) and it was meant to compete with Federal Signal's Thunderbolt siren series at the time. The ACA Hurricane MK (mark)1 came off with a square horn (similar to the design of the Thunderbolt siren), with the exception of having two throats separately attached to the chopper enclosure. The original ACA Hurricane 130 came with a unique all-in-one chopper and motor assembly with a direct-drive air compressor with a 25-horsepower motor.

ACA later revised the design of the ACA Hurricane 130 to differentiate it from the Thunderbolt siren and to also avoid any potential lawsuits over the two similar designs. ACA also corrected design flaws that were discovered in the original model. These changes to the design include a pole-mounted vertical compressor, with the controller removed from compressor assembly and housed in its own separate enclosure and a redesigned chopper assembly for easy maintenance. The horn was changed to a circular design and this was named the "ACA Hurricane 130 MKII". It also utilizes a belt-driven compressor assembly connected to a 30-horsepower motor, as opposed to the previous direct-drive compressor with a 25-horsepower motor . ACA continued production of the ACA Hurricane siren until 1981, when it was replaced with the Penetrator P-50, a 50-horsepower, dual-tone siren producing 135dB at 100 feet. All versions of the ACA Hurricane are rare, with the early "square-horn" variant being the most rare out of all of them. Most of the units have been replaced by newer and modern sirens. The only remaining units is in Milwaukee, Wisconsin. & westshore services.

== Technical information ==
| Year | Type | Horn Shape | Port Ratios (Chopper) | Notes |
|---|---|---|---|---|
| 1968 | Hurricane 130 | Square | 10/12, 8/12 | Cylinder-shaped rotator assembly, with small slip rings and horizontally mounted direct-drive compressor assembly with a 25 HP motor. |
| 1970s | Hurricane 130 | Square | 10/12, 8/10, 8/12, 8/8, 10/10, and 12/12 | Larger stationary rotator assembly, with larger slip rings for improved performance. |
| 1970s | Hurricane MKII-130 | Round | 10/12, 8/10, 8/12, 8/8, 10/10, and 12/12 | Prototype and experimental stage version, utilizes the exact stationary rotator assembly, chopper assembly, and compressor assembly from the Hurricane 130 model. |
| 1973 | Hurricane MKII-130 | Round | 10/12, 8/10, 8/12, 8/8, 10/10, and 12/12 | This type featured a larger non-stationary rotator box, a redesigned chopper assembly, a larger round exponential horn, and used a 30 HP compressor, as opposed to an earlier 25 HP compressor. |
| 1973 | Hurricane MKII-130 | Round | 10/12, 8/10, 8/12, 8/8, 10/10, and 12/12 | This type featured a “Bowl” like rotator, which was just a modified MKI Rotator base with the blower pipe connecting in the middle instead of one direct end side. It also featured a long round horn. And an option to be coded, it used bolts to connect the top of the rotator to the “Bowl”, Similar to the MKI. |
| 1973 | Hurricane MKII-130-3 | Round | 10/12, 8/10, 8/12, 8/8, 10/10, and 12/12 | Equipped with solenoids to produce "High-Low" tone capability for a "Fire" signal. |
| Mid-1970s | Hurricane MKII-130 | Round | 10/12, 8/10, 8/12, 8/8, 10/10, and 12/12 | Utilizes a modified "clamshell type" rotator box to allow for easy maintenance. Most commonly seen Hurricane of all types which mostly came with an 8/10 chopper port ratio. |

== Cities that had/use the Hurricane 130/MKII-130 Model ==
| Cities Using Or That Have Used The ACA Hurricane | Number of Sirens, Operation Status | Model |
|---|---|---|
| Addyston, OH | 1, removed which was roof-mounted and was later in possession by Clayton Werden Electric Company and currently now in private possession. | MKII-130 |
| Apple Valley, MN | 1, removed | MKII-130 |
| Baxter, MN | 5 units were installed, all removed and replaced. | 130 |
| Benton Harbor, MI | 14 units were installed as part of the early warning system for Donald C. Cook Nuclear Power Plant. All removed and replaced in 1996 with WPS-2000 series electronic sirens from Whelen Engineering Company. | MKII-130 |
| Centralia, IL | 1, this unit was removed in 2010 and it is currently in private possession. | 130 |
| Crystal River, FL | 5 units were installed for Crystal River Nuclear Power Plant early warning system, all replaced with electronic sirens from Whelen Engineering Company. | 130, MKII-130 |
| Darien, IL | 3, all removed and replaced with the last unit being replaced in 2021. | MKII-130 |
| DeKalb, IL | 3, all removed with 1 unit was a 1968 version of the Hurricane which featured a smaller cylinder-shaped rotator assembly. All were replaced around 1989 with Federal Signal 2001-DC electro-mechanical sirens around due to partial system failure during a tornado warning. | 130 |
| Elk Grove Village, IL | 4, removed and 1 unit was replaced with a Penetrator P-50. | 130 |
| Garland, TX | 11, removed. The first 2 units were removed and sold at an auction in April 2001, while the last 2 units were removed and sold at an auction in November 2004. Replaced with omnidirectional electronic sirens from Acoustic Technologies Incorporated (ATI) and were replaced later with sirens from Whelen Engineering Company. | MKII-130 |
| Glendale, WI | 1, removed which was located at North Shore Montessori School and was replaced in 1992 with a Penetrator P-15 located at Lincoln Park. | MKII-130 |
| Greendale, WI | 1, removed and replaced with a Tempest T-128. | MKII-130 |
| Greenville, TX | 2, both have been removed and sold in an auction. | MKII-130 |
| Kewaunee, WI | 2, both removed and replaced | MKII-130 |
| La Crescent, MN | 3, removed. The Hurricane MKII-130 siren located at Veteran's Park was replaced by a Sentry 10V electro-mechanical and omnidirectional siren, while the other unit located in at Community Ice Arena was replaced by a Federal Signal 2001-130. The third unit which was located in Kistler Park did not have any type of siren replacement. Before its replacement, the last two (2) active units in La Crescent have no functional rotator mechanism and one of which does not have any functional compressor which resulted in weaker coverage. | MKII-130 |
| Miami, FL | 1, removed which was installed roof-mounted on top of One Biscayne Tower. | 130 |
| Milwaukee, WI | Exact number of units unknown, only 1 unit remains active located at Milwaukee Fire Station 39 (8025 W Bradley Rd.) with no plans of replacement with the other unit currently stored at the headquarters of American Signal Corporation. | MKII-130, 130 |
| Minnetonka, MN | 6, all removed. | 130 |
| Mishicot, WI | 6 units installed for Point Beach Nuclear Plant early warning system, removed. | MKII-130 |
| Moore, OK | 2, all removed and replaced. | MKII-130 |
| Nekoosa, WI | 1, removed which was roof-mounted and had three signal capability located at Nekoosa Fire Department. (951 Market St.) | MKII-130 |
| New Brighton, MN | Exact number of units unknown, one unit was installed on top of New Brighton Elementary School which was removed and replaced. | 130 |
| Normal, IL | 3, all removed. One unit was installed at Parkside Elementary School, the other was installed behind a Kroger on Hunt Dr, and the third on Northtown and Warehouse Road, got replaced by a P-15. | MKII-130 |
| Oak Harbor, OH | 4, all units were part of the early warning system for Davis-Besse Nuclear Power Station and were replaced with electro-mechanical sirens from Federal Signal. | MKII-130 |
| Plymouth, MN | 1, this unit was placed along I-694 which was removed in 1990 and replaced by a Federal Signal 2001-DC. | 130 |
| Rolling Meadows, IL | 3, removed. 1 unit had three signal capability, and was a hybrid between a MK1 Model and a MKI with a rotator from the MKI and horn was from the MKII which was located at Former Rolling Meadows Fire Department Station 15 and was replaced by an ACA Alertronic AL-6000R in 1988. All Alertronic AL-6000R units that replaced the Hurricane 130 units have been replaced with a Tempest T-128 from American Signal Corporation. | 130, MKII-130 |
| Spencer, IN | 2, both removed in 1993 with 1 unit bought by a private owner. | MKII-130 |
| Two Creeks, WI | 1 unit installed for Point Beach Nuclear Plant early warning system, removed. | MKII-130 |
| Two Rivers, WI | 2 units installed for Point Beach Nuclear Plant early warning system, both removed. | MKII-130 |
| Wisconsin Rapids, WI | 1, removed. | MKII-130 |
| St. Augustine, FL | 1, removed, was located at St. Johns fire rescue station #3 | MKII-130 |
