= Point Beach Nuclear Plant =

Nuclear power plant in Two Rivers, Wisconsin, U.S.

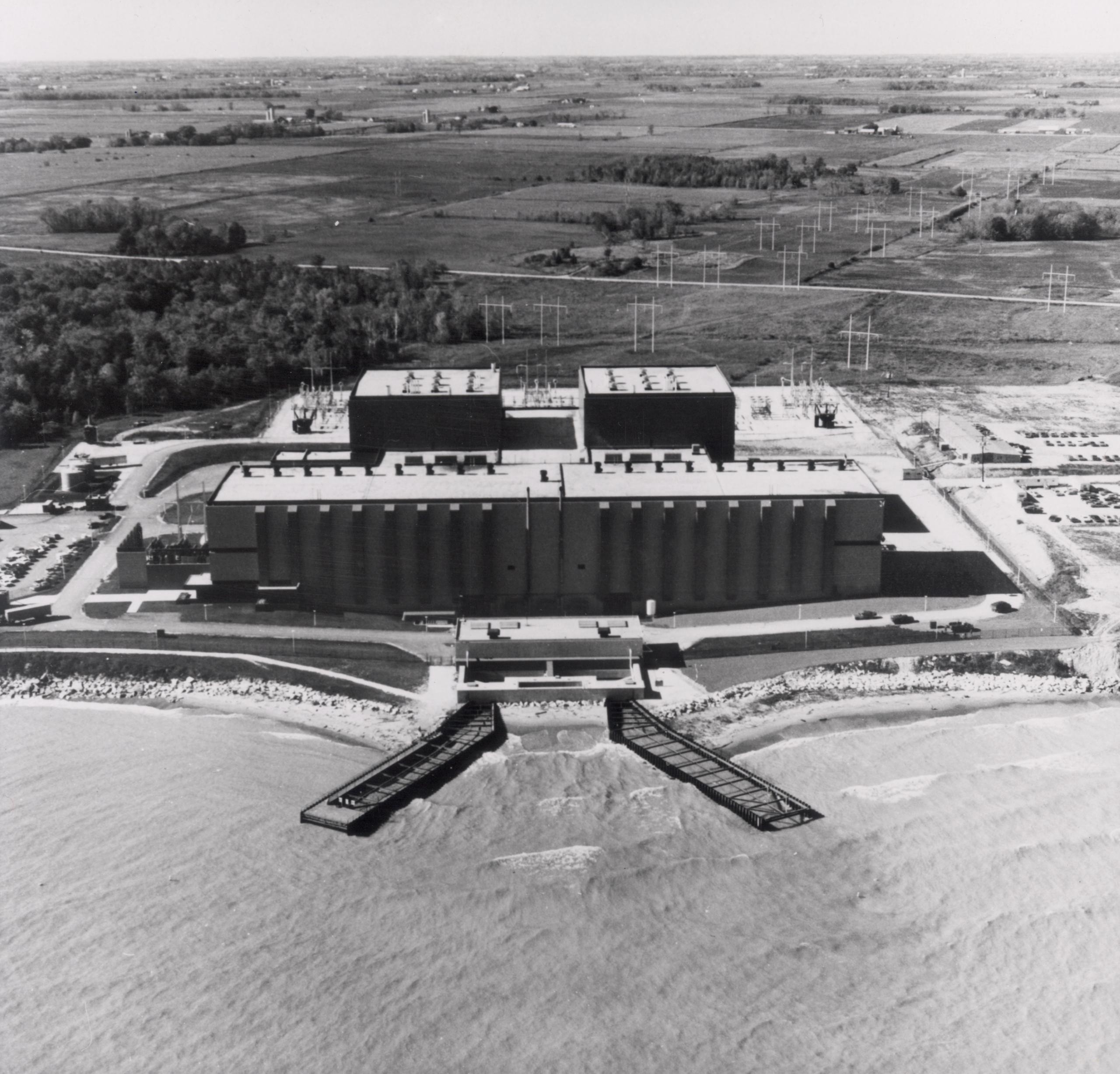
- Point Beach Nuclear Plant
- Country: United States
- Location: Town of Two Creeks, Manitowoc County, near Two Rivers, Wisconsin
- Coordinates: 44°16′52″N 87°32′12″W
- Status: Operational
- Construction began: Unit 1: July 19, 1967; Unit 2: July 25, 1968
- Commission date: Unit 1: December 21, 1970; Unit 2: October 1, 1972
- Construction cost: Unit 1: $60.6 million, 1971 USD ($452 million, 2023 USD); Unit 2: $54.3 million, 1972 USD ($392 million, 2023 USD)
- Owner: NextEra Energy Resources
- Operator: NextEra Energy Resources
- Employees: 400

Nuclear power station
- Reactor type: PWR
- Reactor supplier: Westinghouse
- Cooling source: Lake Michigan
- Thermal capacity: 2 × 1800 MW_{th}

Power generation
- Units operational: 2 × 625 MW
- Make and model: WH 2-loop (DRYAMB)
- Nameplate capacity: 1182 MW
- Capacity factor: 97.99% (2024); 82.80% (lifetime)
- Annual net output: 10,147 GWh (2024)

External links
- Website: Point Beach Nuclear Plant
- Commons: Related media on Commons

Point Beach Nuclear Plant is a nuclear power plant located on Lake Michigan in the town of Two Creeks, Wisconsin, United States. The plant was built by Wisconsin Electric Power Company (now We Energies, a subsidiary of Wisconsin Energy Corporation), and previously operated by the Nuclear Management Company. The plant is currently owned and operated by NextEra Energy Resources (prior to 2009 – FPL Energy), of Juno Beach, Florida. The plant is composed of two, two-loop Westinghouse pressurized water reactors. There is also a visitors' center located just south of the administration building.

Construction for Unit 1 began in 1966 and it was placed into commercial operation in December 1970. Unit 2 was placed into commercial operation in September 1972. The plant was built for a total cost of $114.9 million ($844 million, 2023 USD).

The entire site covers 1,050 acres; approximately 70 acres are used for the nuclear power plant and transmission yard infrastructure and the remaining land used for agriculture or solar arrays.

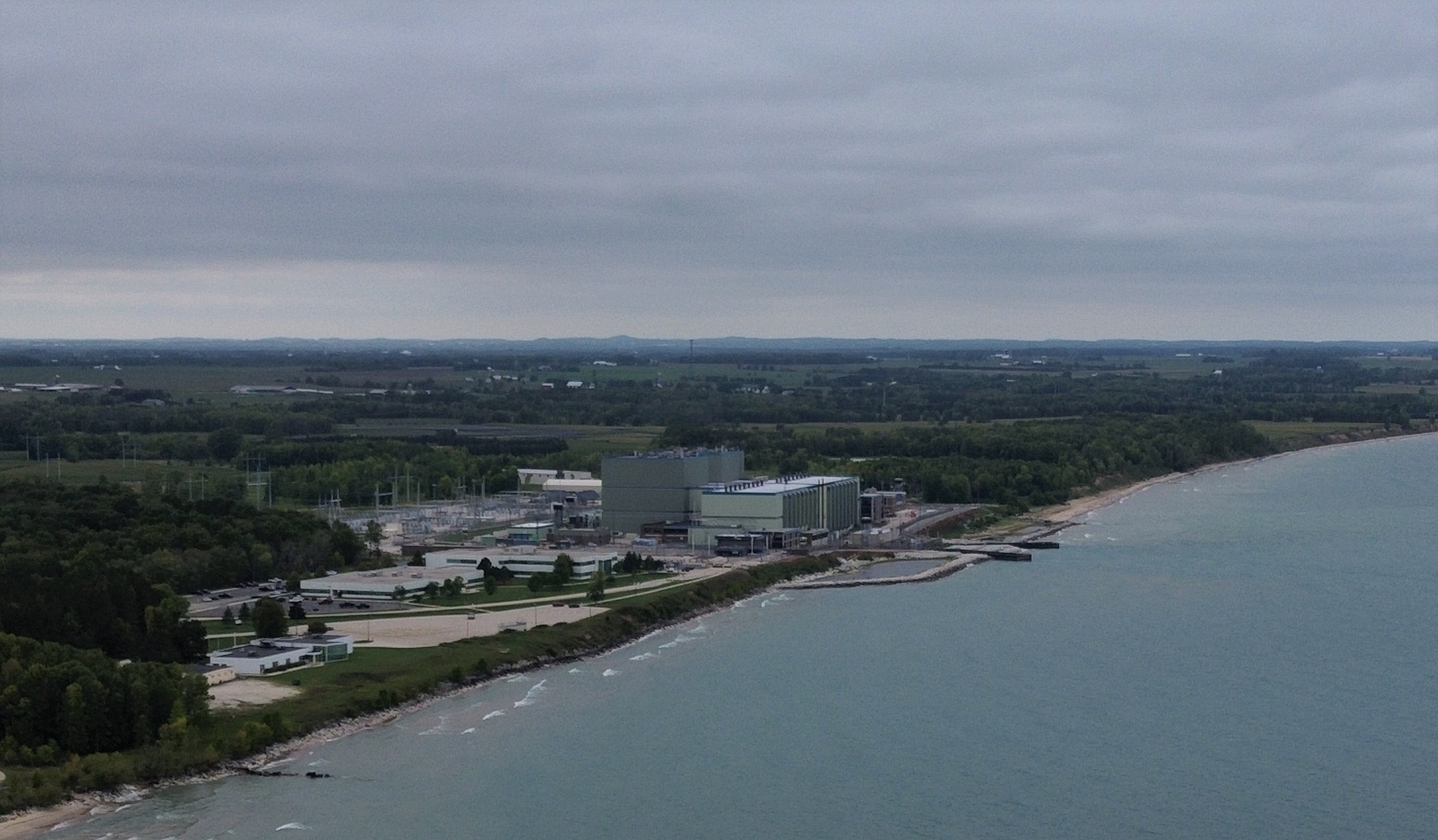
Point Beach Nuclear Plant - September 2023

== History ==
The original letter of intent to purchase a single 454 megawatt (MW) nuclear unit from Westinghouse Electric Company for a fixed-price was issued by Wisconsin Electric and Wisconsin Michigan Power Company (a Wisconsin Electric subsidiary) on December 30, 1965. The right was reserved to order a second, duplicate unit under the same terms. In May, 1966, the announcement was made that the plant would be built on a 1,200-acre site in the town of Two Creeks.

On November 28, 1966, following Public Service Commission of Wisconsin (PSCW) endorsement and a brief public hearing, Alfred Gruhl, Glenn Reed, and Sol Burstein turned the first symbolic spades of dirt for the official ground-breaking. In May, 1967, the Atomic Energy Commission (AEC), predecessor to the Nuclear Regulatory Commission (NRC), issued the official construction permit (number 32) for Point Beach Unit 1. The Unit 2 construction permit (number 47) was issued approximately a year later.

On October 5, 1970, the AEC issued its full-term, full-power Operating License (DPR-24) for Point Beach Unit 1. The loading fuel into the reactor commenced almost immediately. On November 2, 1970, operators achieved initial criticality, with the nuclear-powered electricity being produced four days later, on November 6. Full commercial service was reached on December 21, 1970, just 49 months from the initial groundbreaking ceremony. After delays from nuclear power opponents, Unit 2 was granted a full-term, full-power operating license (DPR-27) on March 8, 1973, almost 1 1/2 years behind the original schedule.

Due to steam generator tube degradation and failures caused by intergranular stress corrosion cracking, Unit 1 was operated at approximately 75-80% of full power from December 1979 until October 1983, when replacement steam generators were installed. The Unit 2 steam generators were replaced in 1996–1997.

In 2005, the NRC approved the initial license renewal application for the Point Beach plant, extending the operating license from forty years to sixty. in 2011, the NRC approved a 17% increase in power output (a.k.a. extended power uprate) from both units. This entailed significant upgrades to several plant systems and components, including safety-related pumps and valves, as well as the turbine-generator sets.

NextEra Energy Resources purchased the plant from Wisconsin Electric Power Company in October 2007. As part of the sale, We Energies agreed to repurchase all of the power produced by the plant for at least 20 years. In 2000–2007 the plant was managed by the Nuclear Management Company.

Owners submitted applications for 20 year subsequent license extension for both units to the NRC in November 2020. The decision announcement was expected in July 2022, however this was delayed as the NRC required additional environmental impact evaluation be completed. A NRC public meeting was held on February 17, 2021 to solicit public comments on the scope of the environmental review.

Both units were granted subsequent license extensions on September 29, 2025, allowing the plant to operate until the early 2050s.

The plant is interconnected to the grid by four 345 kV lines. One leaves the area to the northwest connecting to the We Energies North Appleton substation. Another interconnects with the now-closed Kewaunee Nuclear Generating Station located a short distance north of Point Beach. The remaining 345 kV lines exit towards Milwaukee.

== Electricity production ==
Point Beach generated 10,147 GWh in 2024, just under 16% of all electricity produced in Wisconsin, comprising 58% of all low-carbon energy generated.

Generation (MWh) Point Beach Power Plant (Nuclear Only)
Year	Jan	Feb	Mar	Apr	May	Jun	Jul	Aug	Sep	Oct	Nov	Dec	Total (Annual)
2001	747,957	634,093	750,906	433,802	562,905	693,537	728,365	707,943	569,003	742,015	734,847	739,695	8,045,068
2002	751,028	624,538	753,521	505,585	574,254	730,869	746,848	751,595	520,408	532,423	734,354	754,656	7,980,079
2003	753,611	689,821	765,308	682,667	743,000	735,053	587,460	755,886	690,771	405,146	479,990	767,623	8,056,336
2004	768,940	714,409	760,799	395,417	323,118	620,125	759,345	763,343	738,197	734,412	668,786	767,076	8,013,967
2005	766,668	687,003	765,872	379,312	378,941	366,707	588,370	753,784	646,520	384,587	436,960	718,979	6,873,703
2006	767,529	692,841	761,705	744,257	763,705	736,477	763,706	745,747	731,483	556,789	527,817	768,360	8,560,416
2007	765,914	694,126	765,807	370,255	668,624	576,726	758,404	747,943	656,843	764,043	750,088	765,740	8,284,513
2008	580,167	667,760	770,034	426,997	597,286	738,617	759,633	741,942	728,096	427,927	566,303	762,453	7,767,215
2009	763,248	691,021	765,343	742,080	696,917	736,501	757,545	758,499	714,270	543,595	327,645	671,169	8,167,833
2010	764,991	687,983	380,308	689,603	767,038	633,399	699,236	746,163	742,782	764,896	749,905	664,381	8,290,685
2011	769,544	694,377	381,450	367,461	377,870	444,345	825,187	813,999	795,349	469,283	434,287	591,874	6,965,026
2012	885,774	829,858	881,358	804,487	895,831	817,735	823,428	818,423	830,321	888,894	430,848	876,746	9,783,703
2013	888,923	803,648	686,951	577,038	892,324	865,249	889,843	849,959	855,549	894,609	866,060	871,562	9,941,715
2014	894,014	807,255	647,855	551,744	878,772	862,226	892,854	854,574	863,958	484,812	846,101	862,931	9,447,096
2015	894,261	807,599	889,908	865,194	894,308	862,785	890,823	886,946	848,182	471,374	826,112	870,691	10,008,183
2016	896,413	838,689	599,550	771,742	895,263	862,524	890,714	879,818	859,221	891,601	869,130	896,729	10,151,394
2017	896,822	809,449	680,478	604,968	899,032	869,363	884,636	880,360	848,354	522,531	852,038	900,948	9,648,979
2018	900,095	811,599	897,070	867,179	897,537	864,881	892,088	883,172	851,052	565,516	873,212	825,721	10,129,122
2019	891,565	799,500	754,943	569,831	858,658	867,739	896,065	858,088	866,670	896,614	873,465	897,167	10,030,305
2020	896,579	838,452	621,646	776,698	899,562	868,122	887,222	887,469	863,889	490,510	844,423	896,761	9,771,333
2021	894,739	802,967	892,180	852,662	898,669	865,696	876,100	822,904	828,038	532,678	805,580	897,977	9,970,190
2022	896,422	809,933	782,184	534,981	897,835	868,658	891,034	880,963	852,915	893,605	871,077	897,411	10,077,018
2023	896,138	800,625	569,821	787,181	897,143	857,775	883,965	878,340	847,220	521,677	845,414	897,468	9,682,767
2024	894,969	836,930	896,880	868,750	894,629	863,266	880,794	873,017	829,988	569,119	841,246	897,283	10,146,871
2025	894,253	807,587	729,358	708,508	895,534	865,220	882,860	878,398	856,900	890,951	869,106	896,836	10,175,511
2026	894,201	808,009	625,280	680,259	894,554	862,431	881,880	877,327					--

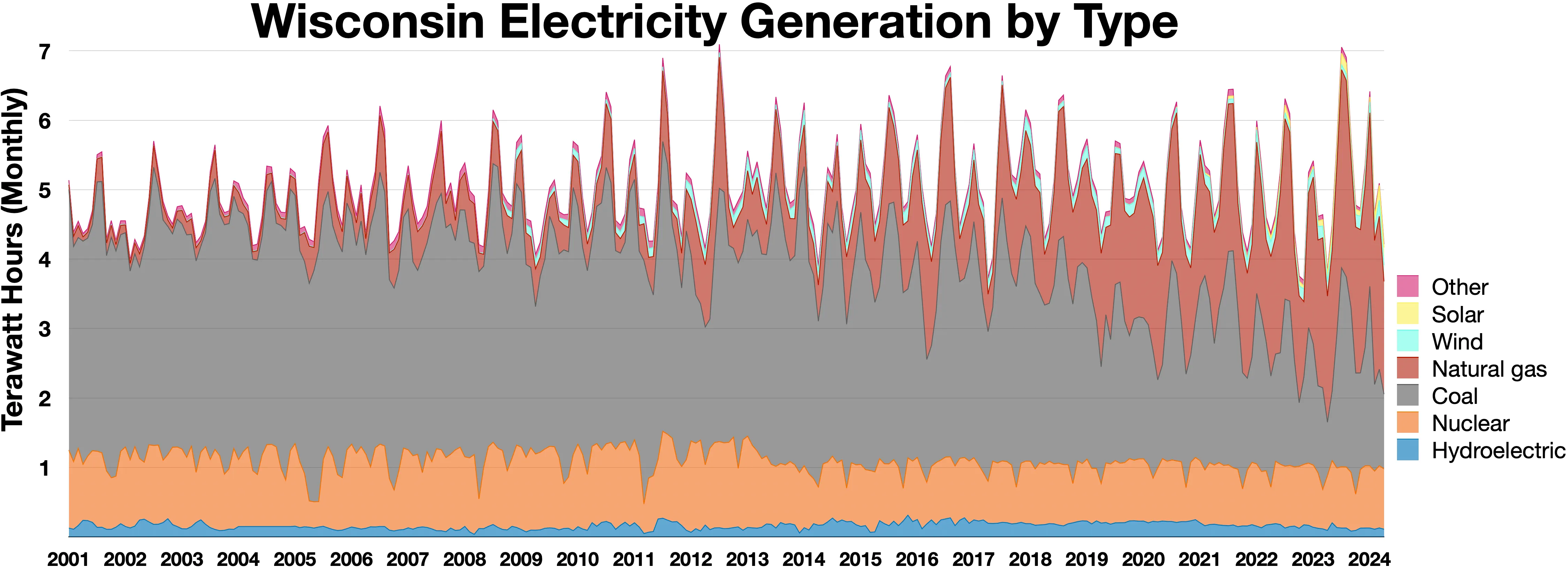
Wisconsin electricity generation by type

Wisconsin electricity generation by fuel type (GWh)
Source	Year								% of 2017 Total	% of 2024 Total
Source	2017	2018	2019	2020	2021	2022	2023	2024	% of 2017 Total	% of 2024 Total
Coal	35,437	32,933	26,003	23,490	27,233	21,738	20,972	20,700	55.9	32.4
Petroleum oil	32	35	52	18	162	29	46	-	0.1	-
Petroleum coke	111	101	90	86	154	145	43	3	0.2	0.0
Natural gas	13,110	16,067	19,514	21,098	20,369	22,406	24,664	25,575	20.7	40.1
Nuclear	9,649	10,129	10,030	9,771	9,970	10,077	9,683	10,147	15.2	15.9
Hydroelectric	2,489	2,251	2,527	2,661	2,023	1,984	1,830	1,798	3.9	2.8
Wind	1,633	1,611	1,849	1,735	1,566	1,784	1,711	1,967	2.6	3
Utility-scale solar	21	35	36	90	363	802	1,274	2,932	0.0	4.6
Biomass	842	816	764	686	721	802	708	639	1.3	1
Other	17	17	21	20	23	22	95	107	0.0	0.2
Total generation	63,341	63,995	60,886	59,655	62,584	59,700	61,027	63,818		

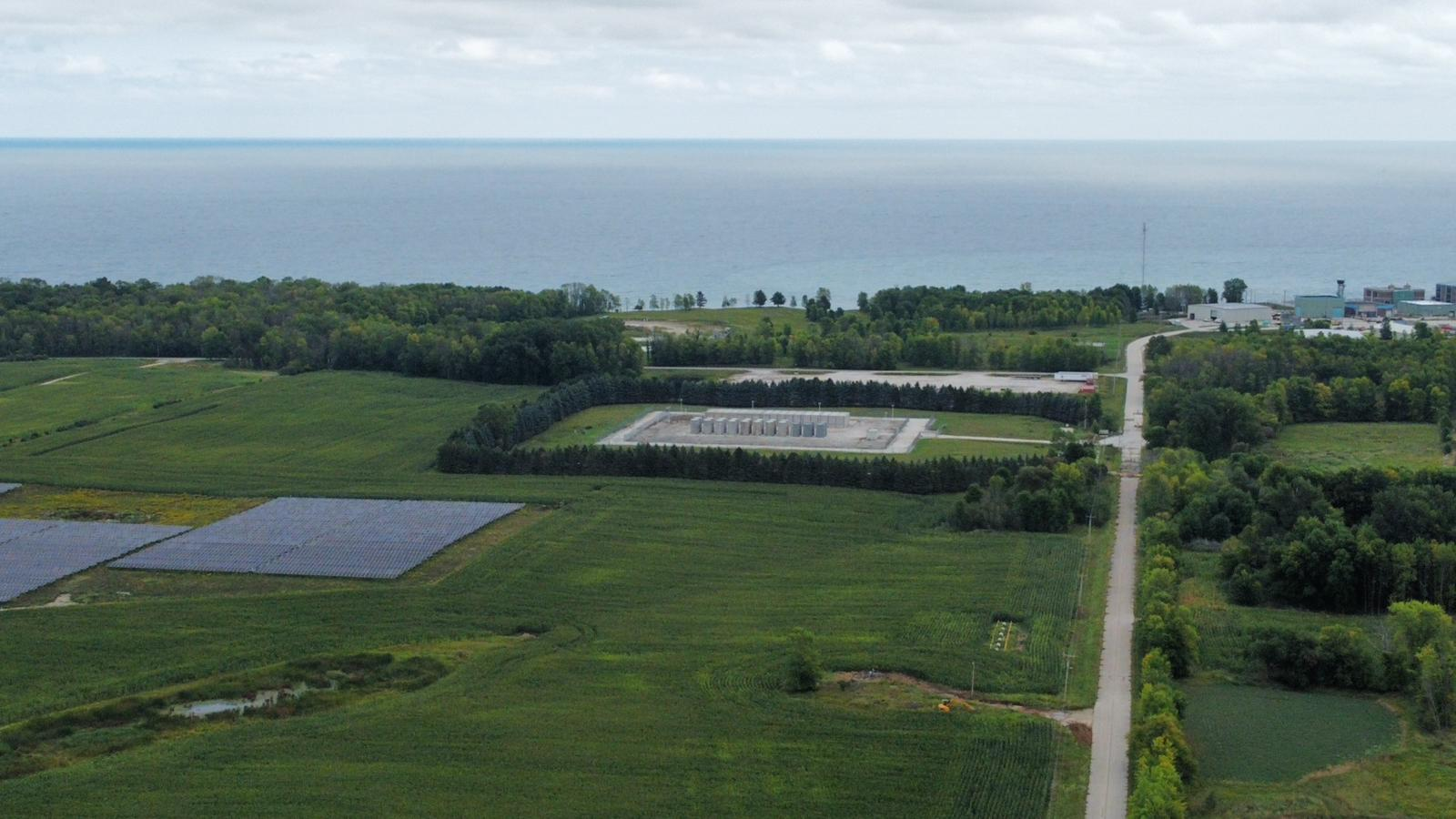
Point Beach Nuclear Plant ISFSI (Independent Spent Fuel Storage Installation) - September 2023

== Surrounding population ==
The Nuclear Regulatory Commission defines two emergency planning zones around nuclear power plants: a plume exposure pathway zone with a radius of 10 miles (16 km), concerned primarily with exposure to, and inhalation of, airborne radioactive contamination, and an ingestion pathway zone of about 50 miles (80 km), concerned primarily with ingestion of food and liquid contaminated by radioactivity.

The 2010 U.S. population within 10 miles (16 km) of Point Beach was 19,975, a decrease of 6.7 percent in a decade, according to an analysis of U.S. Census data for msnbc.com. The 2010 U.S. population within 50 miles (80 km) was 777,556, an increase of 10.0 percent since 2000. Cities within 50 miles include Green Bay (28 miles to city center).

== Seismic risk ==
The Nuclear Regulatory Commission's estimate of the risk each year of an earthquake intense enough to cause core damage to the reactor at Point Beach was 1 in 90,909, according to an NRC study published in August 2010. This was tied for 62 in a list of 104 with #1 being most at risk.

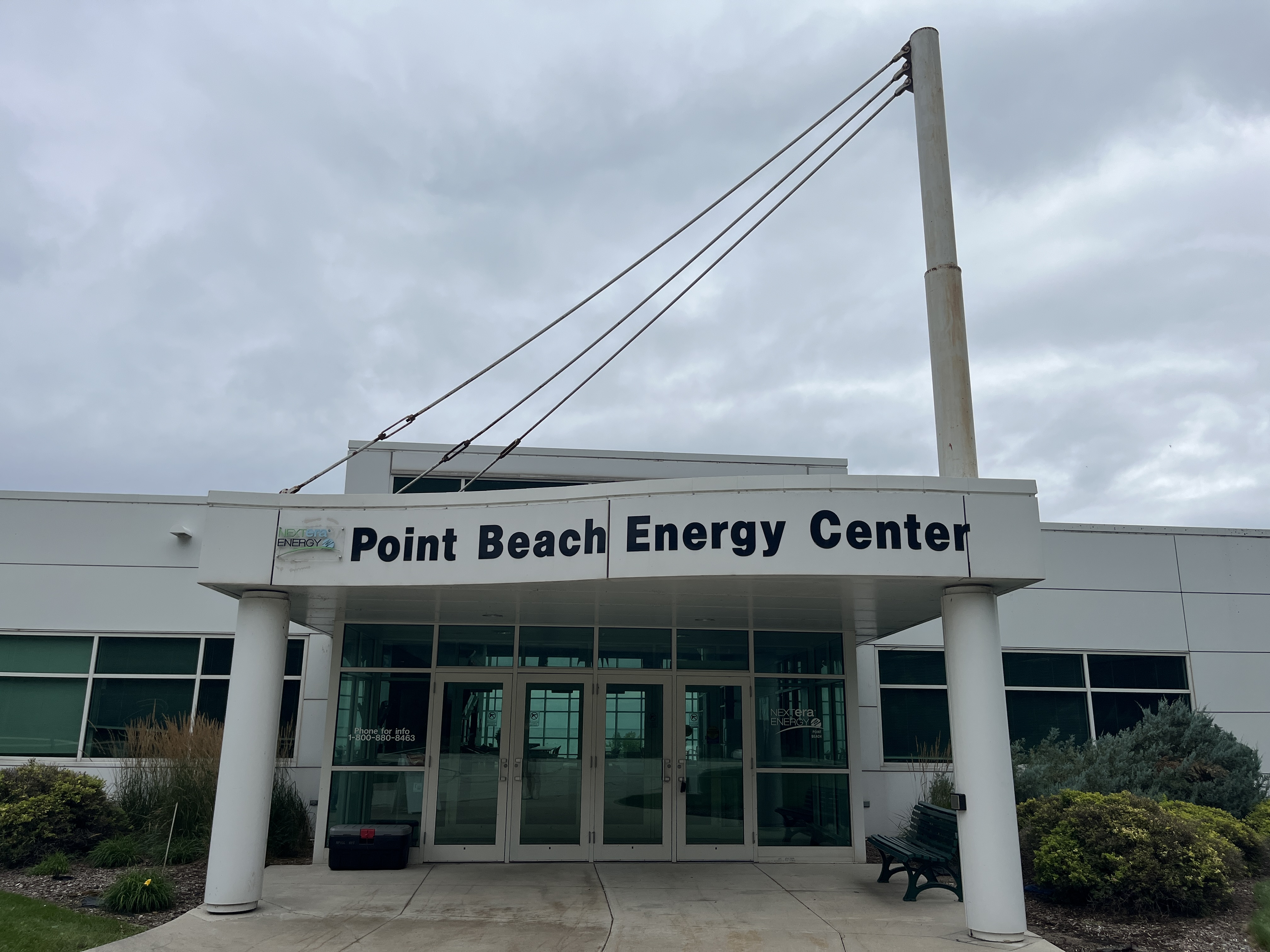
Point Beach Energy Center

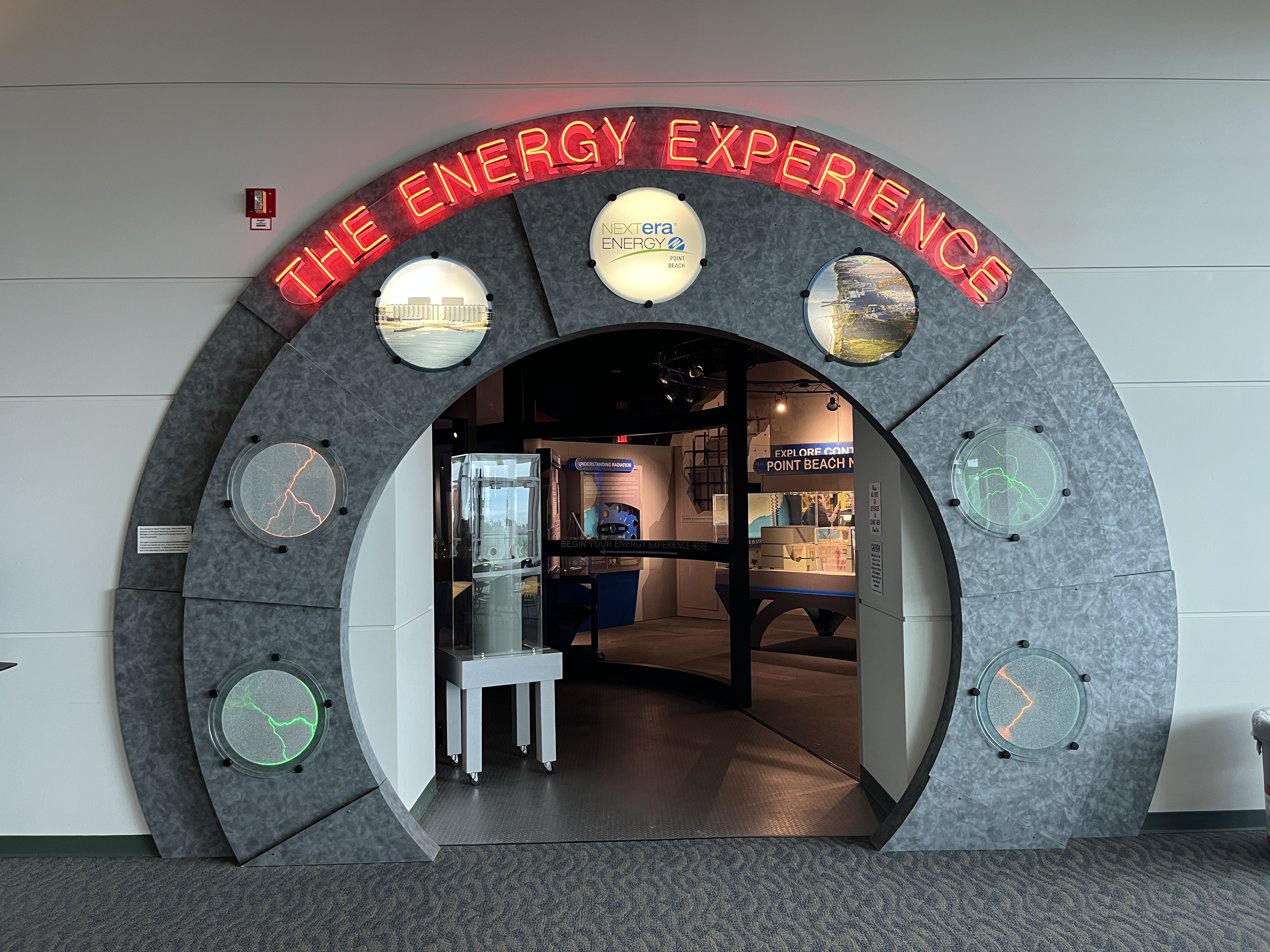
Point Beach The Energy Experience Exhibit - An interactive, educational exhibit within the Point Beach Energy Center
