= Hörmann =

German door manufacturer

- Industry: Door manufacturing, installation, and servicing
- Founded: 1935; 91 years ago
- Founder: August Hörmann
- Headquarters: Steinhagen, North Rhine-Westphalia, Germany
- Area served: Worldwide
- Key people: Martin J. Hörmann, Christoph Hörmann
- Revenue: Over 1 billion euro
- Number of employees: >6,000
- Website: www.hoermann.com

Hörmann is a German manufacturer of doors, garages, door frames, and gates for commercial and private real estate. Operating globally, the family-owned business is Germany's largest door producer and the fourth biggest door manufacturer in the world. The company has 26 specialized plants in Europe, North America and Asia, and more than 6,000 personnel. The Hörmann Group's annual turnover is over 1 billion euro.

== History ==
The company was officially founded in Bielefeld in 1935 under the name “Bielefelder Stahltürenfabrik” by August Hörmann (1886–1944). His son, Hermann Hörmann (1912–1994), took over the company in 1944 and moved the headquarters to Steinhagen. By adding the up-and-over garage door to the product range, he laid the foundations for today’s group of companies.

The company became synonymous with home garages in Germany in the 1950s, and was widely known for introducing the Berry swing gate to German consumers. Since that time, its product range has expanded to include wooden interior doors, canopies, steel sheet doors, door frames, interior and exterior entrance doors, manual and drive-driven industrial door systems, and state-of-the-art fire protection and multifunctional door systems for commercial real estate.

In 2015, the company opened a training and exhibition center in its hometown of Steinhagen, Germany. The following year, a nationwide survey held by Deutschland Test found the Hörmann Group to be one of the most popular family-owned businesses in Germany, with 100,000 customers expressing an overall positive experience with the company and its products. Its place in the ranking was 52nd of 229 participating companies.

The family business is now run by the fourth generation, the great-grandchildren of the company’s founder. The personally liable partners are Martin J. Hörmann and Christoph Hörmann.

== Social, cultural and community involvement ==
Hörmann supports projects run by charitable organisations and institutions that focus, for example, on the situation of people with disabilities or chronic illnesses. Furthermore, Hörmann is active in sport, for example through perimeter advertising at international matches involving European national football teams (including the German national football team), as a sponsor of the ATP Halle in Halle (Westphalia) and, since 2016, as a premium sponsor of the IBU Biathlon World Cup. Since the 2018/19 winter sports season, the company has also been the official main sponsor of the Four Hills Tournament and an event sponsor of the FIS Ski Jumping World Cups in Ruka and Zakopane.

Hörmann UK has also served as a sponsor of the Coalville Town FC and Kesteven Rugby Club.

The Hörmann Group was previously a sponsor of Formula One legend Michael Schumacher, who served as the company's brand ambassador.

== Locations ==
Hörmann has over 40 production sites across Europe, North America and Asia, and is represented by over 100 of its own sales offices in more than 40 countries, as well as by distribution partners in over 50 further countries. In addition to its sales and production sites, Hörmann operates several training and exhibition centres for its staff and customers, including the Hörmann Forum at its headquarters in Steinhagen and an installation centre near Stuttgart.

The Hörmann Group comprises the following subsidiaries:

- ALUKON KG (Germany)
- Seuster KG (Germany)
- Berner Torantriebe KG (Germany)
- HUGA KG (Germany)
- Schörghuber Spezialtüren KG (Germany)
- SC electronic service GmbH (Germany)
- Grothaus Pendeltüren GmbH & Co. KG (Germany)
- Lebo Türen GmbH (Germany)
- Steinau KG (Germany)
- Tortec Brandschutztor GmbH (Austria)
- Garador Ltd. (UK)
- IG Doors Ltd. (UK)
- Tubauto SAS (France)
- Maviflex SAS (France)
- PILOMAT s.r.l. (Italy)
- Northwest Door LLC (USA)
- TNR Industrial Doors Inc. (Canada)
- MESVAC OY (Finland)
