= List of civil defense sirens =

This is a list of civil defense sirens.

== Alerting Communicators of America (ACA) sirens ==
- ACA Cyclone
- ACA Hurricane

== ATI sirens ==
- ATI HPSS

== Federal Signal sirens ==
- Thunderbolt (siren)
- Federal Signal 3T22 / 2T22
- Federal Signal Model 2
- Federal Signal Modulator
- Federal Signal STH-10

== Other ==
- Chrysler Air-Raid Siren
- Sentry Siren
- SiraTone
- Decot
- Heath Siren
