= Acoustic Technology Incorporated =

American siren manufacturer

- Industry: Public safety
- Area served: United States; Israel (distributed by a different company but produced by ATI)
- Products: Civil defense sirens; Loudspeaker; Radios
- Website: atisystems.com

Acoustic Technology Inc. (ATI), doing business as ATI Systems is an American electronic speaker and siren manufacturer based out of Boston, Massachusetts.

== History ==
According to ATI, they began as an acoustic consulting firm. In the late 80's the company started production of sirens.

== Products ==
=== Sirens ===
==== HPSS series ====
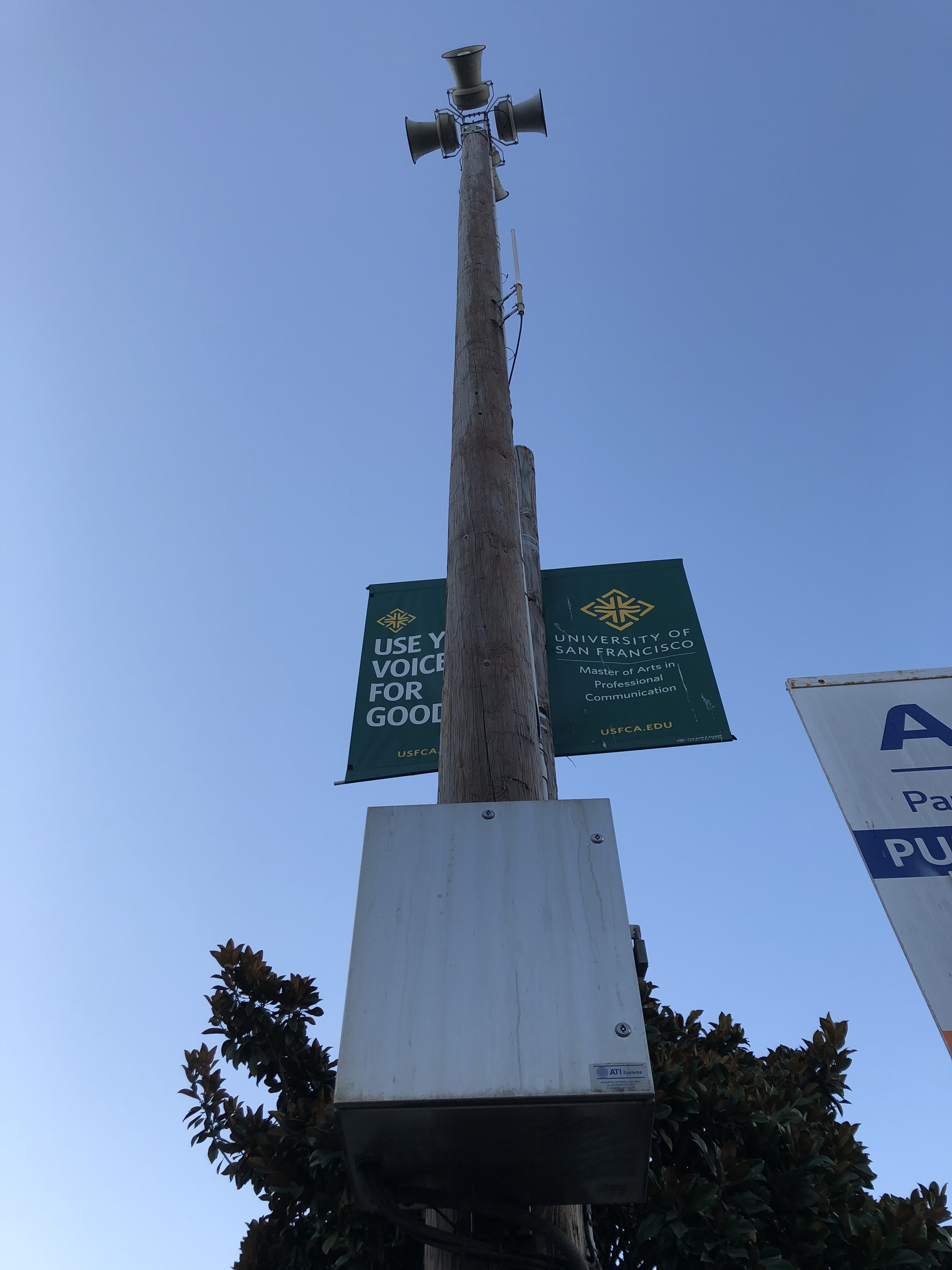
An HPSS 16 in San Francisco.

The ATI High Powered Speaker Station (HPSS), is an electronic outdoor warning civil defense siren manufactured by Acoustic Technology, Inc (ATI) that is used to alert citizens of air raids and natural disasters.

HPSS systems use high-powered electronic speakers, which can be independently arranged to provide directional, omnidirectional, and formerly rotational coverage. The HPSS16 has four speakers, while the HPSS32 has eight speakers. The HPSS16R and HPSS32R are former rotational models that were discontinued. They can be used as public address (PA) systems and can play programmed tones. Options include solar-powered operation and pre-recorded voice messages.

===== HPSS 16 =====
The HPSS 16 is an omni-directional siren. It is the most common model produced by ATI. A system of these sirens was installed in San Francisco, however it currently inactive due to fears of cyber attacks.

===== HPSS 32 =====
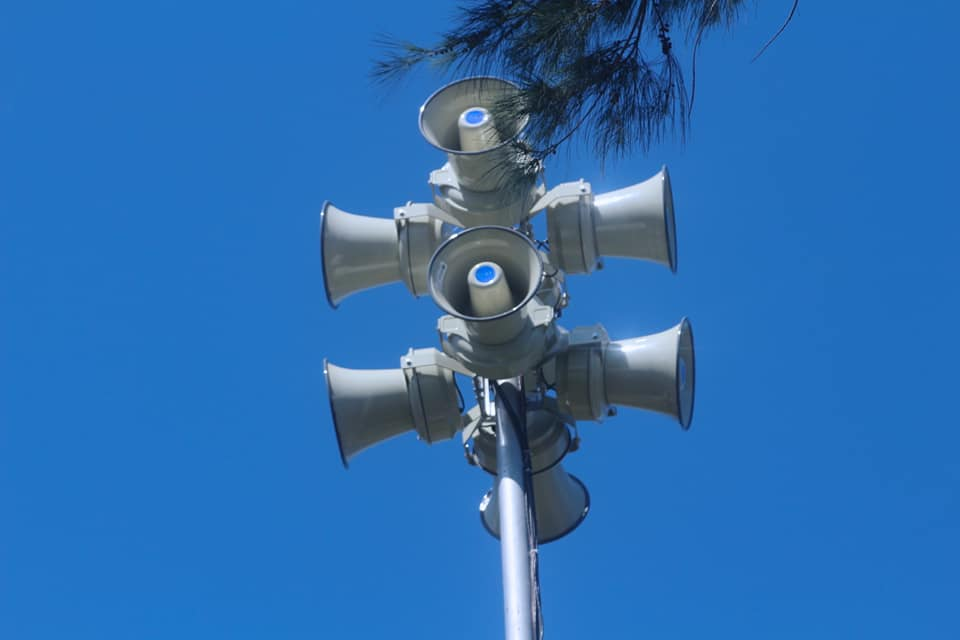
ATI in service

The HPSS 32 is an omni directional siren. It is essentially 2 HPSS 32 sirens stacked on top of each other.

===== MHPSS =====
The MHPSS (short for Mobile High Powered Speaker Station) is essentially an HPSS 16 mounted on a mobile cart

== Controversy ==
=== System failures ===
- On March 15, 2026, an EF1 tornado touched down in the village of New Athens, Illinois. The county sirens, consisting of ATI sirens, failed to sound automatically when a tornado warning was issued. County officials didn't realize until 15 minutes before the tornado touched down: when they did realize, they manually activated them. Technicians arrived to inspect the sirens, and luckily no injuries were reported. The sirens in question were completely installed by ATI in June 2025, while the installation spanned for over 2 years from sometime in March 2023.

=== Security issues ===
- Around 2017-2018, experts discovered a security vulnerability that made ATI sirens vulnerable to hacking and false alarms. It was discovered in San Francisco, California, which is the reason they have been deactivated. ATI has made the relevant patches to fix this issue.

=== Business practices ===
The MSCSA siren, that was shown on ATI's website for a short period of time.

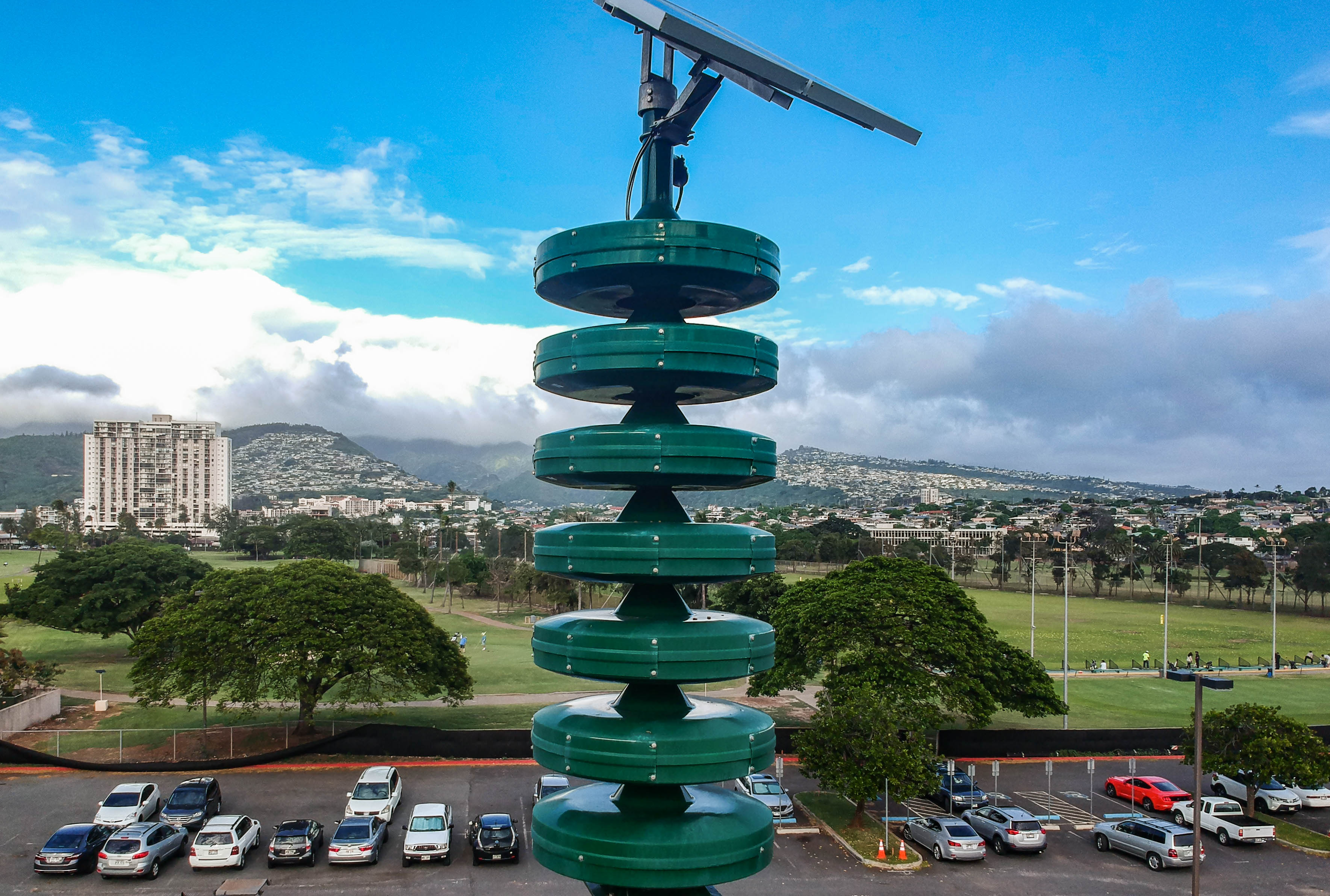
A Federal Signal modulator for comparison. The ATI picture is identical. Note: The Modulator shown has a different paint job than the default.

- In August 2022, ATI released a press release announcing the release of their new product, the Multiple Stacked Circular Speaker Array, which heavily resembled a Federal Signal Modulator. This was their second "attempt" at a modulator clone, as previously they released the same product under a different name; none have ever been installed.

== Customers ==
- San Francisco, California - Features the sound of the decommissioned Federal Signal STL-10 sirens that it replaced. In a period from 2004-2005, ATI replaced the system of STL-10's with ATI HPSS 16's and 32's. It was deactivated due to the threat of a cyber attack in 2019.
- Casitas Dam, Ventura, California - Looks like Federal Signal Directional Speaker Array (DSA) sirens, but can have 7–8 speakers per stack, and gray caps on the speaker cones.
- Indian Point Energy Center, New York
- Israel has 300 HPSS systems as a part of its warning system.
- Sedgwick County, Kansas and the City of Wichita use 27 ATI HPSS32 units.
- Forsyth County, Georgia has mostly ATI HPSS16R and ATI HPSS32 systems.
- Allen, Texas has 26 ATI HPSS32 units.
- Fort Riley, Kansas has 2 ATI HPSS16 units.
- Del City, Oklahoma has 8 ATI HPSS16 units.
- Malmstrom AFB, MT has 6 ATI HPSS16 units.
- Pasig, Philippines has 3 ATI HPSS32 units.
- Davao City, Philippines has at least 11 ATI HPSS32 units.
- Battle Creek, Michigan has four rotating ATI HPSS16R units.
- Menominee, Michigan has three early rotating ATI HPSS16R units
- Pensacola NAS, Florida, ATI HPSS16s mostly used for tornado warnings and play the colors
- University of West Florida In Pensacola, Florida, ATI HPSS16 sirens here are used for chemical spills, weather warnings, lock downs, and they play the Westminster Chimes.
- Arnold, Missouri 7 ATI HPSS32 units.
- Ketchikan, Alaska maintains a system of 3 ATI HPSS32 units.
- Hudson County, New Jersey has an unknown number of HPSS sirens.
- Chile, Antofagasta has an unknown number of HPSS32 sirens.
- Sarnia, Ontario and the surrounding communities use a system of 22 ATI HPSS32 units.
- Bandon, Oregon use 4 ATI HPSS32's.
- Palo Verde Nuclear Generating Station, Wintersburg, Arizona use over 70 HPSS32 sirens.
- Cannon Beach, Oregon Arch Cape, Oregon has 6 HPSS32 sirens
