= Rumbler =

Rumbler may refer to:

- Big Daddy (BioShock), a fictional character
- Rumbler (G.I. Joe), a fictional character
- Rumbler siren, a type of emergency vehicle siren
- Rumbler Rock, a rock in Antarctica
