= Sentry Siren =

American manufacturer and brand of civil defense sirens

- Formerly: Sterling Siren Fire Alarm Co.
- Type: Private
- Industry: Civil Defense Siren
- Founded: 1902; 124 years ago in Norwich, CT
- Headquarters: Penrose, Colorado, United States
- Area served: Most of North America
- Products: Civil defense sirens
- Total assets: $48B in investments
- Website: www.sentrysiren.com

Sentry Siren, formerly known as Sterling Siren Fire Alarm Corporation, is an American manufacturer and brand of civil defense sirens.

== History ==
Sentry Siren was founded as the Uncas Specialty Company of Norwich, Connecticut in the very early 20th century. The company would later rename itself to Interstate Machine Products Company in the late 1910s, then the Sterling Siren Fire Alarm Company in 1925.

The company began producing sirens in 1902, producing small scale vehicular sirens, before beginning large scale siren production with the Model M series of sirens beginning in 1917, designed by Merton C. Armstrong.

The Model M was used in fire warning, air-raid warning, and disaster warning and ended production in the 1980s to make way for a new line of sirens. The units were noted for their durability, with close to 1000 Model Ms being known to stand as of 2024; an estimated half of them still in service. Today, Model M units are considered collectibles by siren enthusiasts, due to rising rarity and historical value. Some other products that Sterling Siren produced were the "Little Giant", and the famous "Free-Rolling" and "Sirenlite" series of fire engine sirens.

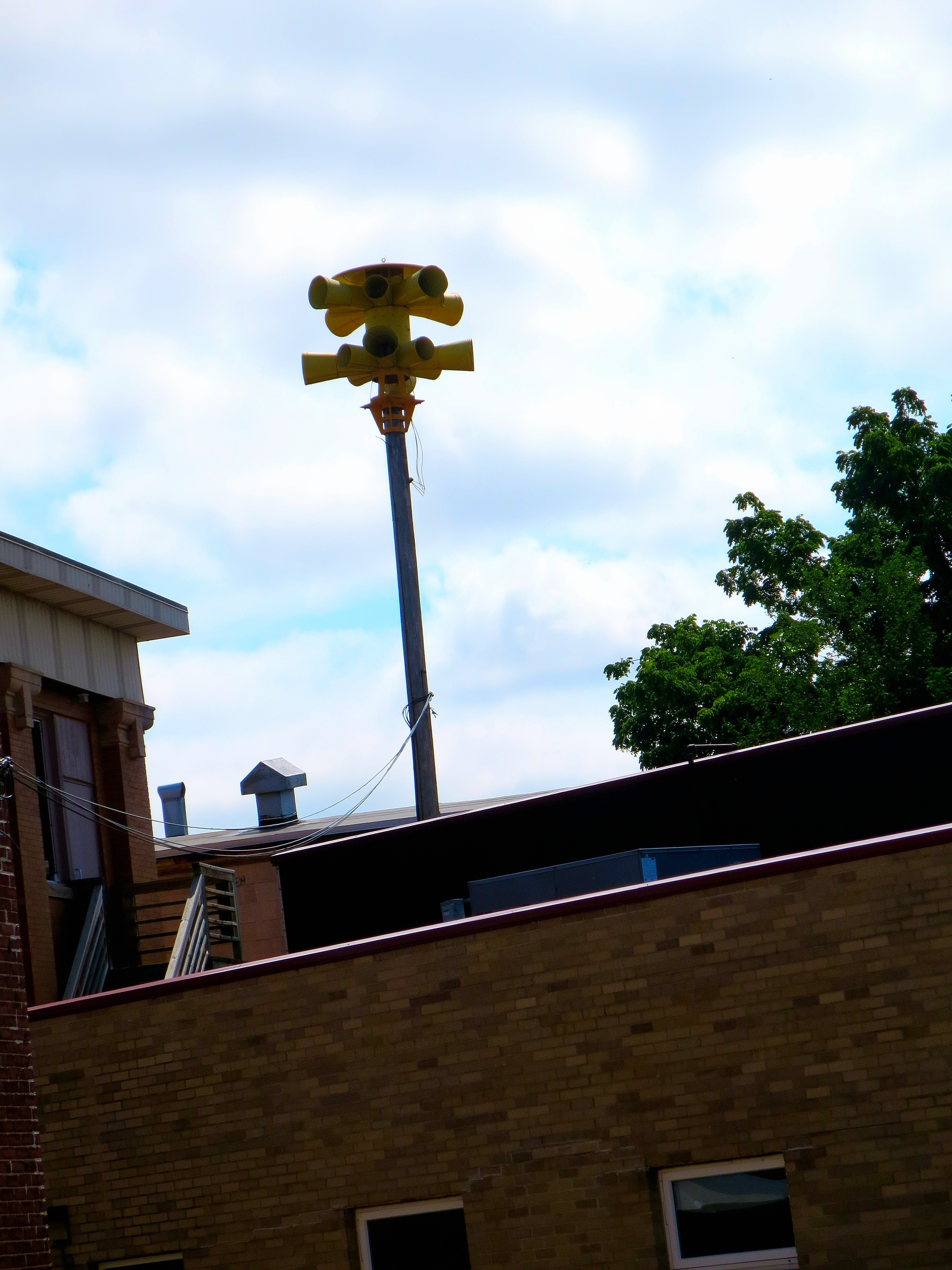
A Sentry 10V2T

In addition to sirens, Sterling Siren Fire Alarm sold fire alarm telegraph stations, automatic timers, weatherproof housings for outdoor siren control systems and an oscillating beacon for use on fire engines, designated the "Model 25 Oscilite".

In 1973, the Sterling Siren Fire Alarm Company went out of business and its designs were purchased by another company, known as the Sterling Siren Fire Alarm Corporation of Canon City, Colorado. Sterling Siren Fire Alarm Corp. would be renamed Sentry Siren, Incorporated some time before 1980.

In June 2020, the company relocated once more to a new production facility in Penrose, Colorado. The new production facility was built to increase office and manufacturing space for the growing company.

Also, on November 15, 2023, Sentry Siren was sold to two Colorado businessmen.

== See also ==
- Civil defense siren
- Civil defense
- Siren (alarm)
