= Georges Claude =

French engineer, inventor & Nazi collaborator (1870–1960)

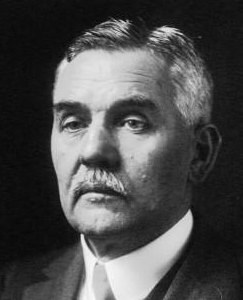
- Georges Claude in 1926
- Born: 24 September 1870; Paris, France
- Died: 23 May 1960 (aged 89); Saint-Cloud, France
- Known for: Claude cycle Neon lighting Ocean energy conversion
- Awards: Leconte Prize (1921)
- Scientific career
- Fields: Engineering

Georges Claude (24 September 1870 – 23 May 1960) was a French engineer and inventor. He is noted for his early work on the industrial liquefaction of air, for the invention and commercialization of neon lighting, and for a large experiment on generating energy by pumping cold seawater up from the depths. He has been considered by some to be "the Edison of France". The Claude process for manufacturing ammonia was named for him.

Claude was an active collaborator with the German occupiers of France during the Second World War, for which he was imprisoned in 1945 and stripped of his honors.

== Early life and career ==
Georges Claude was born on 24 September 1870 in Paris, France, during the city's siege by German forces.

Georges Claude studied at the École supérieure de physique et de chimie industrielles de la ville de Paris (ESPCI). He then held several positions. He was an electrical inspector in a cable factory and the laboratory manager in an electric works. He founded and edited a magazine, L'Étincelle Électrique (The Electric Spark); his important friendship with Jacques-Arsène d'Arsonval apparently dates from this time. About 1896, Claude learned of the explosion risk of bottled acetylene, which was used at the time for lighting. Acetylene is explosive when stored under pressure. Claude showed that acetylene dissolved well in acetone, equivalent to storing it under 25 atmospheres of pressure, reduced the risk in handling the gas.

== Liquefaction of air ==
In 1902 Claude devised what is now known as the Claude system for liquefying air. The system enabled the production of industrial quantities of liquid nitrogen, oxygen, and argon; Claude's approach competed successfully with the earlier system of Carl von Linde (1895). Claude and businessman Paul Delorme founded Air Liquide (L'Air Liquide), which is presently a large multinational corporation headquartered in Paris, France.

== Neon lighting ==
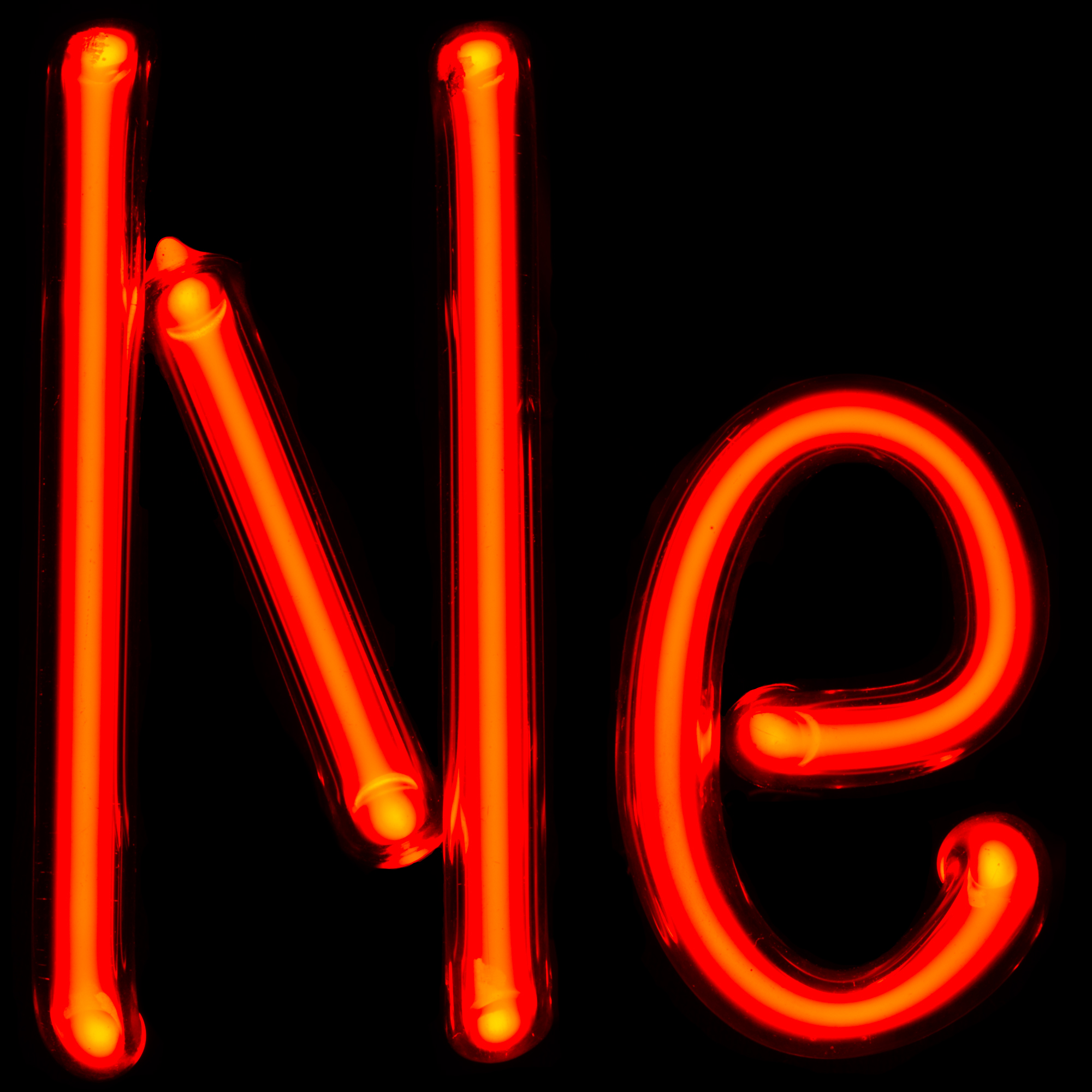
Gas discharge tube containing neon; "Ne" is the chemical symbol for neon.

Inspired by Geissler tubes and by Daniel McFarlan Moore's invention of a nitrogen-based light (the "Moore tube"), Claude developed neon tube lighting to exploit the neon that was produced as a byproduct of his air liquefaction business. These were all "glow discharge" tubes that generate light when an electric current is passed through the rarefied gas within the tube. Claude's first public demonstration of a large neon light was at the Paris Motor Show (Salon de l'Automobile et du Cycle), 3–18 December 1910. Claude's first patent filing for his technologies in France was on 7 March 1910. Claude himself wrote in 1913 that, in addition to a source of neon gas, there were two principal inventions that made neon lighting practicable. First were his methods for purifying the neon (or other inert gases such as argon). Claude developed techniques for purifying the inert gases within a completely sealed glass tube, which distinguished neon tube lighting from the Moore tubes; the latter had a device for replenishing the nitrogen or carbon dioxide gases within the tube. The second invention was ultimately crucial for the development of the Claude lighting business; it was a design for minimizing the degradation (by "sputtering") of the electrodes that transfer electric current from the external power supply to the glowing gases within the sign.

The terms "neon light" and "neon sign" are now often applied to electrical lighting incorporating sealed glass tubes filled with argon, mercury vapor, or other gases, in addition to neon. In 1915 a U.S. patent was issued to Claude covering the design of the electrodes for neon lights; this patent became the strongest basis for the monopoly held in the U.S. by his company, Claude Neon Lights, through the early 1930s.

Georges Claude and the French company he founded have long been said to have introduced neon signs to the United States by selling two to Earle C. Anthony, the owner of Packard car dealerships in San Francisco and Los Angeles (in 1923) but no conclusive evidence of this has ever been uncovered. Instead, photographs from 1923 to 1925 reveal a neon sign in Los Angeles, but not until 1925. A photograph of Anthony's San Francisco dealership may show a neon Packard sign in 1924 but is not conclusive. However, by 1924 Claude's company (Claude Neon) had opened subsidiaries or licensed patents to affiliated companies across the U.S. (such as Electrical Products Corporation, on the U.S. West Coast) and, though neon signage caught on only slowly, by the 1930s it was common across the U.S., eventually becoming, for a few decades, the country's dominant form of lit signage.

== Ocean thermal energy conversion ==
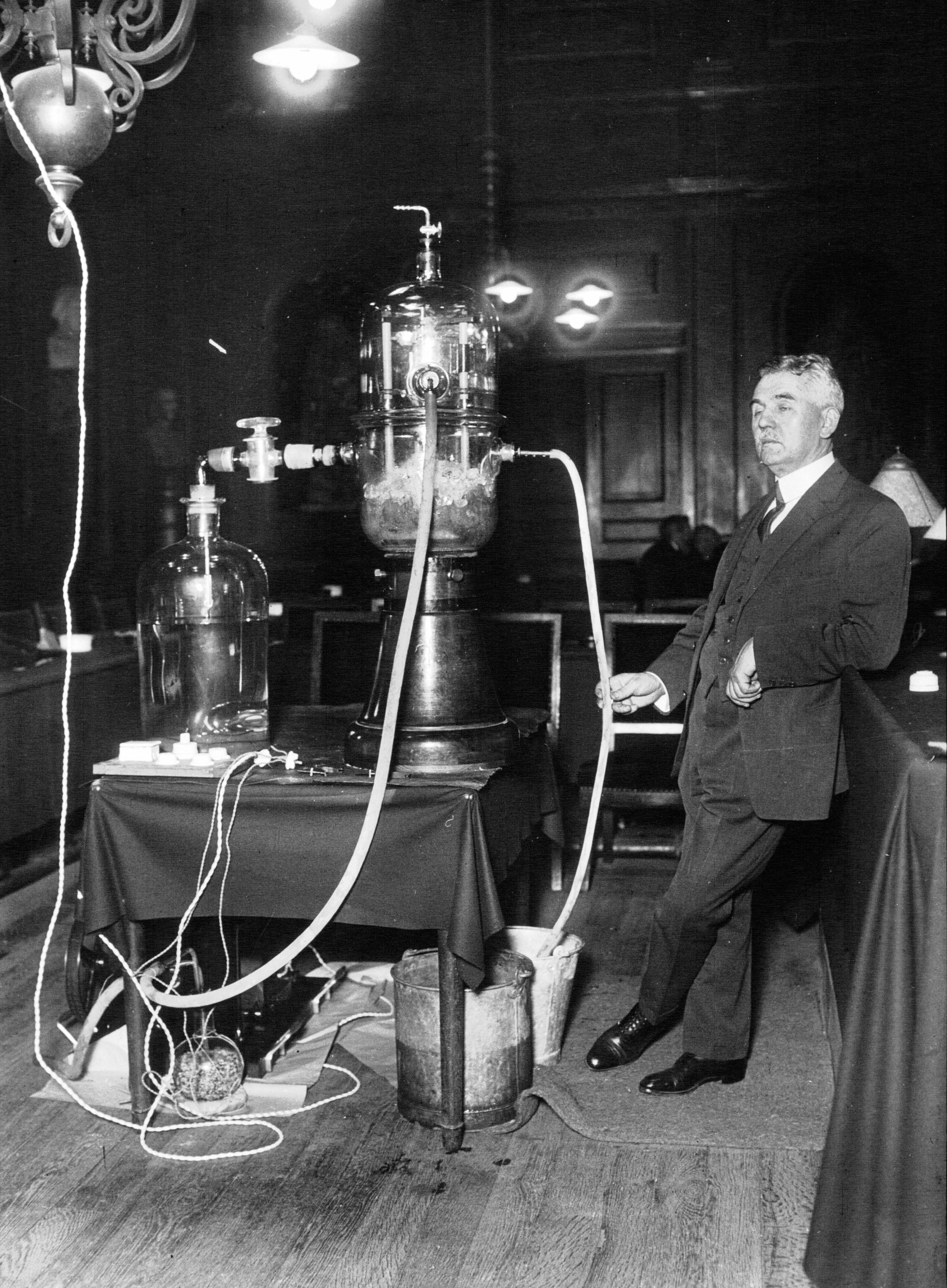
Georges Claude conducting a demonstration on ocean thermal energy conversion at the Institut de France in 1926.

Claude's mentor and friend was Jacques-Arsène d'Arsonval, the inventor of the "Ocean Thermal Energy Conversion" (OTEC) concept. Claude was also the first person to build prototype plants of that technology. Claude built his plant in Cuba in 1930. The system produced 22 kilowatts of electricity with a low-pressure turbine.

In 1935, Claude constructed another plant, this time aboard a 10,000-ton cargo vessel moored off the coast of Brazil. Weather and waves destroyed both plants before they could become net power generators. (Net power is the amount of power generated after subtracting power needed to run the system.)

== Wartime collaboration and post-war imprisonment ==
Even as a young engineer, Claude was unsympathetic to democratic rule. In 1933 he joined the Action Française, which favored restoration of a monarchy in France. He was a close friend of the monarchist leader Charles Maurras. Following the 1940 defeat of France by Germany at the beginning of the Second World War, the subsequent German occupation of northern France and establishment of the Vichy regime in the south, Claude publicly supported French collaboration with Germany. Among his other activities, he published several tracts supporting collaboration. He was a member of a Distinguished Committee of the Groupe Collaboration, which had been founded in September 1940. He was nominated by the Vichy regime as a member of the Conseil National Consultatif in 1941.

Following the Allied liberation of France in 1944, Claude was taken into custody on 2 December 1944 because of his collaboration with the Axis powers. He was removed from the French Academy of Sciences. In 1945 he was tried and convicted of propaganda work favoring collaboration, but was cleared of another charge that he helped design the V-1 flying bomb. He was condemned to life imprisonment, and was imprisoned. In 1950 he was released from prison, with acknowledgment of his research on ocean thermal energy conversion.

== Selected bibliography ==
Claude wrote several semi-popular descriptions of his research, in addition to his wartime tracts and a memoir.

- L'Électricité à la portée de tout le monde. Vve C. Dunod. 1901. Claude's first book, Electricity Made Accessible to Everyone, was a very popular exposition. It won the Prix Hébert de l’Académie des Sciences, and was translated into German. Christine Blondel writes of it, "In fact the success of the book was enormous. More than 60,000 copies were sold, nearly double the number of Jean Perrin's famous book, Les atomes."
- L'air liquide, sa production, ses propriétés, ses applications. Préface de d'Arsonval. Vve. C. Dunod. 1903. Liquid Air: Its production, its properties, and its applications, published shortly after the founding of Air Liquide.
- Liquid air, oxygen, nitrogen. Introduction by d'Arsonval. P. Blakiston's Son & Co. 1913. Translated by Henry E. P. Cottrell from Air liquide, oxygène, azote. Préface de d'Arsonval. H. Dunod et E. Pinat. 1909.
- Sur l'utilisation de l'énergie thermique des mers. Institut Océanographique. 1926.. Bulletin, No. 486. On the Utilization of the Thermal Energy of the Seas.
- Ma bataille contre la vie chère. A. Fayard. 1939. My Battle Against the High Cost of Living. La vie chère literally refers to "dear life" (expensive living). It was an obsession of interwar France (1919–1939).
- Ma vie et mes inventions. Plon. 1957. My Life and My Inventions, Claude's autobiography, published a few years before his death in 1960.
