= Electrical Products Corporation =

Electric sign manufacturer

The Electrical Products Corporation (EPCO) was a major producer of electric signs, especially neon signs, in the western region of the United States. Electrical Products Corp. was established in Los Angeles, incorporated on November 7, 1912. By 1923, EPCO had acquired the rights to the neon patents of neon light inventor Georges Claude and began the manufacture of neon lighting and signs. In 1928, it was renamed Claude Neon Electrical Products Corporation, but by 1939 "Claude" had been dropped from the name after a reorganization.

In 1962, the company was acquired by and merged into the Federal Sign and Signal Corporation, of Chicago.
