= Scend Rocks =

Coordinates: 64°48′S 64°15′W

Scend Rocks is a small group of rocks lying 1.5 nautical miles (2.8 km) southwest of Rumbler Rock and 2.5 nautical miles (4.6 km) west-northwest of Outcast Islands, off the southwest coast of Anvers Island in the Palmer Archipelago. Surveyed by the British Naval Hydrographic Survey Unit in 1956–57, and named by the United Kingdom Antarctic Place-Names Committee (UK-APC) in 1958. Scend is a nautical term describing the horizontal forward and backward flow of sea water breaking over a shallow obstruction, caused by the incoming ocean swell.

== Sources ==
- John Stewart (1990). "Scend Rocks". Antarctica: An Encyclopedia. McFarland & Company. p. 877. ISBN 9780899505985.
