= Rumbler siren =

Emergency vehicle siren

Rumbler siren

A Rumbler siren is a type of emergency vehicle siren used primarily in the United States and Canada.

Developed in 2007 by Federal Signal Corporation, and sounding at a low-frequency level, it is designed to be heard by motorists who may otherwise be unable to hear high-frequency sirens due to ambient noise, such as urban traffic.

== Design ==
The Rumbler produces a pulsating, low-frequency sound between 182 and 400 hertz, and is operated in tandem with a standard, piercing high-frequency siren. The lower frequency sound penetrates hard surfaces like glass and doors more effectively than high-frequency tones. In addition, the siren's low-frequency thumping sound also causes noticeable vibrations to drivers and pedestrians who are near it and helps to generate attention in high-noise environments like dense urban traffic. The Rumbler is about 10 decibels quieter than a standard emergency vehicle siren and is generally activated in eight-second bursts by depressing the horn button in a Rumbler-equipped vehicle.

== History ==
The Rumbler was developed by Federal Signal Corporation as an "intersection clearing device". It was initially tested by the New York Police Department in 2007.

According to Noise Off, a noise pollution advocacy group, more than 100 U.S. police departments had deployed the siren by 2012, including those of: Washington, D.C.; Amarillo, Texas; Tulsa, Oklahoma; and Reading, Pennsylvania. As of 2016, the per-unit cost of the siren was between US$400 and $700 (equivalent to between US$537 and $939 in 2025).

In 2015, emergency vehicles in New South Wales, Australia, were outfitted with Rumbler sirens and, the following year, some ambulances in Singapore began to be equipped with the Rumbler. According to Singapore officials, the decision to adopt the Rumbler came after seeing its efficacy in U.S. police vehicles.

Wales Air Ambulance's response vehicles are now equipped with the rumbler siren. This is the third application of such equipment in the UK, having only previously been used by another response doctor charity in Hampshire and by the charity MedServe Wales on their previous team response vehicle. In 2023, more UK police services began to have their cars outfitted with Rumbler sirens, as the siren's low frequency produces a tactile effect that allows drivers to be clearly alerted to the siren's presence, even in modern cars with extensive soundproofing which would otherwise block out most of the sound.

"Rumbler" was a nominee for "People's Choice Award Word of the Year" for 2016 by the Macquarie Dictionary.

New vehicles operated by the Queensland Ambulance Service are fitted with a Rumbler siren.

== See also ==
- Noise pollution
- The Hum
