= Q2B =

Siren made by Federal Signal Corporation

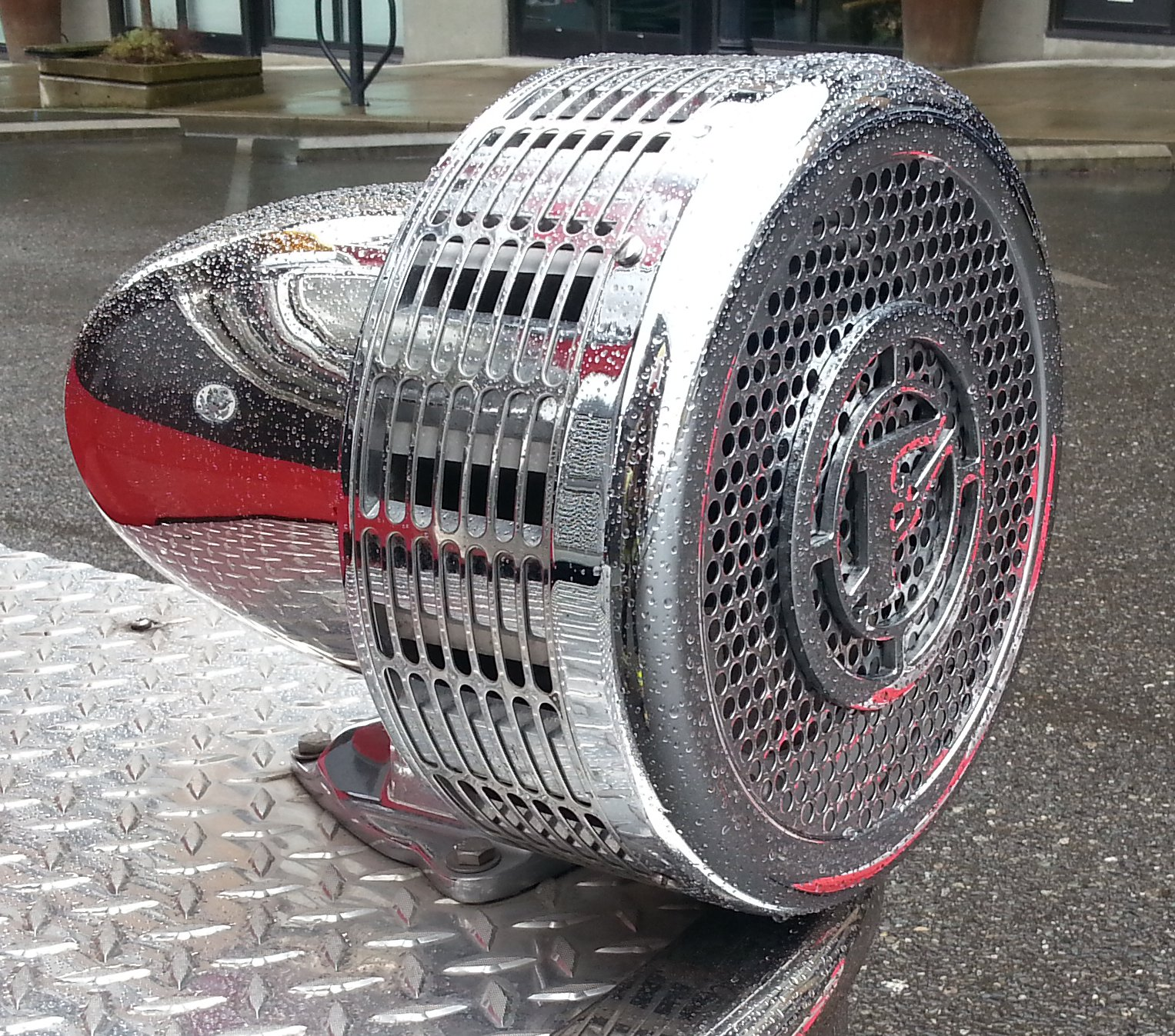
This Q2B or "Q-siren" is mounted on a Pierce Platform Aerial Fire Truck owned by the City of Bellingham, WA.

The Q2B (Q-siren) is an electromechanical siren produced by the Federal Signal Corporation. The majority of users of the Q-siren are fire departments, although some ambulances and heavy rescue squads have employed the Q-siren, along with some VFDs using them as fire warning sirens (before pagers were made), or municipalities which might rarely use them as outdoor warning sirens. The Q2B is mounted outside the fire truck, usually in the front bumper, on top of an extended front bumper or on the grille. Roof-mounting is no longer common due to noise in the cab. Some departments, including the New York City Fire Department, have stopped using the siren due to its loud volume, which has led to it being replaced by electronic versions such as the e-Q2B.
