= Directional siren =

Type of alert siren

A directional siren is a siren with a bandwidth broader than 500 Hz-1.8 kHz that enables listeners to more quickly locate the source of the sound. Generally, sound localization accuracy is within 5 degrees, but enabling improved accuracy, for example in an ambulance siren, can lead to faster identification and response, thus enabling an ambulance to reach its destination faster and increase the chance of saving lives. Other benefits of directional sirens are reducing the potential health threat to vehicle occupants, and reducing the risk of accidents from startled vehicles nearby the siren. Another benefit of a directional siren is noise pollution reduction, since the siren will be heard only by those who need to hear it.

== See also ==
- Siren (alarm)
- Sound localization
