= Federal Signal 3T22/2T22 =

Warning sirens made by Federal Signal Corporation

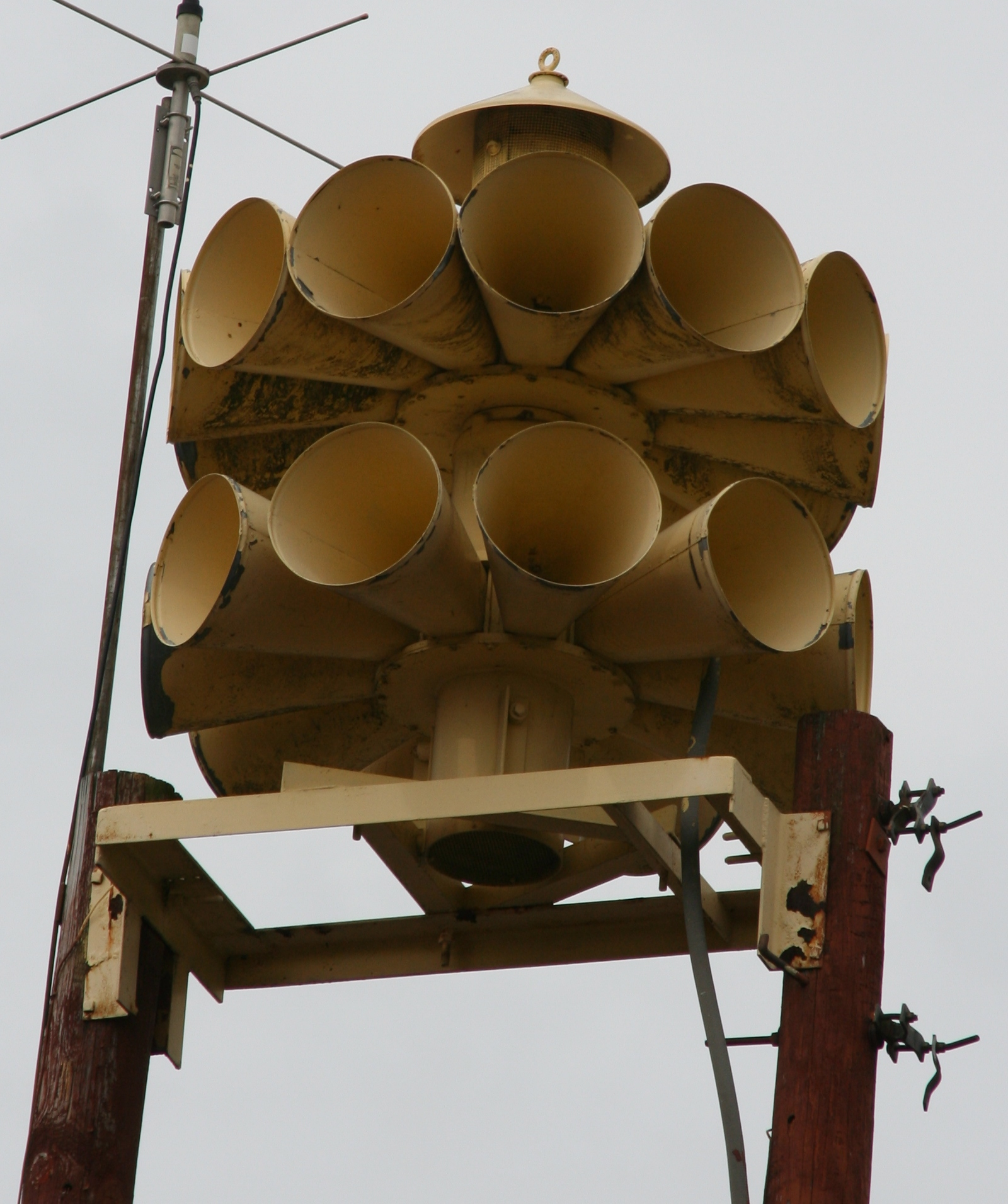
A Federal Signal 2T22 siren

The Federal Signal 3T22 and 2T22 are dual-tone, mechanical outdoor warning sirens made by Federal Signal Corporation (formerly Federal Sign and Signal Corporation) from 1952 through the early 1990s. Both have a very recognizable design, with a ten-port rotor (chopper) on the bottom with ten cones (horns) and a 12-port one on top with twelve cones.

== History ==
The Federal Signal 3T22 was originally designed as the 2T22 in 1952 or 1954. The 2T22 has the same number of ports and cones as the 3T22. The 2T22 can produce two main signals (the other signals are rarely used), hence the name "2T22" (the 2 at front representing the 2 choppers, and the 22 representing the number of horns). The 2T22 has no solenoids, so it cannot perform a "hi-lo" signal. In 1955, Federal designed the 3T22, with its main differences from the 2T22 being its name and the addition of solenoids/dampers. The solenoids allow the 3T22 to perform the "hi-lo" signal, which is mainly used for fire calls. The 2T22 and 3T22 can both produce 113-116db (measured 100 feet away from the siren). There are four models of this type of siren: the 2T22 A and B and the 3T22 A and B. In the name 3T22, the 3 stands for its three main signals: attack (wail), alert (steady), and hi-lo, and the 22 again stands for the 22 cones/horns. The A or B determines whether the motor is three phase or single phase. A 3/2T22A is three phase, while a 3/2T22B is single phase. The siren was mainly used for air raid warnings during the Cold War era and weather warnings such as Tornados after the war. In the early 1990s, the siren's production was halted when it was replaced with the newer 2001-SRN and later the Eclipse 8, of which the 2001 can reach 126db, hence the name. Like many other older siren models, these sirens are becoming less common due to towns upgrading to more powerful sirens. Many sirens are refurbished by enthusiasts or installed for lower-income towns that need sirens.

== Design ==
The 3T22 & 2T22 only came in one port ratio: 10/12. It has 10 ports and cones on the bottom and 12 ports and cones on the top. It also has a smaller cone on top to reduce rain and other water-related substances such as snow from getting inside. The 3T22 has two solenoid boxes, one on top, and one on the bottom. The 2T22/3T22 are also two air intake spots: also one on the top and bottom. The siren has a small stand with three legs so it can be mounted on a pole or roof. The stand can be removed and the siren can be mounted differently.
