= Rumbler Rock =

Rumbler Rock (64°47′S 64°13′W) is a rock lying 3.5 nautical miles (6 km) west of Bonaparte Point, off the southwest coast of Anvers Island in the Palmer Archipelago of Antarctica. Surveyed by the British Naval Hydrographic Survey Unit in 1956–57. So named by the United Kingdom Antarctic Place-Names Committee (UK-APC) because with the prevailing heavy southwest swell, the noise of seas breaking over the rock may be heard well clear of the danger.

== See also ==
- Scend Rocks
