= Federal Signal SiraTone =

Outdoor warning sirens

SiraTone Electronic Outdoor Warning Siren
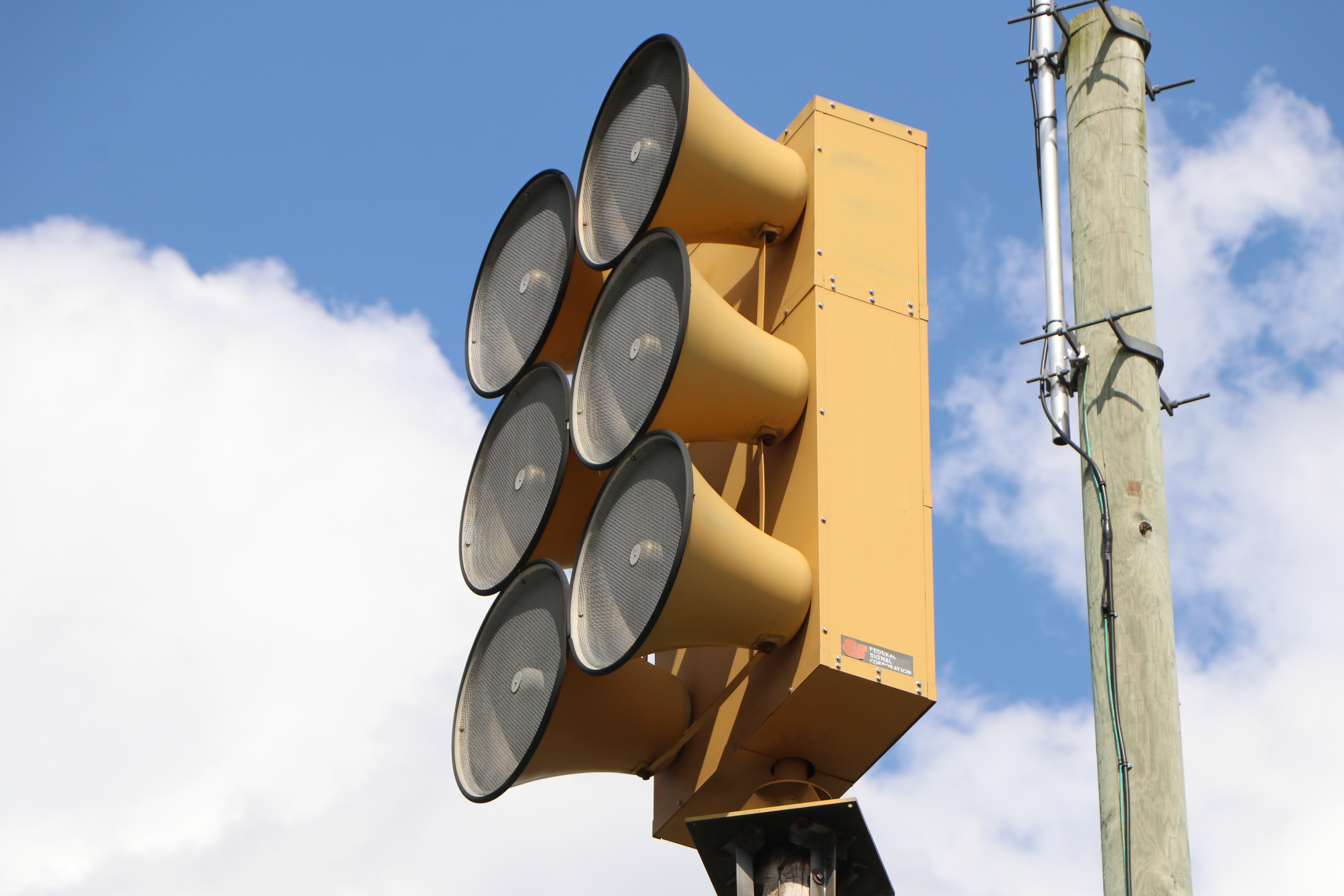
- A SiraTone model EOWS*612 located in Battle Creek, Michigan.
- Type: Outdoor warning siren
- Inventor: Joel G. Lacono, Ronald J. Koval
- Manufacturer: Federal Signal Corporation
- Available: 1981–2007
- Models: EOWS* M12, 115, Prototype 1212, 408, 612, 812, 1212

SiraTone is a defunct variety of electronic outdoor warning sirens produced by Federal Signal Corporation beginning in the early 1980s. These sirens were designed to broadcast high-intensity warning signals over large areas for public safety applications. SiraTone systems were used for natural disaster notification, HAZMAT incident alerts, fire call systems, and other emergency warning purposes.

The SiraTone product line is no longer in production. It was succeeded by the Modulator series and Directional Speaker Array (DSA) electronic outdoor warning systems.

== Products ==
Six primary models of outdoor warning sirens were produced under the SiraTone brand. Model numbers are designated by the prefix EOWS (Electronic Outdoor Warning Siren), followed by an asterisk and a number representing the siren's power output or speaker configuration. All models utilize re-entrant speaker horns, arrays of 100-watt speaker drivers, and electronic tone generation.

- EOWS*115 – The first SiraTone model produced; a 1200-watt omnidirectional siren equipped with 12 vertical Atlas Sound CJ-44 speaker horns.
- EOWS*1212 – A 1200-watt omnidirectional siren and updated version of the EOWS*115, using 12 circular University Sound DR-42 speaker horns.
- Prototype EOWS 1212 – A prototype version of the 1212 with minor design differences, utilizing 12 Atlas CJ-44 speaker horns.
- EOWS*408 – An 800-watt rotating siren with 4 circular University Sound DR-42 speaker horns; discontinued along with the EOWS*812 in favor for the EOWS*612.
- EOWS*612 – A 1200-watt rotating siren with 6 circular University Sound DR-42 speaker horns; the most widely produced model in the SiraTone series.
- EOWS*812 – A 1200-watt rotating siren with 8 circular University Sound DR-42 speaker horns; later discontinued and effectively replaced by the EOWS*612.

A mobile, vehicle-mounted variant known as the EOWS*M12 was also proposed, though it is believed that few or none were manufactured.

An advertisement for the SiraTone EOWS*408 and 812 sirens.

== Signals ==
SiraTone sirens are capable of producing multiple warning tones:

- Alert – A steady siren tone.
- Wail – A rising and falling siren tone.
- Alternating steady – A tone alternating between high and low frequencies at half-second intervals, similar to European emergency vehicle sirens.
- Alternating wail – A wail tone alternating between high and low frequencies.
- Pulsed wail – A pulsating wail tone at half-second intervals.
- Pulsed steady – A pulsating steady tone at half-second intervals.
- Whoop – A repeating rising tone that cycles continuously.
- Auxiliary tone – A customizable tone selectable by the operator.
- Westminster chimes – A non-emergency chime tone used for testing.
- Yeow - A Rising tone that descends in pitch that repeats continuously.

A distinctive feature of the SiraTone series was its ability to perform routine tests using a Westminster chime melody instead of traditional alarm tones. This allowed municipalities to verify system functionality without causing public alarm. Additional tones could be programmed upon request.

== Gallery ==
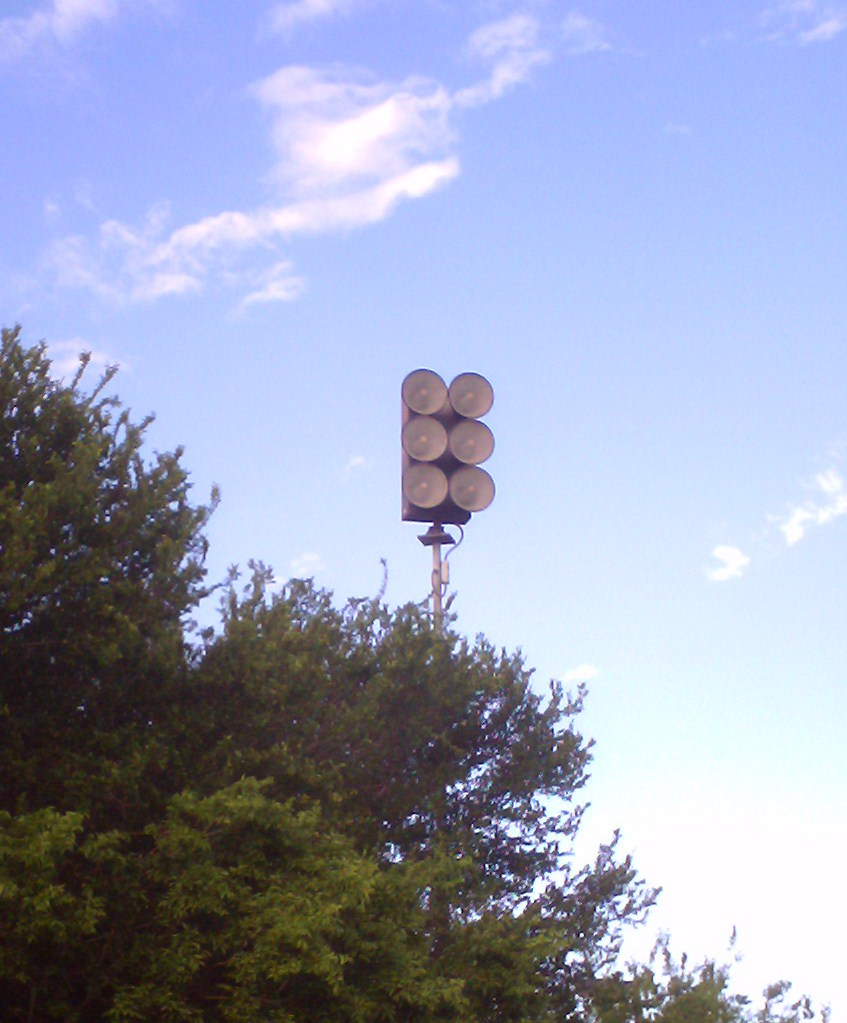
Model EOWS*612 in Irving, Texas. It has since been replaced with a 508.

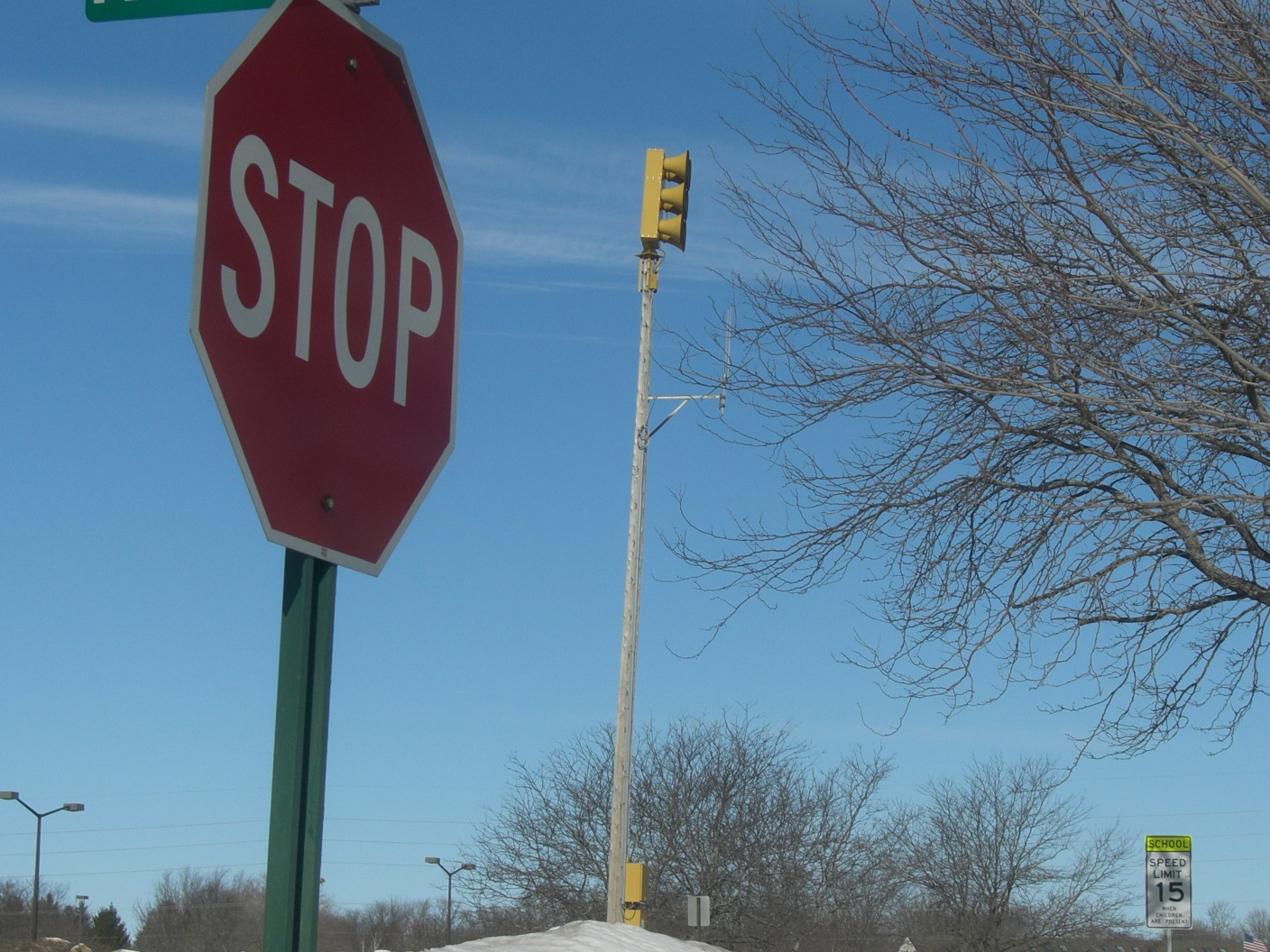
Model EOWS*612 in civil defense yellow livery. *Replaced*

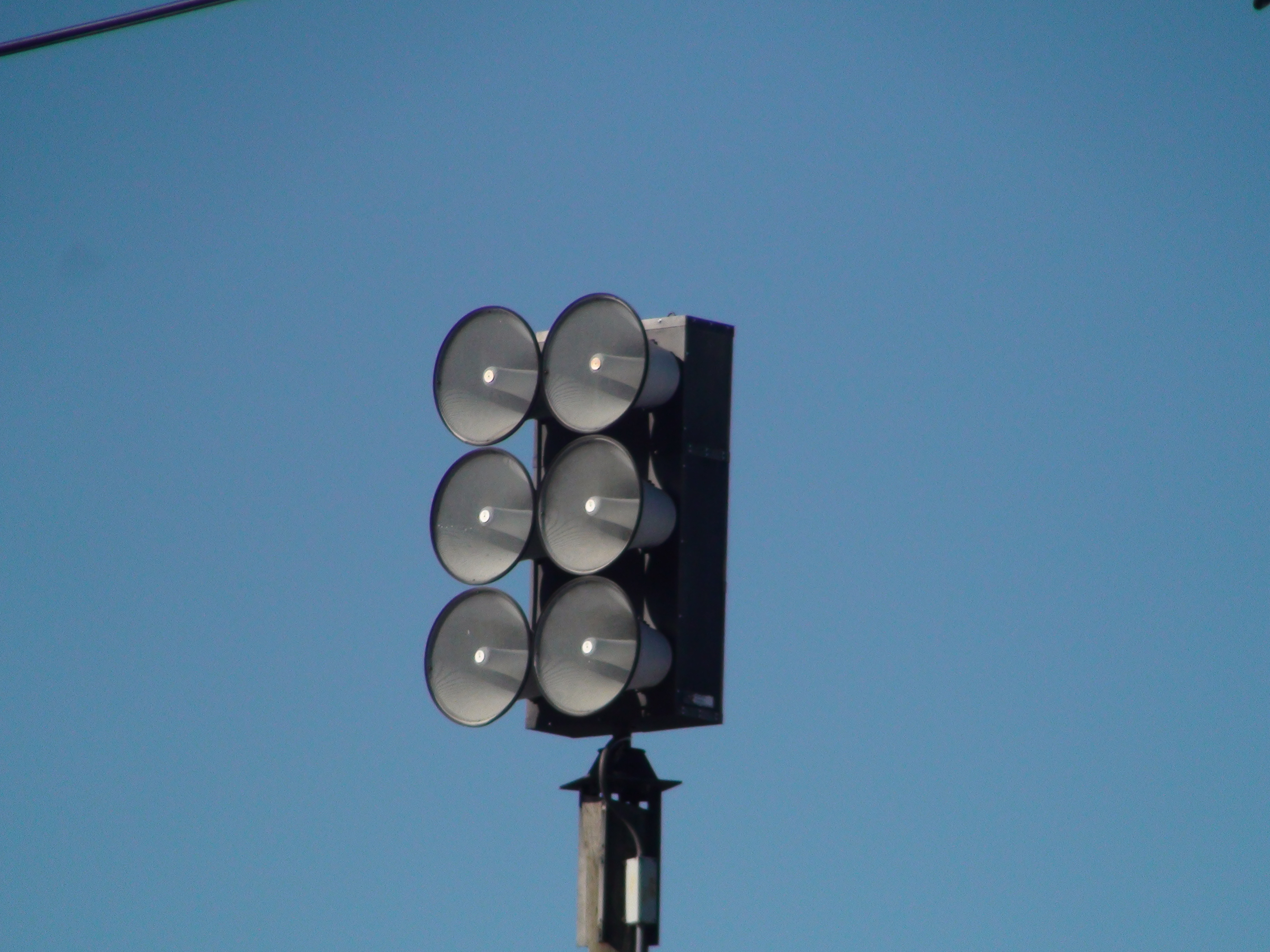
Model EOWS*612 near a train station; later removed and reportedly preserved by an enthusiast as of July 2025.
