= Federal Signal Modulator =

Electronic public warning siren

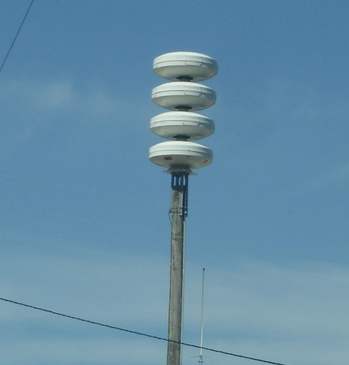
A Federal Signal Modulator siren in Bay Head, New Jersey.

Federal Signal Modulators (also known as Modulator Speaker Array) are electronic warning devices produced by Federal Signal Corporation that are used to alert the public about tornadoes, severe weather, earthquakes, fires, lahars, tsunamis, or any other disaster. They are identified mostly by their distinctive stacked "flying saucer" design. The Modulator II is sold based on the more compact chassis of the siren compared to the original Modulators.

== Description ==
The Modulator is composed of speaker cells (ranging from two to eight, with the exception of seven) that contain four speaker drivers (speakers) per cell, although two models (MOD6032 and MOD6048) had additional drivers available when they were still produced. Modulators have an inactive (dummy) speaker cell on the bottom of the stack that is used to help project sound in all directions. Due to the design of active cells, there would be unbalanced sound distribution without the inactive cell. Modulators that are being made now use the UltraVoice (UV) controller. When they were first made, they were used with Modulator Control Plus (MCP) and basic/standard Modulator Controls (MC).

=== Models ===
Modulator model numbers identify the number of active cells, as well as the number of drivers. The first family of modulator arrays consisted of eighteen different models: the MOD1004, MOD2008, MOD3012, MOD3024, MOD4016, MOD5020, MOD6024, MOD6032, MOD6048, MOD1004B, MOD2008B, MOD3012B, MOD3024B, MOD4016B, MOD5020B, MOD6024B, MOD6032B, and MOD6048B. The "B" suffix is not only used for the Modulator II lineup, but on the original series it means the cells are fiberglass instead of aluminum.

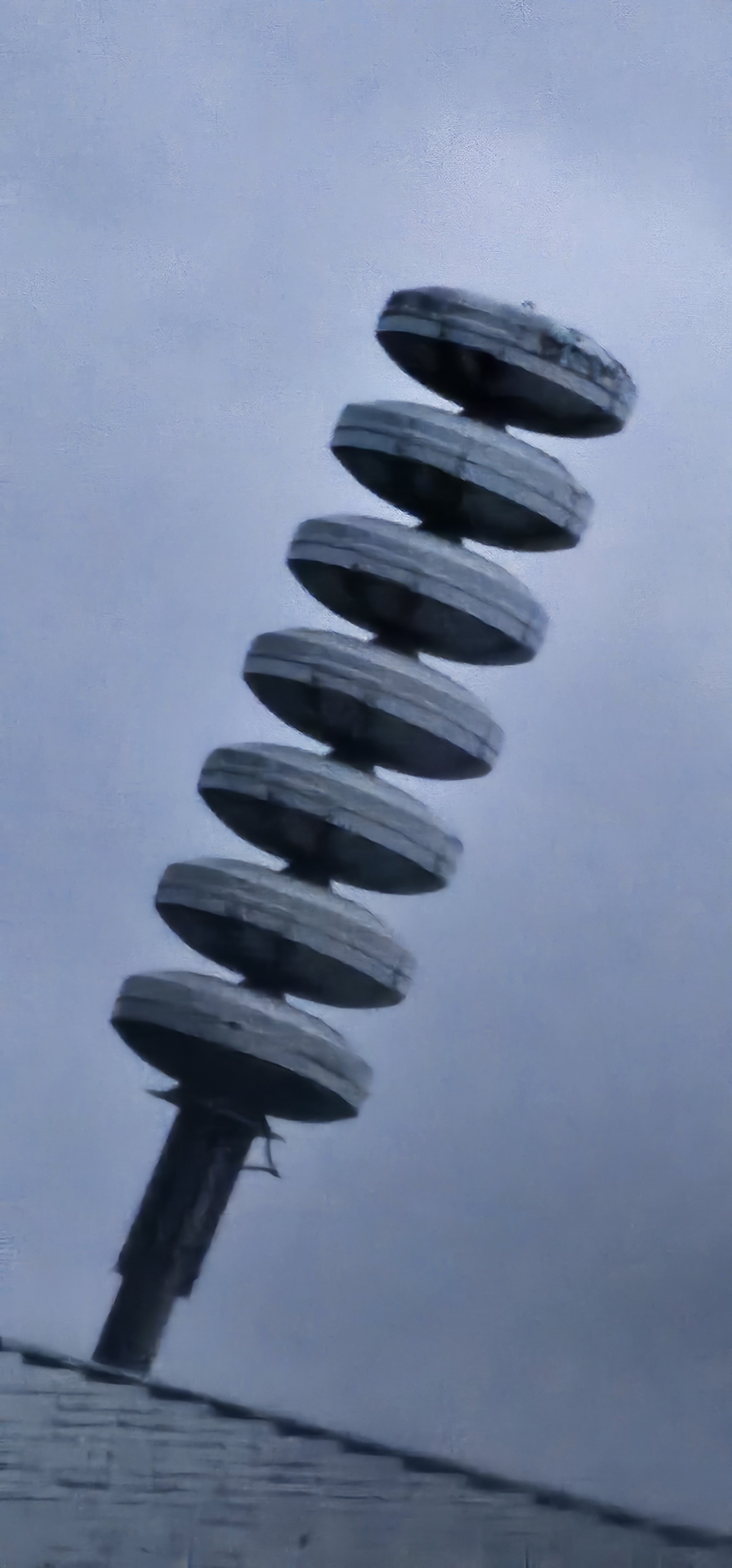
A Federal Signal Modulator MOD6024.

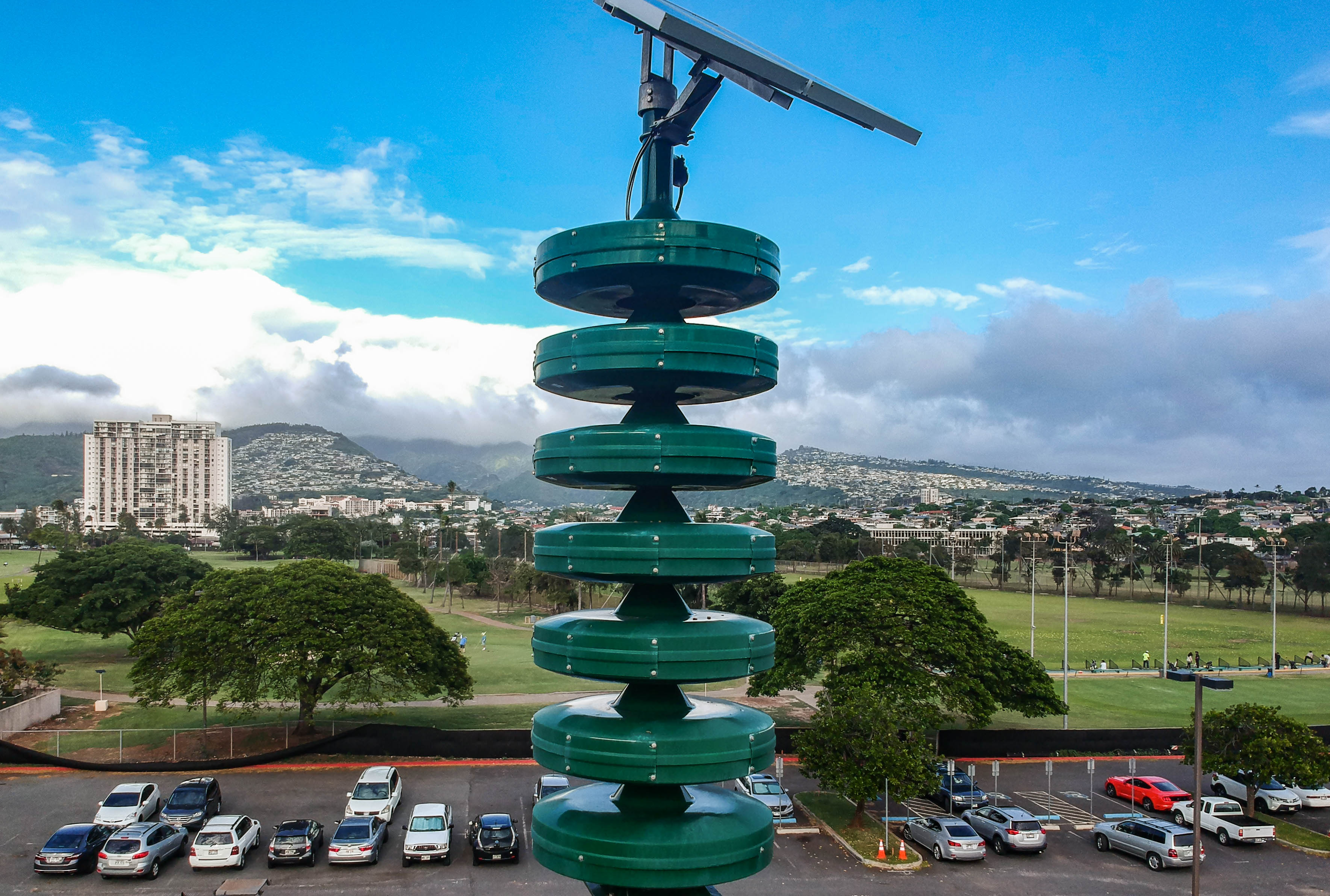
A Federal Signal Modulator II MOD6024B in Hawaii.

In January 2013, Federal Signal released the Modulator II sirens, consisting of the II MOD1004B, II MOD2008B, II MOD3012B, II MOD4016B, II MOD4032B, II MOD5020B, II MOD6024B, II MOD6032B and II MOD8032B models. They provide the same alerting technology as the original Modulator, with the exception of a smaller compact chassis and cylindrical modules instead of elliptical ones.

=== Warning tones ===
Similar to Federal Signal's previous Electronic Outdoor Warning Siren series, the Modulator can produce seven standard warning tones. The seven standard tones are Wail, Alternate Wail, Pulsed Wail, Steady, Alternate Steady, Pulsed Steady and Westminster Chimes. If properly equipped, the Modulator can also employ voice notification to give specific information or to give a more clear understanding of an emergency situation. They have also been known to play The Star-Spangled Banner during tests on or near the 4th of July, and also on military bases.

The sirens can be activated by radio using single tone, two-tone, DTMF, MSK or POCSAG over analog, digital and trunking systems, or by satellite, cellular, landline or IP. They are also capable of being activated automatically by the Emergency Alert System.

=== Similar devices ===
The Modulator has a similar setup to the Whelen WPS-2700, WPS-2800, WPS-2900, Firehouse (FHS), and Omni-Alert (OA) omnidirectional speaker arrays. The Whelen arrays have single driver cells, while Modulators have multi-driver cells. The American Signal I-Force siren, which uses stacked, elliptical speaker cells that provide omnidirectional sound output, is also similar to the Modulator.

== Notable locations ==
=== South Africa ===
Additionally, in Cape Town, South Africa, several Modulator sirens are installed which use their standard wail tone to alert citizens in the Melkbosstrand, Duynefontein, Blaauwberg, Table View, Robben Island, Atlantis, Philadelphia and Parklands areas in case of any emergency which can occur at the Koeberg Nuclear Power Station. These Modulators are tested for about an hour annually on the first Wednesday of March during a so-called "Full Volume Siren Test" using a preset female voice (which reads "This is only a test; there is no need to take any action. This is only a test; there is no need to take any action. I repeat: this is only a test; there is no need to take any action. Listen to Good Hope FM or Kfm for further information") and live voice announcements (which are read by people and are often cite similar things said by the preset voice), other than the typical wail tone of the Modulator.

=== United Kingdom ===
Severn Estuary has a system of Modulator and DSA sirens. The system runs on both UltraVoice and MCP Controllers. They have very different tones compared to the American ones, potentially custom. The system is activated by radio signal at Avon and Somerset Police headquarters.

=== United States ===
Manasquan, New Jersey has a system of MOD3012s and MOD6024s. They are similar to the Chicago siren system because they use the rare signal, alternate wail, but after, it includes a voice message that says “THIS IS A HURRICANE WARNING! TUNE YOUR AM RADIO TO 1620.” the message repeats at least a few times and then plays the signal.

Little Silver, New Jersey has a system of two MOD2008s and one MOD3012. They were installed in 1999 and are unique because they play off a custom air horn recording rather than the standard UV/MCP files, to mimic the Diaphone system installed at the firehouse prior to installation of the Modulators. These sirens replaced a Federal Signal SD-10 and a Model 2. These sirens are used for calls, funerals, Santa escorts, flooding, curfews, blackouts, and natural disasters such as hurricanes and tornadoes. However as of 2025, they have been updated to a new shorter tone due to most likely a blown sound file in the longer original tone from 1999.

Point Pleasant Beach, New Jersey has a MOD3012 that plays off a Gamewell Diaphone recording in addition to a custom attack tone used primarily for calls even though Point Pleasant Beach never had a Gamewell Diaphone. However, the 3012 got replaced with a 3012b in January 2024 so it is unclear if it still has that tone.

==== Oklahoma ====
The city of Moore, Oklahoma is well known for their Modulators being placed closer together in comparison to other cities. They are placed only a half-mile from each other in some parts of the city. Until 2017, some sirens ran on a major third dual-tone alert.

==== South Carolina ====
Clemson University has a system of MOD5020s, MOD4016s and 2001s. They test at the same schedule as the city of Clemson, South Carolina’s siren system for the nearby power plant. When testing, the modulators normally play a voice that says “THIS IS A TEST OF THE CAMPUS EMERGENCY ALERT SYSTEM. THIS IS ONLY A TEST.” which is followed by attack mode. When a thunderstorm is detected, the modulators sound in hi-lo followed by a voice that says “LIGHTNING WARNING! CLOUD TO GROUND LIGHTNING IS EXPECTED IN THE AREA. PLEASE SEEK SHELTER IMMEDIATELY!” When a tornado warning occurs, the Modulators sound in attack, followed by a voice warning that says “A TORNADO WARNING HAS BEEN ISSUED FOR CLEMSON UNIVERSITY. PLEASE SEEK SHELTER IMMEDIATELY!” The system is not only used for tornadoes, and severe storms, therefore, it is also used in case of an emergency at the power plant nearby the facility. All of the Modulators are ran on UltraVoice controllers.

==== Washington ====
There are 42 Federal Signal Modulators that are a part of the Mount Rainier Volcano Warning System. If Mount Rainier erupts and causes a mudslide, acoustic flow monitors (AFM) will detect the rumbling and send a notification to the Pierce County Office of Emergency Management. Once the notification is sent, all 42 sirens will sound, using the Wail tone. They will continue to wail until the batteries die or the lahar destroys the sirens. Also, The Concrete, Washington area has a system of eight MOD8032Bs to warn of possible breaches at the Baker River Dam. The system uses a distinctive "WHOOP" tone that was originally produced for Federal Signal's line of fire alarms. The system is tested on the second Monday of every month at 6:00pm.

== Controllers ==
Several controllers were made to run the Modulator sirens. These include the MC (Modulator Controller), MCP (Modulator Power Plus Controller), and UV (UltraVoice). The older SiraTone controller can also run on Modulator sirens but the SiraTone was mainly used on the predecessor EOWS Series sirens. All of the controllers built for the Modulators can be compatible with the Predecessor EOWS sirens, the Successor Modulator II sirens, and the DSA sirens. The Modulator II series started production in 2013 and the older Modulators started production in 1991. The reason why the EOWS sirens can be compatible with these controllers is because the EOWS*408, 812, 115, and 1212 lasted production until 2001. The EOWS*612 was kept in production only on special order until August 3, 2007. All 3 controllers were being made or were made at the time so Federal Signal decided to make the EOWS sirens compatible with these controllers.

=== MCP (Modulator Power Plus Controller) ===
The MCP or Modulator Power Plus Controller was somewhat identical to the MC, but with a few additions. More signals could be generated through the tone generator, and it could also be activated by Federal Signal's FSK (Frequency Shifting Keys) activation tones. Nothing else changed between the MC and the MCP. The MCP was discontinued around 2002 for the newest version of the series, the UV controller.

=== UV (UltraVoice) ===
The UV or UltraVoice Controller is the newest electronic siren controller made by Federal Signal. It now is compatible with the newer type Modulators, the Modulator II series which started production in 2013. The UltraVoice comes in 2 variants: UV and UVIC. The UV is for outdoor use with large speaker arrays like the Modulator, where the UVIC is for indoor use with small speakers and/or intercom systems. UV is capable of holding up to 8 UV400 400 Watt amplifiers, for a total of 3200W. The UV comes standard with 7 signals: Steady, Wail, Alternate Steady, Alternate Wail, Pulsed Steady, Pulsed Wail, and Westminster Chimes. It is offered from the factory in Single or Dual tone, however it is easily changeable after purchase.
