= Federal Signal Thunderbolt =

Outdoor acoustical warning device

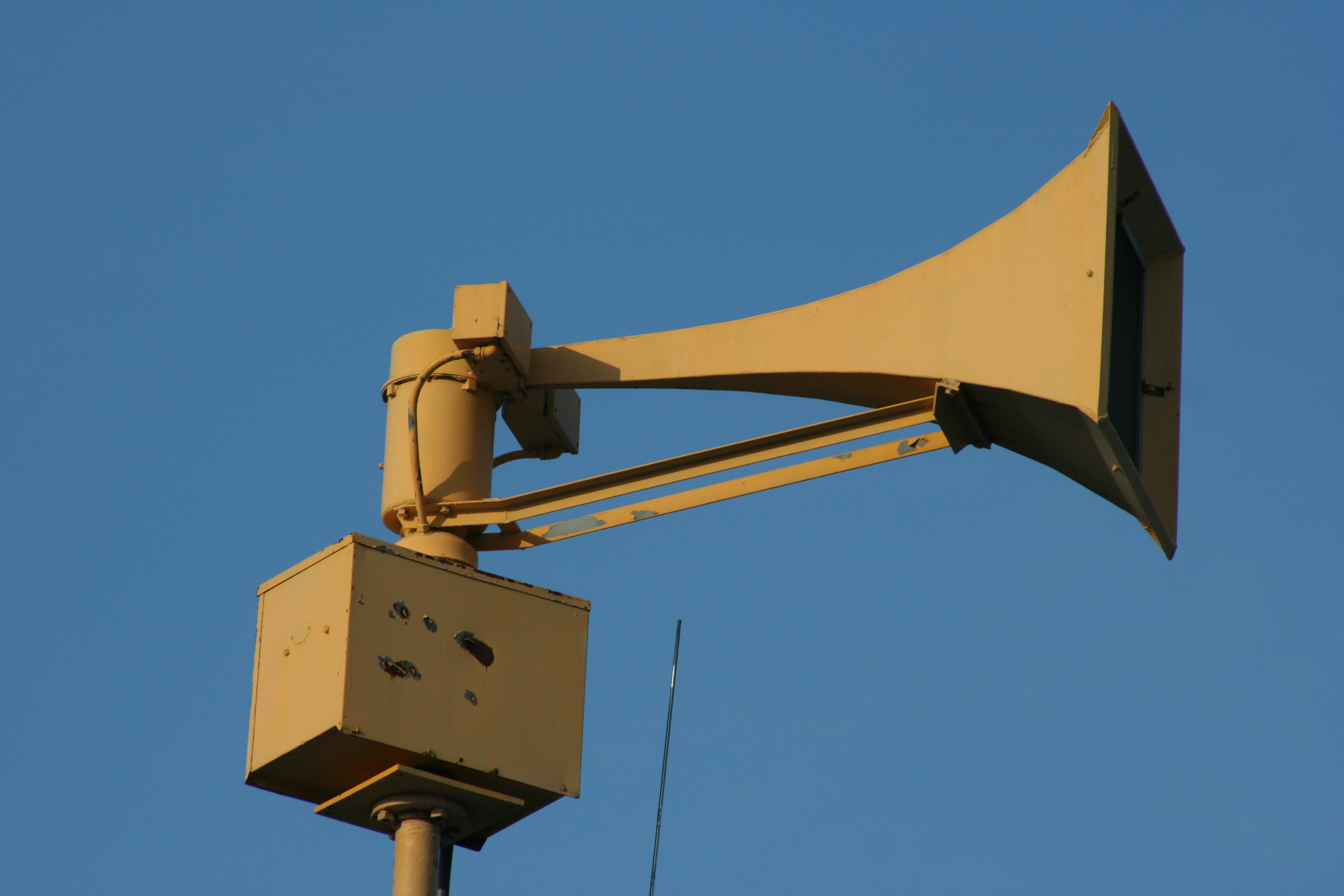
A Federal Signal Thunderbolt 1003 siren that was formerly in the Louisville, Kentucky, metro area, long since replaced (photo from 2009)

The Thunderbolt is an electro-mechanical outdoor warning siren that was manufactured by Federal Signal Corporation from 1952 until its production ended in 1990. It is a unidirectional, rotating siren with a large square-shaped horn, and can come in various colors, usually yellow, by request.

== History ==
The Thunderbolt siren was developed in the early 1950s. It was the first outdoor siren to be used with a blower to force air into the rotor. The blower increases the siren volume by 50 decibels. Many Thunderbolts are in private and legal (municipal) possession.

== Experimental mounting on locomotives ==
Around 1980, Federal Signal Corporation modified two Thunderbolt 1003 units for use as train horns, as part of a six-locomotive experiment.

The Union Pacific Railroad ultimately decided, apparently, that the standard locomotive horns were loud enough, and had all the experimental sirens removed. The modified 1003 sirens no longer exist, having presumably been scrapped by 1984.
