= Siren (alarm) =

Noise-making device

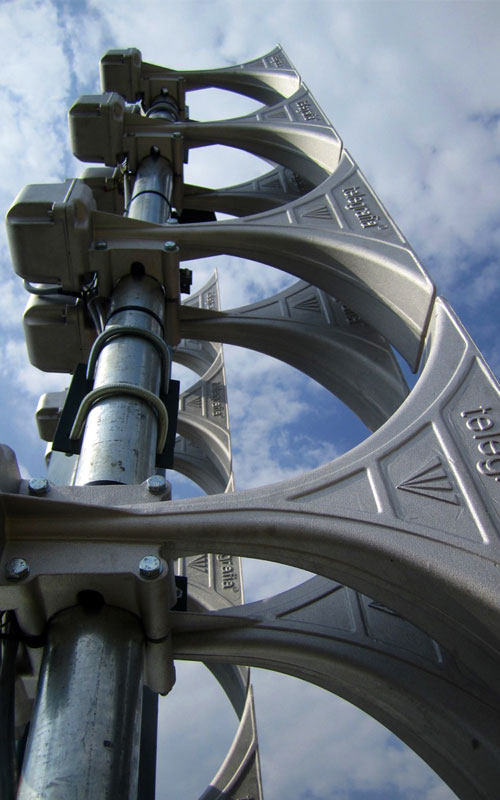
A Telegrafia Pavian.

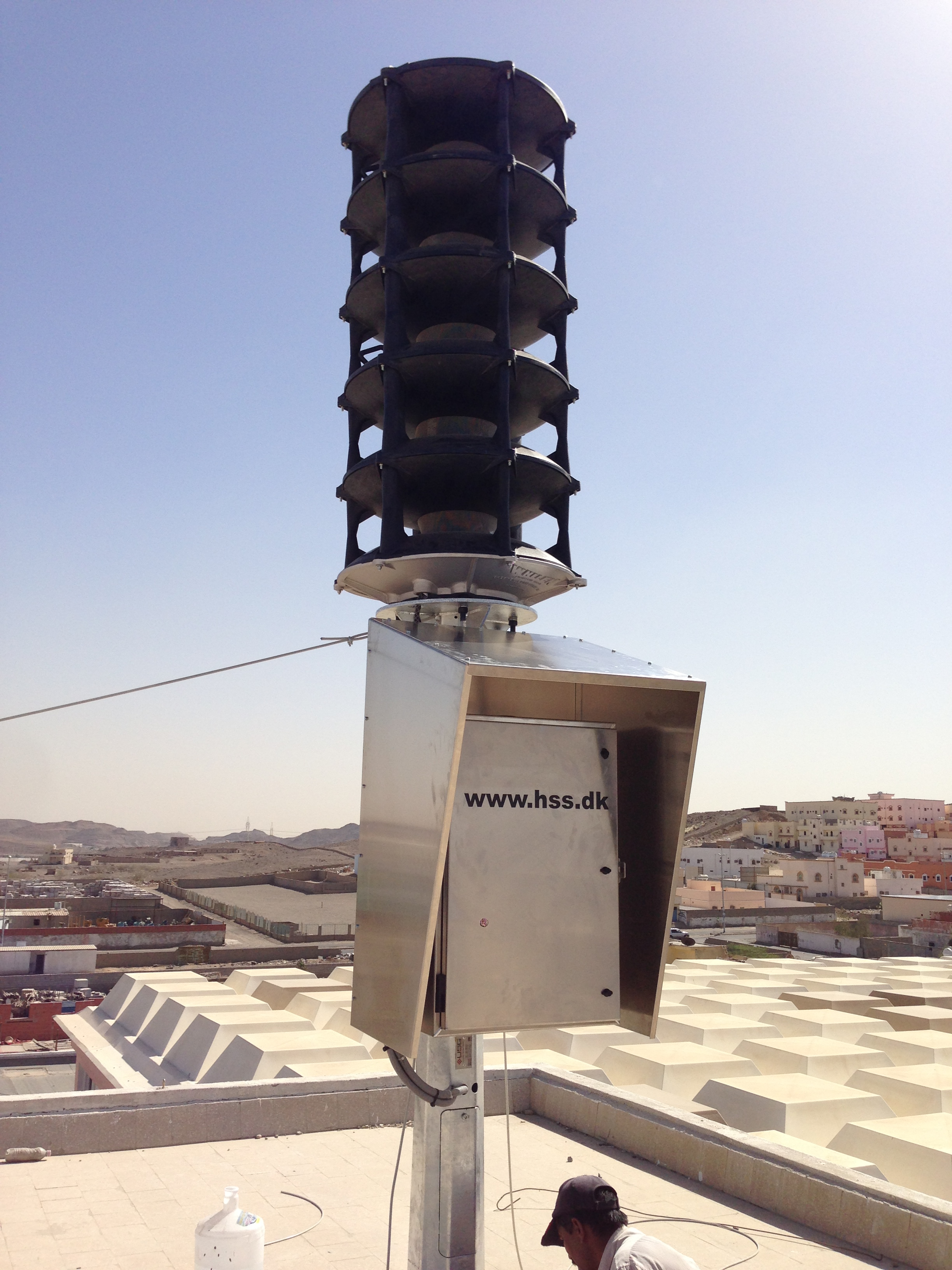
A Whelen WPS-2805 electronic siren imported to Saudi Arabia by HSS Engineering for use as a civil defense siren.

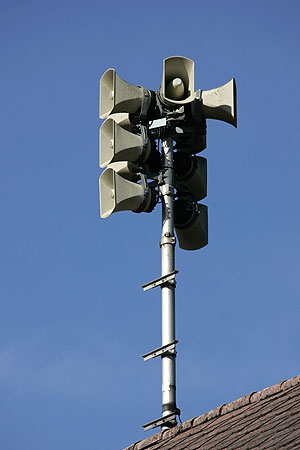
There are 8,200 alarm sirens for civil protection throughout Switzerland. They are tested once a year, on the first Wednesday of February. Sound sample

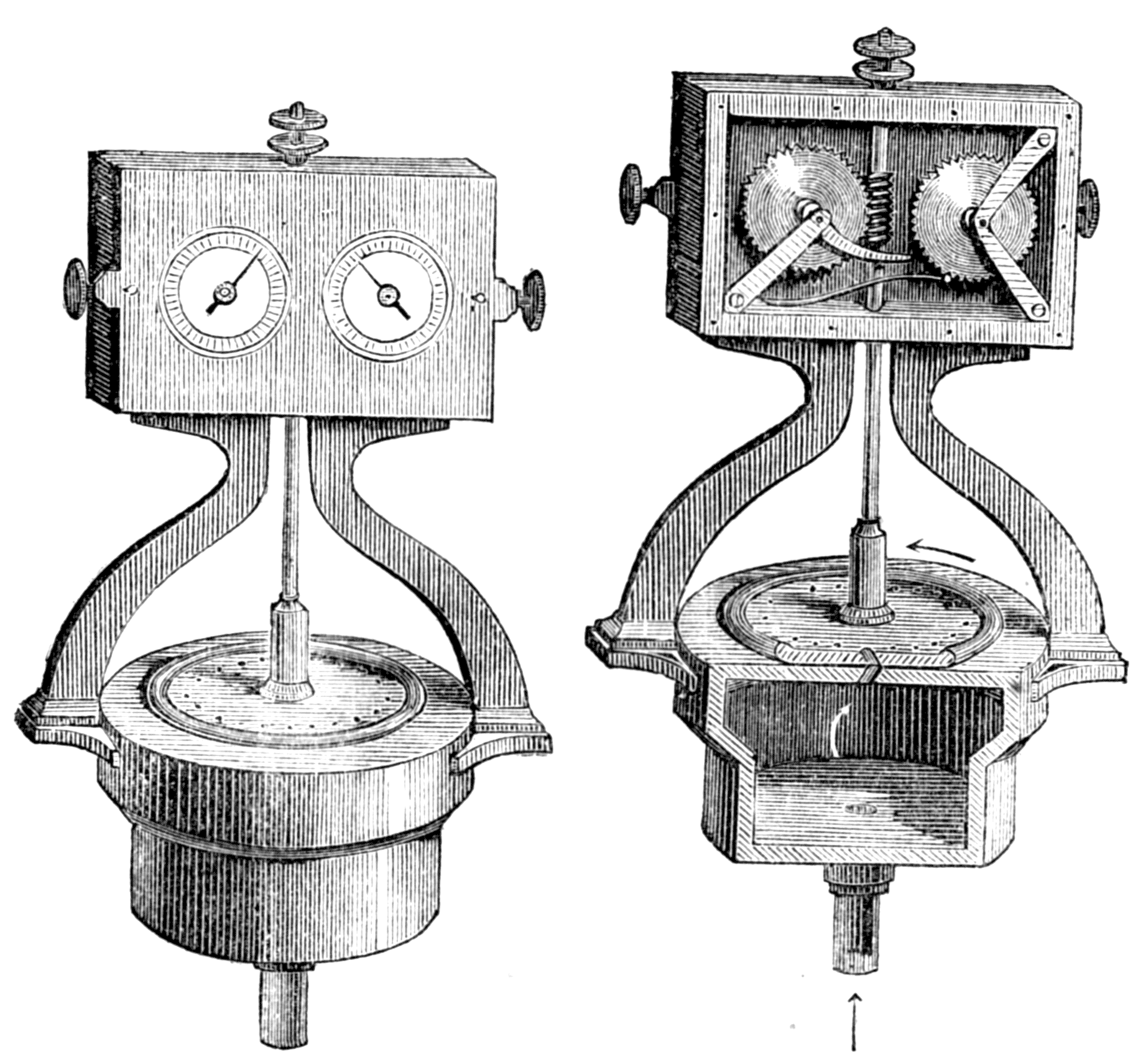
The world's first siren, from the 1860s.

A siren is a noise-making warning device. There are two general types: mechanical sirens and electronic sirens. Civil defense sirens are mounted in fixed locations and used to warn of natural disasters or attacks. Sirens are used on emergency service vehicles such as ambulances, police cars, and fire engines.

Many fire sirens (used for summoning volunteer firefighters) serve double duty as tornado or civil defense sirens, alerting an entire community of impending danger. Most fire sirens are either mounted on the roof of a fire station or on a pole next to the fire station. Fire sirens can also be mounted on or near government buildings, on tall structures such as water towers, as well as in systems where several sirens are distributed around a town for better sound coverage. Most fire sirens are single tone and mechanically driven by electric motors with a rotor attached to the shaft. Some newer sirens are electronically driven speakers.

Fire sirens are often called fire whistles, fire alarms, or fire horns. Although there is no standard signaling of fire sirens, some utilize codes to inform firefighters of the location of the fire. Civil defense sirens also used as fire sirens often can produce an alternating "hi-lo" signal (similar to emergency vehicles in many European countries or most railroad crossings in Indonesia) as the fire signal, or attack (slow wail), typically 3x, as to not confuse the public with the standard civil defense signals of alert (steady tone) and fast wail (fast wavering tone). Fire sirens are often tested once a day at noon and are also called noon sirens or noon whistles.

The first emergency vehicles relied on a bell. In the 1970s, they switched to a duotone airhorn, which was itself overtaken in the 1980s by an electronic wail.

== History ==
Some time before 1799, the siren was invented by the Scottish natural philosopher John Robison. Robison's sirens were used as musical instruments; specifically, they powered some of the pipes in an organ. Robison's siren consisted of a stopcock that opened and closed a pneumatic tube. The stopcock was apparently driven by the rotation of a wheel.

In 1819, an improved siren was developed and named by Baron Charles Cagniard de la Tour. De la Tour's siren consisted of two perforated disks that were mounted coaxially at the outlet of a pneumatic tube. One disk was stationary, while the other disk rotated. The rotating disk periodically interrupted the flow of air through the fixed disk, producing a tone. De la Tour's siren could produce sound under water, suggesting a link with the sirens of Greek mythology; hence the name he gave to the instrument.

Instead of disks, most modern mechanical sirens use two concentric cylinders, which have slots parallel to their length. The inner cylinder rotates while the outer one remains stationary. As air under pressure flows out of the slots of the inner cylinder and then escapes through the slots of the outer cylinder, the flow is periodically interrupted, creating a tone. The earliest such sirens were developed during 1877–1880 by James Douglass and George Slight (1859–1934) of Trinity House; the final version was first installed in 1887 at the Ailsa Craig lighthouse in Scotland's Firth of Clyde. When commercial electric power became available, sirens were no longer driven by external sources of compressed air, but by electric motors, which generated the necessary flow of air via a simple centrifugal fan, which was incorporated into the siren's inner cylinder.

To direct a siren's sound and to maximize its power output, a siren is often fitted with a horn, which transforms the high-pressure sound waves in the siren to lower-pressure sound waves in the open air.

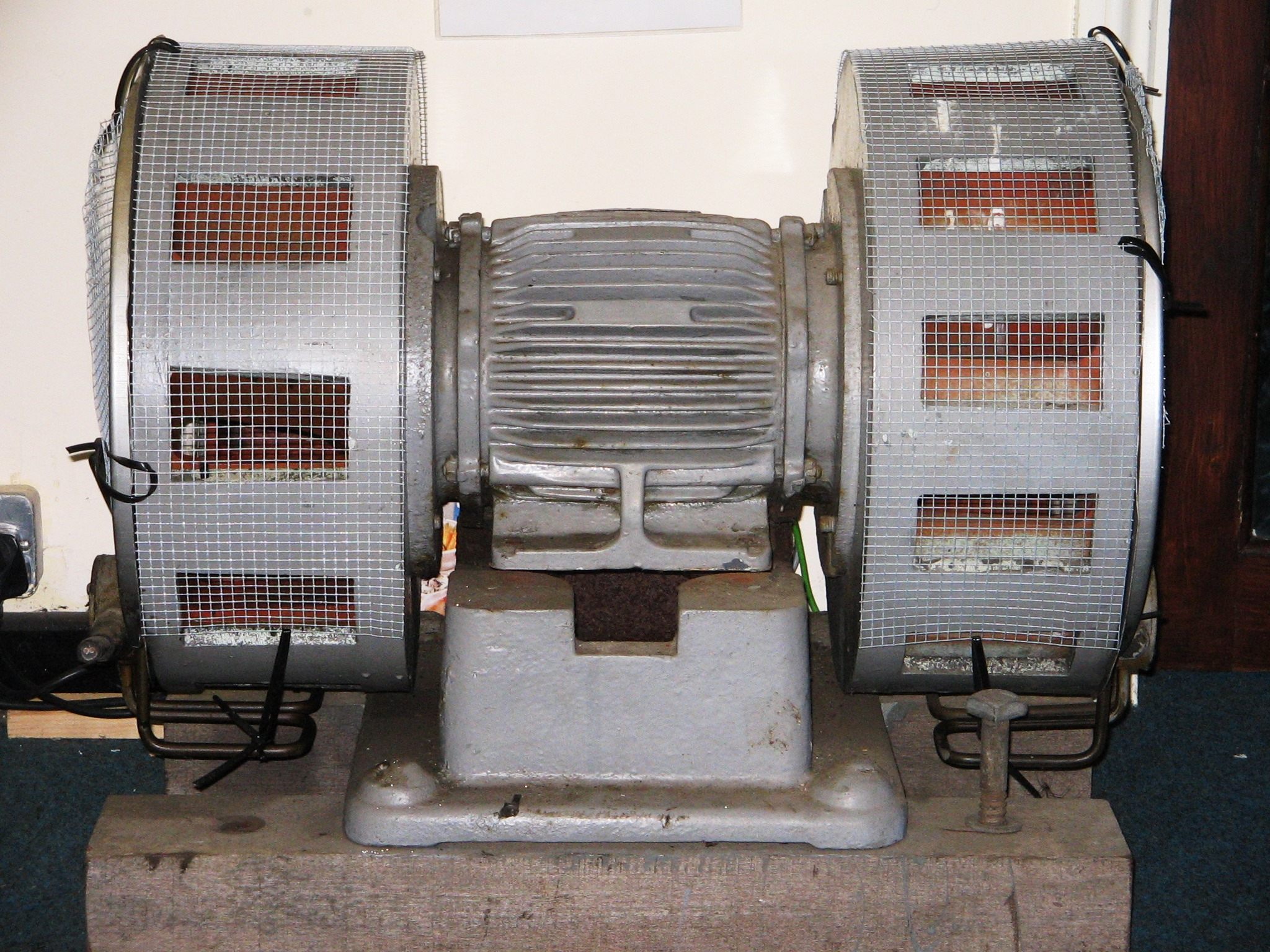
The air raid siren used to alert the town of Lowestoft during World War II.

The earliest way of summoning volunteer firemen to a fire was by ringing of a bell, either mounted atop the fire station, or in the belfry of a local church. As electricity became available, the first fire sirens were manufactured. In 1886 French electrical engineer Gustave Trouvé developed a siren to announce the silent arrival of his electric boats. Two early fire siren manufacturers were William A. Box Iron Works, who made the "Denver" sirens as early as 1905, and the Inter-State Machine Company (later the Sterling Siren Fire Alarm Company) who made the ubiquitous Model "M" electric siren, which was the first dual tone siren. The popularity of fire sirens took off by the 1920s, with many manufacturers including the Federal Electric Company and Decot Machine Works creating their own sirens. Since the 1970s, many communities have since deactivated their fire sirens as pagers became available for fire department use. Some sirens still remain as a backup to pager systems.

During the Second World War, the British civil defence used a network of sirens to alert the general population to the imminence of an air raid. A single tone denoted an "all clear". A series of tones denoted an air raid.

== Types ==
=== Pneumatic ===
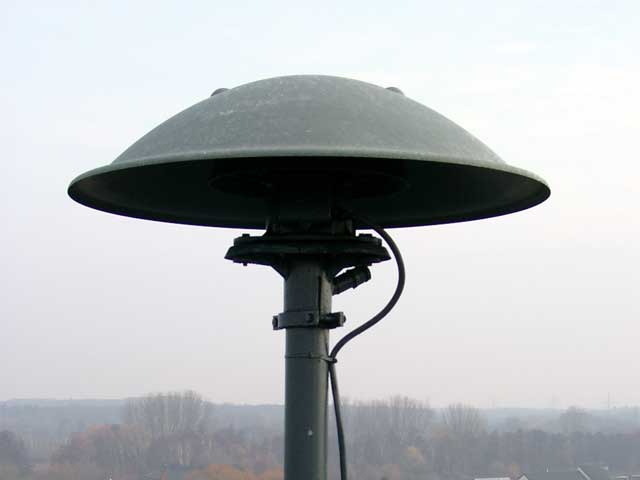
A motor siren (a German E57) Sound sample

The pneumatic siren, which is a free aerophone, consists of a rotating disk with holes in it (called a chopper, siren disk or rotor), such that the material between the holes interrupts a flow of air from fixed holes on the outside of the unit (called a stator). As the holes in the rotating disk alternately prevent and allow air to flow it results in alternating compressed and rarefied air pressure, i.e. sound. Such sirens can consume large amounts of energy. To reduce the energy consumption without losing sound volume, some designs of pneumatic sirens are boosted by forcing compressed air from a tank that can be refilled by a low powered compressor through the siren disk.

In United States English language usage, vehicular pneumatic sirens are sometimes referred to as mechanical or coaster sirens, to differentiate them from electronic devices. Mechanical sirens driven by an electric motor are often called "electromechanical". One example is the Q2B siren sold by Federal Signal Corporation. Because of its high current draw (100 amps when power is applied) its application is normally limited to fire apparatus, though it has seen increasing use on type IV ambulances and rescue-squad vehicles. Its distinct tone of urgency, high sound pressure level (123 dB at 10 feet) and square sound waves account for its effectiveness.

In Germany and some other European countries, the pneumatic two-tone (hi-lo) siren consists of two sets of air horns, one high pitched and the other low pitched. An air compressor blows the air into one set of horns, and then it automatically switches to the other set. As this back and forth switching occurs, the sound changes tones. Its sound power varies, but could get as high as approximately 125 dB, depending on the compressor and the horns. Comparing with the mechanical sirens, it uses much less electricity but needs more maintenance.

In a pneumatic siren, the stator is the part which cuts off and reopens air as rotating blades of a chopper move past the port holes of the stator, generating sound. The pitch of the siren's sound is a function of the speed of the rotor and the number of holes in the stator. A siren with only one row of ports is called a single tone siren. A siren with two rows of ports is known as a dual tone siren. By placing a second stator over the main stator and attaching a solenoid to it, one can repeatedly close and open all of the stator ports thus creating a tone called a pulse. If this is done while the siren is wailing (rather than sounding a steady tone) then it is called a pulse wail. By doing this separately over each row of ports on a dual tone siren, one can alternately sound each of the two tones back and forth, creating a tone known as Hi/Lo. If this is done while the siren is wailing, it is called a Hi/Lo wail. This equipment can also do pulse or pulse wail. The ports can be opened and closed to send Morse code. A siren which can do both pulse and Morse code is known as a code siren.

=== Electronic ===
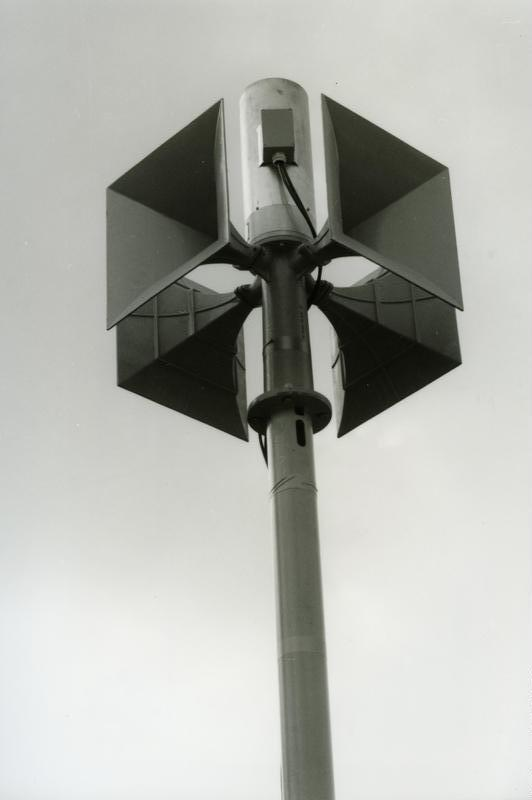
Hörmann HLS-381 Pneumatic siren

Electronic sirens incorporate circuits such as oscillators, modulators, and amplifiers to synthesize a selected siren tone (wail, yelp, pierce/priority/phaser, hi-lo, scan, airhorn, manual, and a few more) which is played through external speakers. It is not unusual, especially in the case of modern fire engines, to see an emergency vehicle equipped with both types of sirens. Often, police sirens also use the interval of a tritone to help draw attention. The first electronic siren that mimicked the sound of a mechanical siren was invented in 1965 by Motorola employees Ronald H. Chapman and Charles W. Stephens.

=== Other types ===
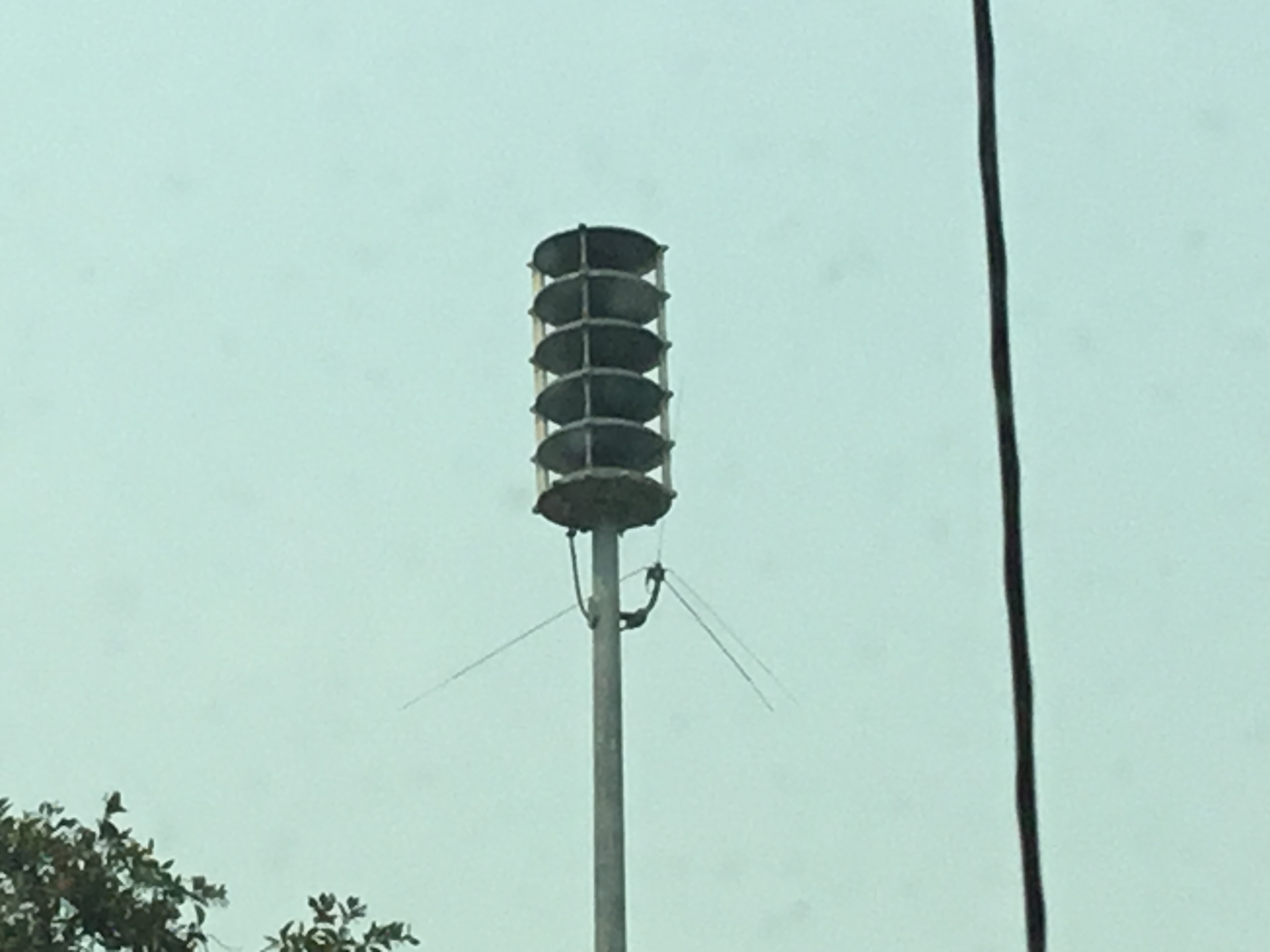
A Whelen WPS2750 in Milpitas, California.

Steam whistles were also used as a warning device if a supply of steam was present, such as a sawmill or factory. These were common before fire sirens became widely available, particularly in the former Soviet Union. Fire horns, large compressed air horns, also were and still are used as an alternative to a fire siren. Many fire horn systems were wired to fire pull boxes that were located around a town, and this would "blast out" a code in respect to that box's location. For example, pull box number 233, when pulled, would trigger the fire horn to sound two blasts, followed by a pause, followed by three blasts, followed by a pause, followed by three more blasts. In the days before telephones, this was the only way firefighters would know the location of a fire. The coded blasts were usually repeated several times. This technology was also applied to many steam whistles as well. Some fire sirens are fitted with brakes and dampers, enabling them to sound out codes as well. These units tended to be unreliable, and are now uncommon.

== Physics of the sound ==
Mechanical sirens blow air through a slotted disk or rotor. The cyclic waves of air pressure are the physical form of sound. In many sirens, a centrifugal blower and rotor are integrated into a single piece of material, spun by an electric motor.

Electronic sirens are high efficiency loudspeakers, with specialized amplifiers and tone generation. They usually imitate the sounds of mechanical sirens in order to be recognizable as sirens.

To improve the efficiency of the siren, it uses a relatively low frequency, usually several hundred hertz. Lower frequency sound waves go around corners and through holes better.

Sirens often use horns to aim the pressure waves. This uses the siren's energy more efficiently by aiming it. Exponential horns achieve similar efficiencies with less material.

The frequency, i.e. the cycles per second of the sound of a mechanical siren is controlled by the speed of its rotor, and the number of openings. The wailing of a mechanical siren occurs as the rotor speeds and slows. Wailing usually identifies an attack or urgent emergency.

The characteristic timbre or musical quality of a mechanical siren is caused because it is a triangle wave, when graphed as pressure over time. As the openings widen, the emitted pressure increases. As they close, it decreases. So, the characteristic frequency distribution of the sound has harmonics at odd (1, 3, 5...) multiples of the fundamental. The power of the harmonics roll off in an inverse square to their frequency. Distant sirens sound more "mellow" or "warmer" because their harsh high frequencies are absorbed by nearby objects.

Two tone sirens are often designed to emit a minor third, musically considered a "sad" sound. To do this, they have two rotors with different numbers of openings. The upper tone is produced by a rotor with a count of openings divisible by six. The lower tone's rotor has a count of openings divisible by five. Unlike an organ, a mechanical siren's minor third is almost always physical, not tempered. To achieve tempered ratios in a mechanical siren, the rotors must either be geared, run by different motors, or have very large numbers of openings. Electronic sirens can easily produce a tempered minor third.

A mechanical siren that can alternate between its tones uses solenoids to move rotary shutters that cut off the air supply to one rotor, then the other. This is often used to identify a fire warning.

When testing, a frightening sound is not desirable. So, electronic sirens then usually emit musical tones: Westminster chimes is common. Mechanical sirens sometimes self-test by "growling", i.e. operating at low speeds.

== In music ==
Sirens are also used as musical instruments. They have been prominently featured in works by avant-garde and contemporary classical composers. Examples include Edgard Varèse's compositions Amériques (1918–21, rev. 1927), Hyperprism (1924), and Ionisation (1931); Arseny Avraamov's Symphony of Factory Sirens (1922); George Antheil's Ballet Mécanique (1926); Dimitri Shostakovich's Symphony No. 2 (1927), and Henry Fillmore's "The Klaxon: March of the Automobiles" (1929), which features a klaxophone.

In popular music, sirens have been used in The Chemical Brothers' "Song to the Siren" (1992) and in a CBS News 60 Minutes segment played by percussionist Evelyn Glennie. A variation of a siren, played on a keyboard, are the opening notes of the REO Speedwagon song "Ridin' the Storm Out". Some heavy metal bands also use air raid type siren intros at the beginning of their shows. The opening measure of Money City Maniacs 1998 by Canadian band Sloan uses multiple sirens overlapped.

== Vehicle-mounted ==
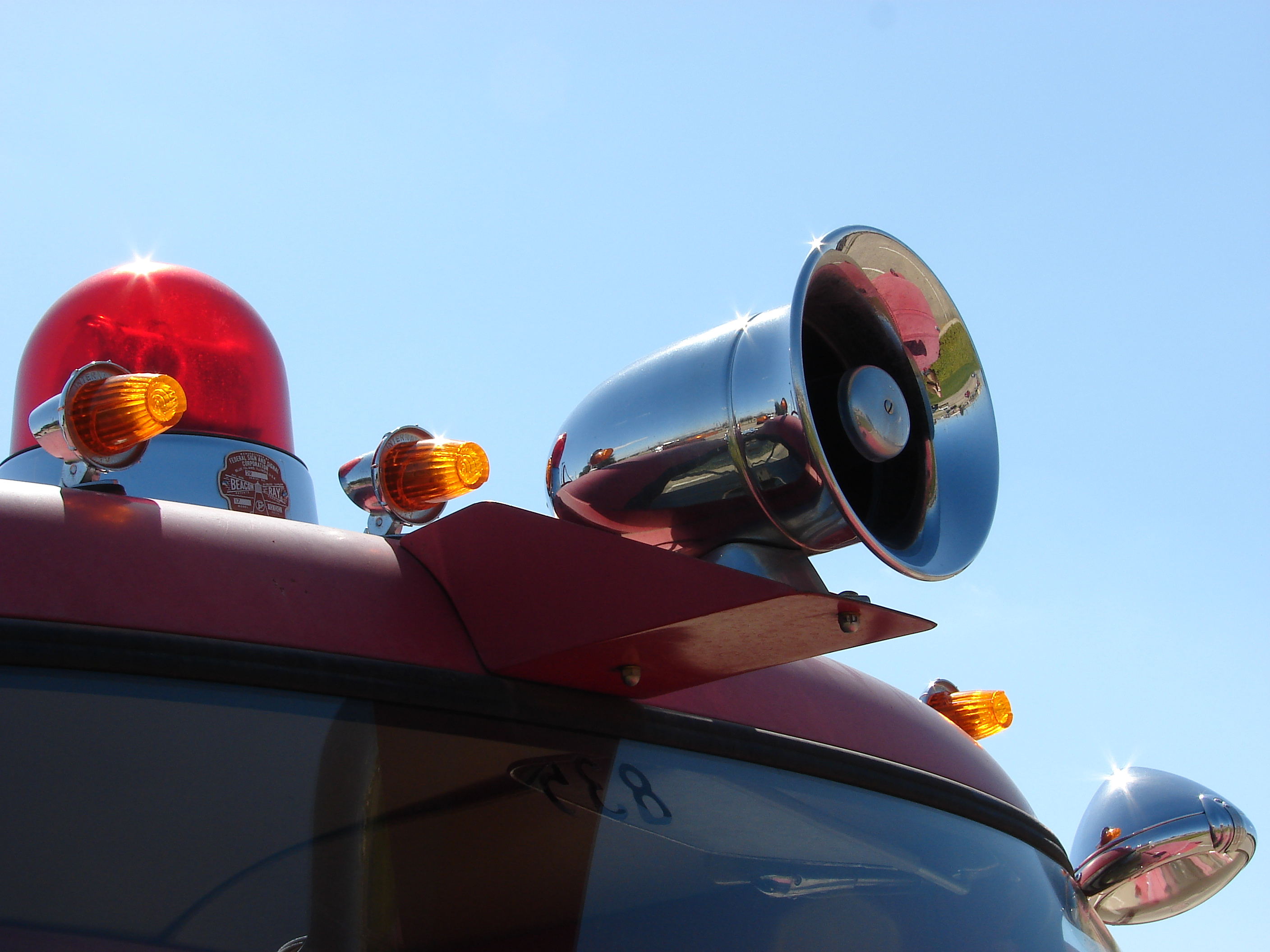
Warning siren and emergency lights mounted on a fire truck

=== Approvals or certifications ===
Governments may have standards for vehicle-mounted sirens. For example, in California, sirens are designated Class A or Class B. A Class A siren is loud enough that it can be mounted nearly anywhere on a vehicle. Class B sirens are not as loud and must be mounted on a plane parallel to the level roadway and parallel to the direction the vehicle travels when driving in a straight line.

Sirens must also be approved by local agencies, in some cases. For example, the California Highway Patrol approves specific models for use on emergency vehicles in the state. The approval is important because it ensures the devices perform adequately. Moreover, using unapproved devices could be a factor in determining fault if a collision occurs.

The SAE International Emergency Warning Lights and Devices committee oversees the SAE emergency vehicle lighting practices and the siren practice, J1849. (Note: Standard available at SAE J1849, 2020 Edition, February 2020 – Emergency Vehicle Sirens) This practice was updated through cooperation between the SAE and the National Institute of Standards and Technology. Though this version remains quite similar to the California Title 13 standard for sound output at various angles, this updated practice enables an acoustic laboratory to test a dual speaker siren system for compliant sound output.

=== Best practices ===
A fire truck uses a siren in Finland

Siren speakers, or mechanical sirens, should always be mounted ahead of the passenger compartment. This reduces the noise for occupants and makes two-way radio and mobile telephone audio more intelligible during siren use. It also puts the sound where it will be useful. A 2007 study found passenger compartment sound levels could exceed 90dB(A).

Research has shown that sirens mounted behind the engine grille or under the wheel arches produces less unwanted noise inside the passenger cabin and to the side and rear of the vehicle while maintaining noise levels to give adequate warnings. The inclusion of broadband sound to sirens has the ability to increase localisation of sirens, as in a directional siren, as a spread of frequencies makes use of the three ways the brain detects a direction of a sound: Interaural level difference, interaural time difference and head-related transfer function.

The worst installations are those where the siren sound is emitted above and slightly behind the vehicle occupants such as cases where a light-bar mounted speaker is used on a sedan or pickup. Vehicles with concealed sirens also tend to have high noise levels inside. In some cases, concealed or poor installations produce noise levels which can permanently damage vehicle occupants' hearing.

Electric-motor-driven mechanical sirens may draw 50 to 200 amperes at 12 volts (DC) when spinning up to operating speed. Appropriate wiring and transient protection for engine control computers is a necessary part of an installation. Wiring should be similar in size to the wiring to the vehicle engine starter motor. Mechanical vehicle mounted devices usually have an electric brake, a solenoid that presses a friction pad against the siren rotor. When an emergency vehicle arrives on-scene or is cancelled en route, the operator can rapidly stop the siren.

Multi-speaker electronic sirens often are alleged to have dead spots at certain angles to the vehicle's direction of travel. These are caused by phase differences. The sound coming from the speaker array can phase cancel in some situations. This phase cancellation occurs at single frequencies, based upon the spacing of the speakers. These phase differences also account for increases, based upon the frequency and the speaker spacing. However, sirens are designed to sweep the frequency of their sound output, typically, no less than one octave. This sweeping minimizes the effects of phase cancellation. The result is that the average sound output from a dual speaker siren system is 3 dB greater than a single speaker system.

== See also ==
- Blues and twos
- Chrysler air raid siren
- Civil defense siren
- Foghorn
- Klaxon
- Federal Signal Thunderbolt
- Warning system
- Q2B
