= Federal Signal Corporation =

American manufacturer headquartered in Downers Grove, Illinois

- Type: Public
- Traded as: NYSE: FSS; S&P 600 component
- Industry: Public safety
- Founded: 1901; 125 years ago
- Headquarters: Downers Grove, Illinois, United States
- Key people: Jennifer Sherman, President & CEO
- Products: Emergency vehicle equipment, warning sirens and public safety systems
- Revenue: ▲$1 billion+ USD (reference: 2018 10K)
- Number of employees: ~3,300
- Website: https://www.federalsignal.com

Federal Signal Corporation is an American manufacturer headquartered in Downers Grove, Illinois. Federal Signal manufactures street sweeper vehicles, public address systems, emergency vehicle equipment, and emergency vehicle lighting.

The company operates two groups: Federal Signal Environmental Solutions and Federal Signal Safety and Security Systems. Federal Signal Environmental Solutions Group manufactures street sweeper vehicles, sewer cleaner and vacuum loader trucks, hydro excavators, waterblasting equipment, dump truck bodies, and trailers. Federal Signal Safety and Security Systems Group manufactures campus alerting systems, emergency vehicle lighting, alarm systems, outdoor warning sirens, and public address systems.

Currently, the company has 13 manufacturing facilities in 5 different countries.

== History ==
=== Federal Electric ===
Federal Signal was founded in Chicago, Illinois, as the Federal Electric Company in 1901 by brothers John and James Gilchrist and partner John Goehst, manufacturing and selling store signs lit by incandescent lamps. By 1915, they began manufacturing and selling electrically operated mechanical sirens (such as the Q Siren and the Model 66 Siren). During this time, Federal Electric came under the ownership of Commonwealth Edison, eventually becoming a part of the utility empire of Samuel Insull.

By the 1950s, the company was manufacturing outdoor warning sirens, most notably the Thunderbolt series, primarily intended for warning of air raid attacks or fallout during the Cold War. Many of these sirens have been removed, but some still are operating in tornado siren systems. Longtime engineer Earl Gosswiller patented the Beacon-Ray and TwinSonic products, which were popular emergency vehicle lightbars.

=== Federal Sign & Signal ===
In 1955, the company became a corporation, renaming itself "Federal Sign and Signal Corporation". By this time, it made outdoor warning sirens, police sirens, fire alarms, and outdoor lighting.

By 1961, Federal Sign and Signal had gone public, trading on the NASDAQ market. This was when new products started being manufactured and sold, such as the Federal Signal STH-10. In 1962, the company merged with Electrical Products Corporation, a sign manufacturer based in Los Angeles.

=== Federal Signal ===
In 1976, the company became Federal Signal Corporation.

On Feb 22, 2000, Federal Signal Corporation announced the signing of a definitive agreement for the acquisition of P.C.S. Company.

On June 27, 2005, Federal Signal Corporation announced the signing of a joint venture agreement to establish a Chinese company, Federal Signal (Shanghai) Environmental & Sanitary Vehicle Company Limited, based near Shanghai, China.

On February 29, 2016, Federal Signal announced the signing of a definitive agreement for the acquisition of Canada's largest infrastructure-maintenance equipment supplier Joe Johnson Equipment (1), and the rights to the name and company.

On May 8, 2017, Federal Signal announced the acquisition of Truck Bodies and Equipment International (TBEI), making it the owner of six dump body and trailer brands, including Crysteel, Duraclass, Rugby Manufacturing, Ox Bodies, Travis and J-Craft.

On July 2, 2019, Federal Signal completed the acquisition of the assets and operations of Mark Rite Lines Equipment Company, Inc., a manufacturer of road-marking equipment. along with HighMark Traffic Services, Inc., which provides road-marking services in Montana. The signing of the purchase agreement was previously announced on May 14, 2019.

On November 17, 2022, Federal Signal announced the signing of a definitive agreement to acquire substantially all the assets and operations of Blasters, Inc. (“Blasters”), a leading manufacturer of truck-mounted waterblasting equipment, for an initial purchase price of $14 million, subject to post-closing adjustments. In addition, there is a contingent earn-out payment of up to $8 million.

On February 12, 2025, Federal Signal announced the acquisition of Waterblasting, LLC, owner of Hog Technologies ("Hog"), a leading U.S. manufacturer of truck-mounted road-marking, line-removal, and waterblasting equipment for an initial purchase price of $78.1 million. The initial purchase price, which was funded through existing cash on hand and borrowings under the Company's revolving credit facility, was subject to certain customary adjustments for working capital and debt-like items. In addition, there was a contingent earn-out opportunity included of up to $15 million, based on the achievement of specified financial targets during 2025. Additionally, Federal Signal entered into a definitive agreement to acquire Hog's primary manufacturing facility in Stuart, Florida for $14.5 million.

November 26, 2025 — Federal Signal Corporation announced that it has completed the acquisition of Scranton Manufacturing Company LLC d/b/a New Way Trucks (“New Way”), an industry-leading U.S.-based designer and manufacturer of refuse collection vehicles. The signing of the purchase agreement was previously announced on Sept. 24, 2025

January 16, 2026 — Federal Signal Corporation (NYSE: FSS) (the “Company”), a leader in environmental and safety solutions, announced that it has completed the acquisition of Mega Corp. (“Mega”), a leading manufacturer of specialty vehicles and equipment for use in global metal extraction and construction markets.

== Discontinued products ==
=== Federal Signal STH-10 ===
Federal Signal STH-10

The Federal Signal STH-10 is a discontinued omnidirectional siren produced by Federal Signal over a span of 50 years. It has twelve ports with a 10 horsepower AC Motor. Most examples are still around today.

=== Federal Signal Thunderbolt ===
The Federal Signal Thunderbolt is a discontinued series of rotating sirens produced by Federal Signal from 1952 to 1990, during the Cold War to warn of a nuclear attack. The three most common models made were the single-tone 1000, dual-tone 1000T, and the 1003 that came with a solenoid to make a hi-lo signal. Many towns in the United States still use Thunderbolts to warn the public in the event of severe weather, such as when a tornado warning is issued, but many Thunderbolts are now collecting rust in graveyards of companies assigned to install and remove civil defense sirens, where they can be purchased and refurbished by private collectors.

== See also ==
- Rumbler (siren)
- Q2B
- Federal Signal Model 2
- Federal Signal 3T22
- Federal Signal Modulator
- SiraTone
- Thunderbolt (siren)
