= Iowa Highway 9 =

State highway in Iowa, United States

Iowa Highway 9
- Iowa 9 highlighted in red

Route information
- Maintained by Iowa DOT
- Length: 295.088 mi (474.898 km)
- Existed: 1920–present

Major junctions
- West end: SD 42 near Larchwood
- US 75 in Rock Rapids; Iowa 60 near Sibley; US 59 near Allendorf; US 71 at Spirit Lake; US 169 at Lakota; US 69 at Forest City; I-35 near Hanlontown; US 63 near Saratoga; US 52 in Decorah
- East end: WIS 82 in Lansing

Location
- Country: United States
- State: Iowa
- Counties: Lyon; Osceola; Dickinson; Emmet; Kossuth; Winnebago; Worth; Mitchell; Howard; Winneshiek; Allamakee

Highway system
- Iowa Primary Highway System; Interstate; US; State; Secondary; Scenic
← Iowa 8	→ Iowa 10

Iowa Highway 9 is the most northern of Iowa's east–west highways, traversing the entire northern tier of counties. It runs from the eastern terminus of South Dakota Highway 42 at the South Dakota border east of Sioux Falls, South Dakota near Benclare, to the Wisconsin border at Lansing where it continues as Wisconsin Highway 82. It is largely rural in character, bypassing any large city. Making a few dips north and south, the highway largely follows a very straight east–west alignment.

== Route description ==
=== Northwest Iowa ===
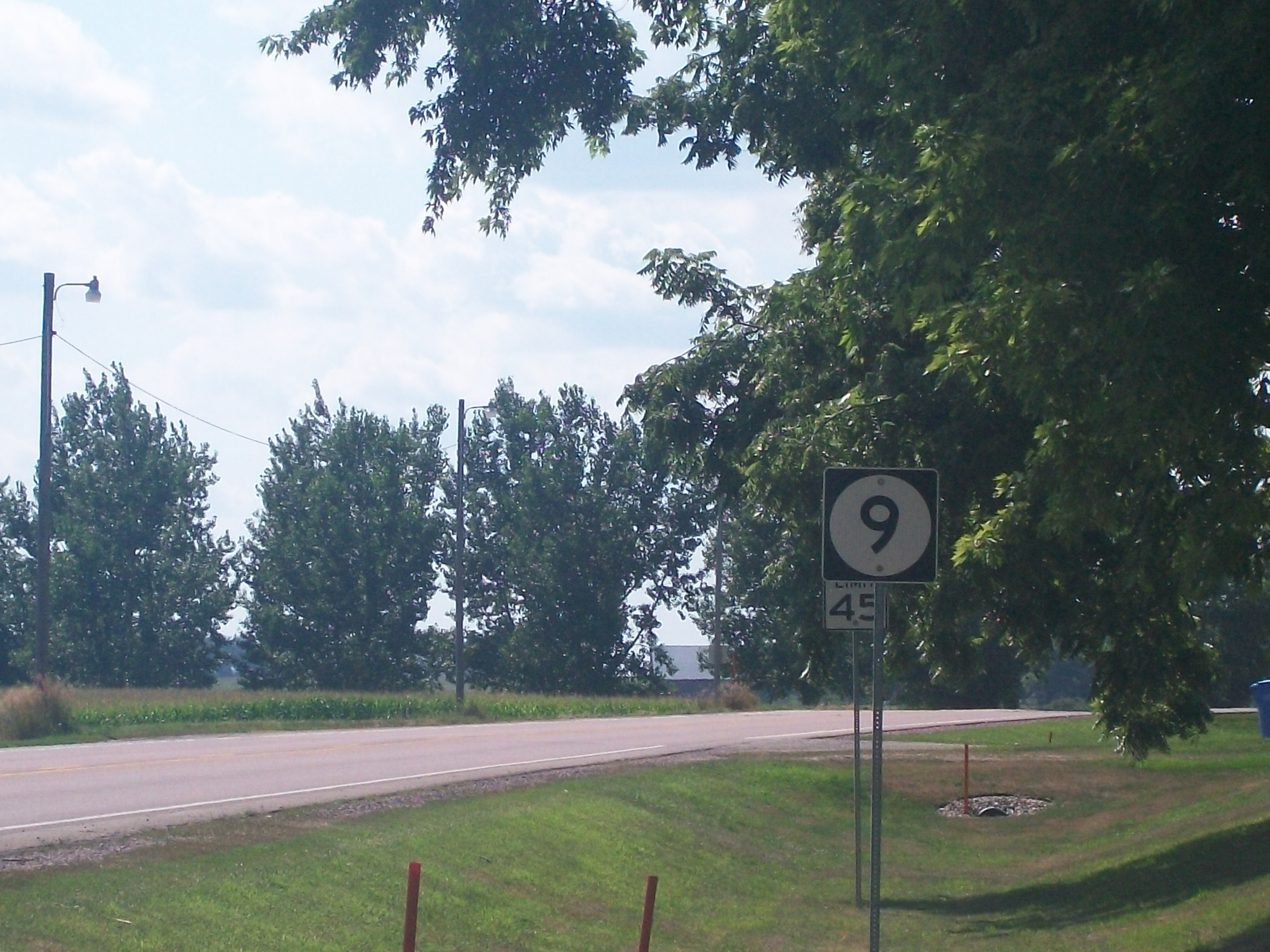
Iowa 9 looking west in Larchwood

Iowa 9 enters Iowa from South Dakota as a continuation of South Dakota Highway 42. At the same place the highway passes by Grand Falls Casino. The highway's entry point is four and a half miles (7.2 km) east of Iowa's northwestern corner. It heads south and east through Lyon County until it reaches Larchwood. There, it turns south for about a mile (1.5 km) where it meets the northern end of Iowa 182. From here, the highway runs due east for twelve miles (19 km). During this straight stretch, it passes just to the south of Lester. Just west of Rock Rapids, it meets U.S. Highway 75 (US 75). The two routes overlap one another for one mile (1.6 km) as the travel through northern Rock Rapids. US 75 splits away to the south and Iowa 9 heads into downtown Rock Rapids, where it crosses the Rock River.

East of Rock Rapids, the highway follows a section line that is four and a half miles (7.2 km) south of the Minnesota state line. Halfway between Rock Rapids and Little Rock, Iowa 9 intersects the northern and southern legs of County Road L14, which were previously Iowa 91 and Iowa 339, respectively. The highway passes Little Rock to the south and enters Osceola County. It continues east for seven and a half miles (12 km) until it reaches an interchange with Iowa 60 north of Sibley, that highway's final exit before entering Minnesota. Shortly thereafter, Iowa 9 meets US 59. The highway eases to the south as it follows the section line. It passes to the north of Ocheyedan and to the south of Rush Lake and Harris.

As Iowa 9 enters Dickinson County, it goes south of Silver Lake and Lake Park. It crosses the western and eastern branches of the Little Sioux River, which converge just south of the highway. The intersection with Iowa 86 marks Iowa 9's entry into the Iowa Great Lakes region. It becomes a four-lane divided highway for a short distance as it curves slightly to the south. In northwestern Spirit Lake, Iowa 9 is joined by US 71 from the south and they travel east through the downtown area. The highways turn sharply to the northeast in order to cross a narrow portion of East Okoboji Lake. They briefly follow the shore before turning back to the east and exiting Spirit Lake. Four miles (6.4 km) east of town, US 71 turns to the north and Iowa 9 continues towards Superior. Iowa 9 enters Emmet County and curves to the southeast as it approaches Estherville. There, it crosses the West Fork Des Moines River and Iowa 4. It continues due east for fifteen miles (24 km). Just west of Armstrong, it dips to the south and enters the southern part of town. It is overlapped by Iowa 15 for two blocks, a mere 600 feet (180 m).

=== North Central Iowa ===
In Kossuth County, Iowa 9 passes through Swea City. East of Swea City, it is joined by U.S. Route 169. It passes north of Lakota, where US 169 turns north. Travelling through Buffalo Center in Winnebago County, the route takes a short southerly dip to pass northeast of Thompson, continues east, and then south overlapping U.S. Route 69 to the northern edge of Forest City where it again turns east.

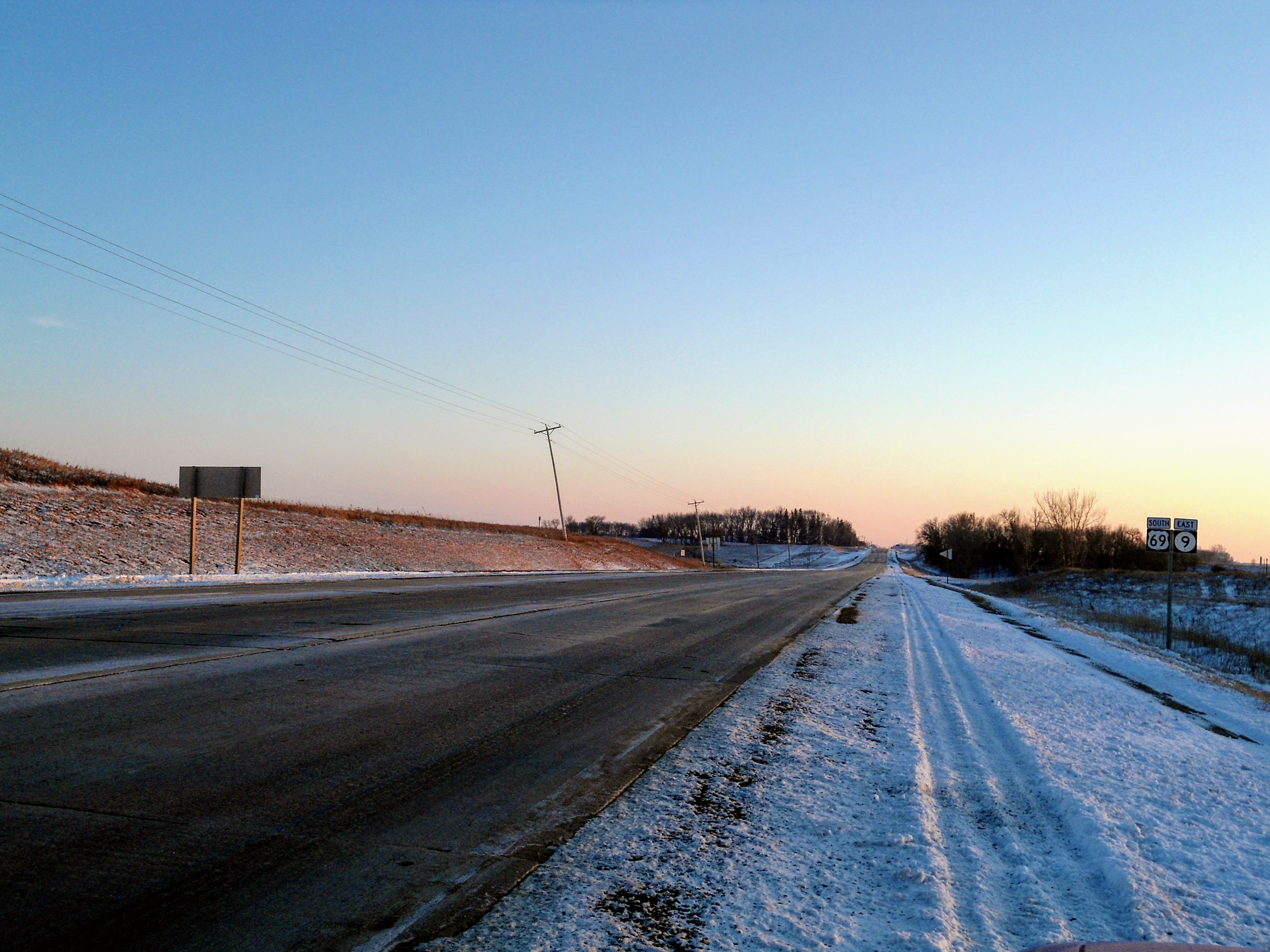
Iowa 9 follows US 69 for a few miles in Winnebago County

In Worth County, it travels past the northern edges of Fertile and Hanlontown, where it soon crosses Interstate 35. East of I-35, it passes through the south side of Manly.

In Mitchell County, it makes a straight run to and through Osage, where it begins a concurrence with U.S. Route 218. East of where US 218 turns south, Iowa 9 swings back north and resumes going east to Riceville, crossing the Wapsipinicon River in the process.

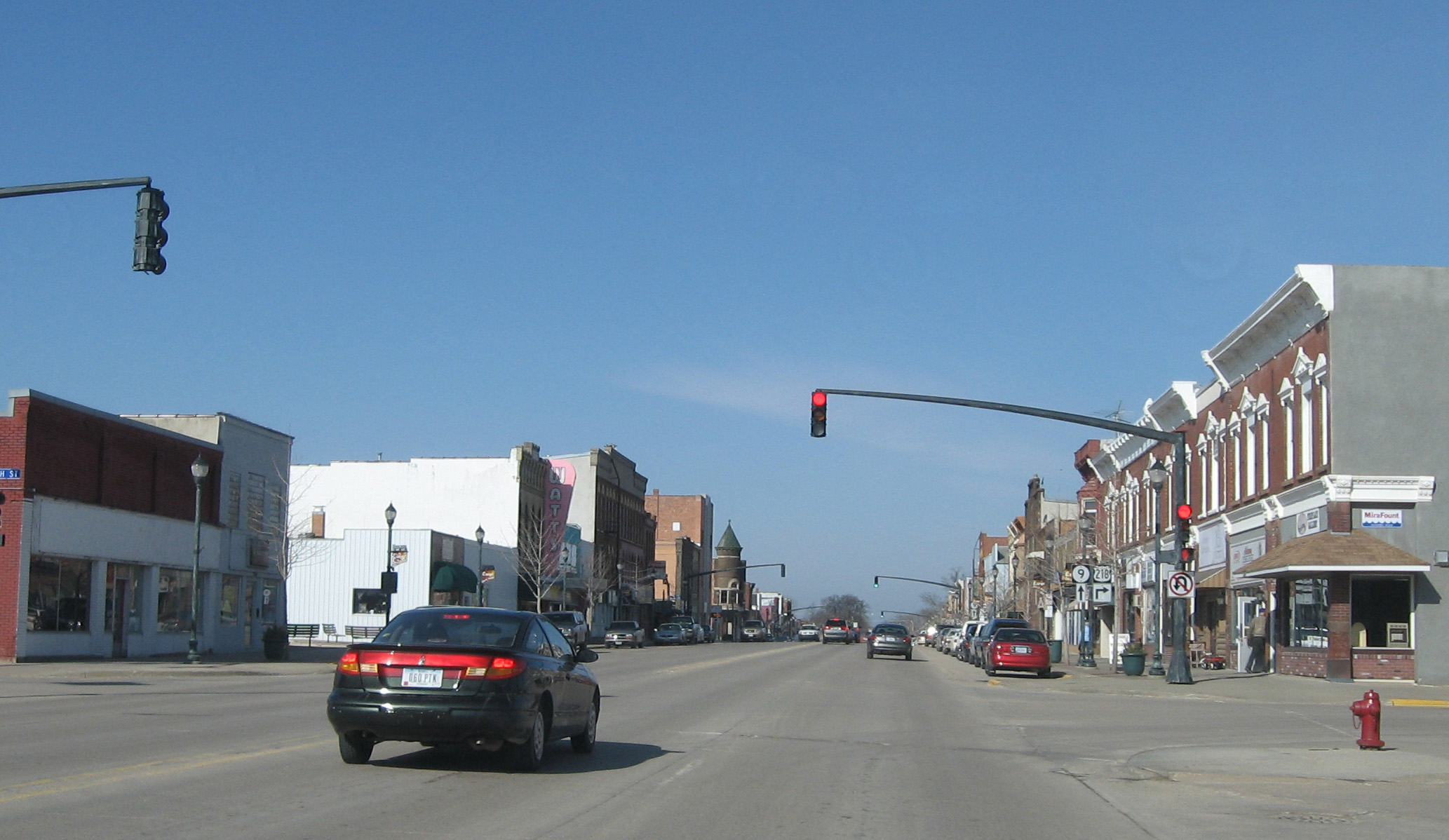
U.S. Highway 218 and Iowa Highway 9 briefly overlap through Osage.

=== Northeast Iowa ===
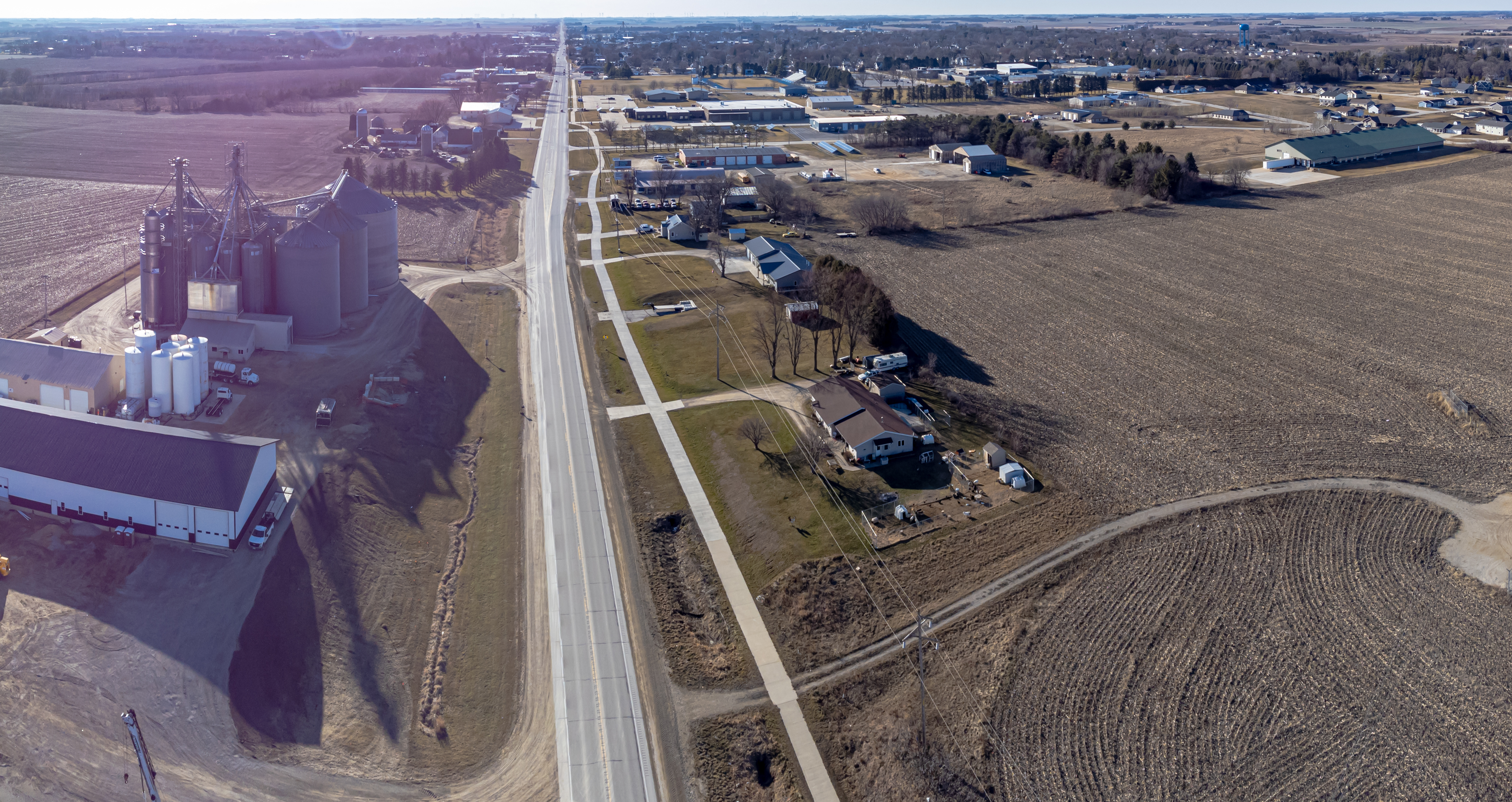
IA-9 through Cresco, Iowa

In Howard County, the highway makes a transition into the Driftless Area of Iowa, with progressively more rugged terrain evident as one travels east. West of Cresco, and south of Lime Springs, it crosses U.S. Route 63 before going through Cresco. In the process, it crosses two tributaries of the Turkey River.

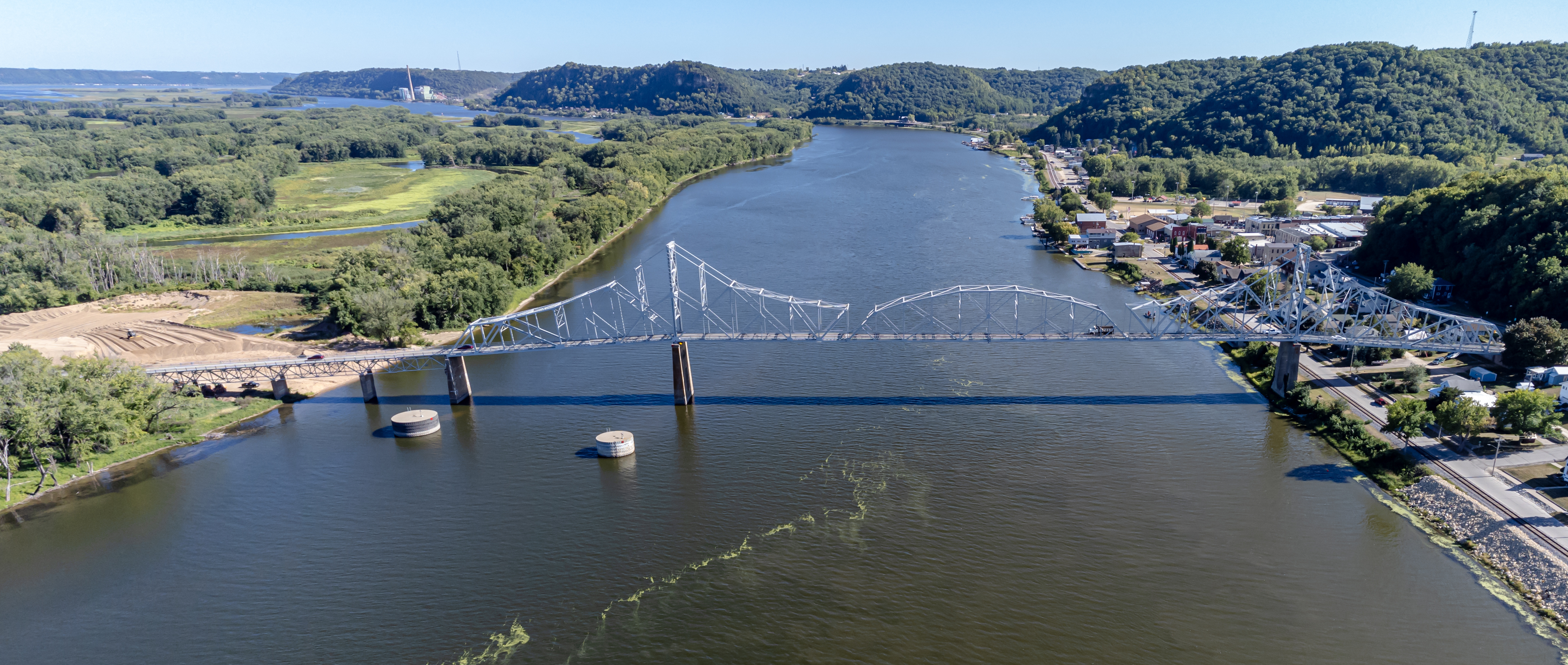
The Black Hawk Bridge marks the eastern end of Iowa 9, the southern end of Iowa 26, and the western end of WIS 82.

In Winneshiek County, it runs southeasterly, straightening out to go through Decorah in the valley of the Upper Iowa River. In Decorah, it crosses U.S. Route 52. It again takes a southeasterly drift. In Allamakee County, the highway becomes crooked. Just east of the county line, Iowa Highway 51 meets its northern terminus. Running south of Waukon, it then turns north through Waukon, briefly joined by Iowa Highway 76. In the northern part of Waukon, it curves north and east, into Lansing, through the valley of Clear Creek and downtown Lansing. Just before crossing the Mississippi River, it meets the southern terminus of Iowa Highway 26. It then turns onto the Black Hawk Bridge, where it joins Wisconsin Highway 82.

== Major intersections ==
County	Location	mi	km	Destinations	Notes
Lyon	Sioux Township	0.000	0.000	SD 42 west / CR A10 east – Sioux Falls, S.D.	Continuation into South Dakota; CR A10 follows the state line
Lyon	Larchwood–Logan township line	7.262	11.687	Iowa 182 south – Inwood	
Lyon	Riverside–Rock township line	19.029	30.624	US 75 north – Luverne, Minn.	Western end of US 75 overlap
Lyon	Rock Rapids	20.021	32.221	US 75 south (Union Street)	Eastern end of US 75 overlap
Lyon	Midland–Liberal township line	27.951	44.983	CR L14 – Ellsworth, Minn.	Former Iowa 91
Lyon	Midland–Liberal township line	28.951	46.592	CR L14 – George	Former Iowa 339
Lyon	Elgin–Grant township line	34.733	55.897	Maple Avenue	Former Iowa 189
Osceola	Wilson–East Holman township line	43.268	69.633	Iowa 60 – Le Mars, Worthington, Minn.	Interchange; Iowa 60 exit 53
Osceola	Wilson–East Holman township line	46.808	75.330	US 59 – Sanborn, Worthington, Minn.	
Osceola	Horton–Ocheyedan township line	52.280	84.137	CR L58 – Ocheyedan	Former Iowa 237
Osceola	Fairview–Allison township line	57.349	92.294	CR M20 – Harris	Former Iowa 238
Dickinson	Silver Lake–Excelsior township line	62.882	101.199	CR M27 – Lake Park	Former Iowa 219
Dickinson	Diamond Lake–Lakeville township line	70.090	112.799	Iowa 86 – Milford, Lakefield, Minn.	
Dickinson	Spirit Lake	72.978	117.447	US 71 south	Western end of US 71 overlap
Dickinson	Spirit Lake	74.186	119.391	Hill Avenue	Former Iowa 276
Dickinson	Superior–Richland township line	79.984	128.722	US 71 north – Jackson, Minn.	Eastern end of US 71 overlap
Dickinson	Superior–Richland township line	80.988	130.338	CR N14 – Terril	Former Iowa 203
Emmet	Estherville	88.639	142.651	Iowa 4 (9th Street) – Emmetsburg, Sherburn, Minn.	
Emmet	Armstrong	106.493	171.384	Iowa 15 south (4th Street) – Ringsted	Western end of Iowa 15 overlap
Emmet	Armstrong	106.608	171.569	Iowa 15 north (6th Street) – Fairmont, Minn.	Eastern end of Iowa 15 overlap
Kossuth	Harrison Township	119.989	193.104	US 169 south – Bancroft, Algona	Western end of US 169 overlap
Kossuth	Lakota	126.186	203.077	188th Avenue – Lakota	Former Iowa 250
Kossuth	Lakota	126.429	203.468	US 169 north – Blue Earth, Minn.	Eastern end of US 169 overlap
Winnebago	Buffalo Center	134.325	216.175	CR R20 – Rake	Former Iowa 254
Winnebago	Newton Township	149.811	241.097	US 69 north – Lake Mills	Western end of US 69 overlap
Winnebago	Forest City	156.837	252.405	US 69 south – Garner	Eastern end of US 69 overlap
Winnebago	Mount Valley Township	160.184	257.791	250th Avenue – Pilot Knob State Park	Former Iowa 332
Worth	Fertile Township	167.696	269.881	CR S18 – Fertile	Former Iowa 86
Worth	Danville Township	171.951	276.728	I-35 / Iowa 27 – Des Moines, Minneapolis	I-35 exit 203
Worth	Manly	178.962	288.011	US 65 (Orchid Avenue) – Northwood, Mason City	
Worth	Union Township	186.370	299.933	CR S62 – Grafton	Former Iowa 337
Mitchell	Osage	199.124	320.459	US 218 north (N. 7th Street) – St. Ansgar	Western end of US 218 overlap
Mitchell	Burr Oak Township	203.121	326.892	US 218 south – Floyd	Eastern end of US 218 overlap
Mitchell	Jenkins Township	215.087	346.149	CR T64 – McIntire	Former Iowa 312
Howard	Howard Center Township	230.040	370.213	US 63 – New Hampton, Rochester, Minn.	
Howard	Cresco	239.008	384.646	CR V58 – Protivin	Former Iowa 139 south
Howard–Winneshiek county line	Vernon Springs–Orleans township line	241.025	387.892	Iowa 139 north – Harmony, Minn.	
Winneshiek	Decorah	258.036	415.269	US 52 – Rochester, Minn.	
Winneshiek	Decorah	258.450	415.935	Short Street	Former US 52
Allamakee	Ludlow Township	271.609	437.112	Iowa 51 south – Postville	
Allamakee	Jefferson Township	276.278	444.626	Iowa 76 south – Marquette, Effigy Mounds National Monument	Western end of Iowa 76 overlap
Allamakee	Waukon	278.285	447.856	Iowa 76 north (Main Street) – Eitzen, Minn.	Eastern end of Iowa 76 overlap
Allamakee	Lansing	295.246	475.152	Iowa 26 / Great River Road north (2nd Street) / WIS 82 east – De Soto, Wis., New Albin	Signed end of Iowa 9
Mississippi River		295.472	475.516	Black Hawk Bridge; Iowa–Wisconsin state line	
Mississippi River		295.472	475.516	WIS 82 east – De Soto, Wis.	Continuation into Wisconsin
1.000 mi = 1.609 km; 1.000 km = 0.621 mi: Closed/former; Concurrency terminus
