= National Register of Historic Places listings in Lyon County, Iowa =

Location of Lyon County in Iowa

This is a list of the National Register of Historic Places listings in Lyon County, Iowa.

This is intended to be a complete list of the properties and districts on the National Register of Historic Places in Lyon County, Iowa, United States. Latitude and longitude coordinates are provided for many National Register properties and districts; these locations may be seen together in a map.

There are 10 properties and districts listed on the National Register in the county, including one National Historic Landmark.

This National Park Service list is complete through NPS recent listings posted November 21, 2025.

	Name on the Register	Image	Date listed	Location	City or town	Description
1	Big Sioux Prehistoric Prairie Procurement System Archaeological District		January 17, 1989 (#88001169)	Address Restricted	Klondike	
2	Blood Run Site	Blood Run Site	August 29, 1970 (#70000246)	On the Iowa/South Dakota border along the Big Sioux River; 43°30′01″N 96°35′49″W	Granite	
3	Broad View Ranch Historic District		September 23, 1994 (#94001137)	2572 Log Ave. 43°16′33″N 95°54′01″W	Sheldon	
4	Burlington, Cedar Rapids, and Northern Railroad-Rock Rapids Station, Railroad Track and Bridge	Burlington, Cedar Rapids, and Northern Railroad-Rock Rapids Station, Railroad Track and Bridge	November 7, 1976 (#76000783)	N. Story St. 43°26′01″N 96°09′59″W	Rock Rapids	
5	Duncan-Duitsman Farm Historic District		September 23, 1994 (#94001138)	4324 180th St. 43°23′33″N 95°56′04″W	George	
6	First Methodist Church	First Methodist Church	June 23, 1978 (#78001244)	302 S. Carroll St. 43°25′45″N 96°10′19″W	Rock Rapids	
7	Klondike Bridge	Klondike Bridge	May 15, 1998 (#98000510)	180th St. over the Big Sioux River; 43°23′16″N 96°31′18″W	Larchwood	
8	Lyon County Courthouse	Lyon County Courthouse	October 1, 1979 (#79000913)	3rd and Story Sts. 43°25′48″N 96°10′02″W	Rock Rapids	
9	Melan Bridge	Melan Bridge	October 18, 1974 (#74000797)	East of Rock Rapids in Emma Sater Park; 43°25′49″N 96°09′19″W	Rock Rapids	
10	Charles B. Reynolds Round Barn		July 7, 1999 (#99000737)	2382 Harrison Ave. 43°18′10″N 96°09′21″W	Doon	Demolished

== Former listings ==
	Name on the Register	Image	Date listed	Date removed	Location	City or town	Description
1	Kruger Mill		November 3, 1975 (#75000696)	December 15, 2003	SW of Larchwood on Sioux River	Larchwood vicinity	

== See also ==
- List of National Historic Landmarks in Iowa
- National Register of Historic Places listings in Iowa
- Listings in neighboring counties: Lincoln (SD), Minnehaha (SD), Nobles (MN), Osceola, Rock (MN), Sioux
