= Iowa Highway 182 =

State highway in Iowa

Iowa Highway 182
- Iowa 182 highlighted in red

Route information
- Maintained by Iowa DOT
- Length: 9.051 mi (14.566 km)
- Existed: January 1, 1969–present
- History: 1930–1968: known as Iowa 26

Major junctions
- South end: US 18 / CR A42 at Inwood
- North end: Iowa 9 near Larchwood

Location
- Country: United States
- State: Iowa
- Counties: Lyon

Highway system
- Iowa Primary Highway System; Interstate; US; State; Secondary; Scenic
← Iowa 175	→ Iowa 183

Iowa Highway 182 (Iowa 182) is a 9-mile-long (14 km) state highway in the northwestern corner of Iowa. It begins at U.S. Highway 18 (US 18) in Inwood and ends at Iowa 9 southeast of Larchwood. The highway has been in the primary highway system since 1930, when it was known as Iowa 26. On January 1, 1969, Iowa 26 and Iowa 182 swapped designations.

== Route description ==
Iowa Highway 182 begins at an intersection with US 18 and County Road A42 (CR A42). At the intersection, eastbound US 18 approaches from the west, eastbound US 18 approaches from the south, and CR A42 approaches from the east. Iowa 182 travels north through Inwood for one mile (1.6 km) and continues due north through the farmland of Lyon County for eight miles (13 km) to an intersection with Iowa Highway 9. The intersection with Iowa 9 is very similar to the intersection with US 18; eastbound Iowa 9 approaches from the north and westbound Iowa 9 approaches from the east.

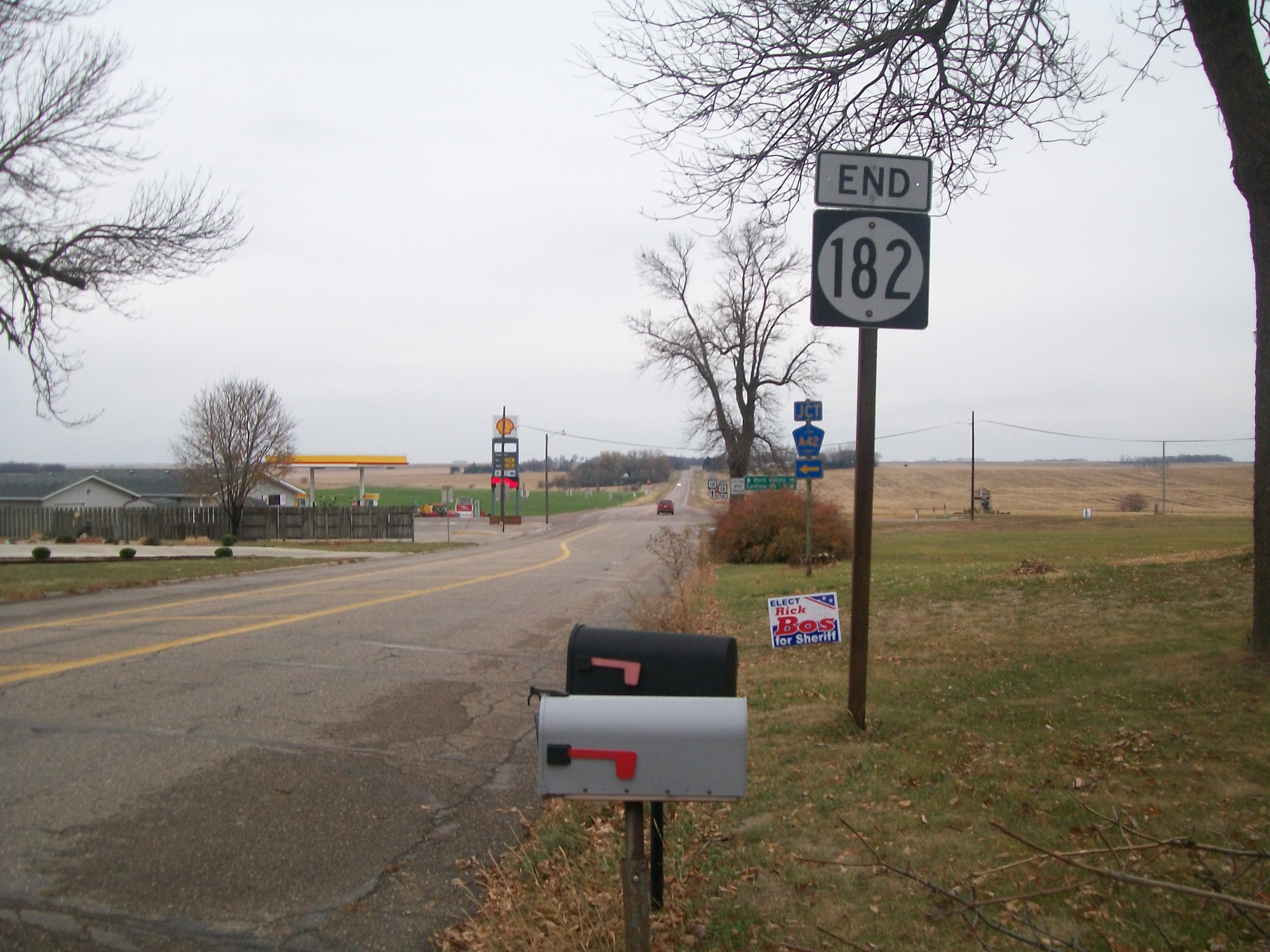
Iowa 182 ends in Inwood

== History ==
Between 1930 and 1968, the highway now known as Iowa 182 was called Iowa 26. This was the second instance of Iowa 26. The first was designated in 1920 with the rest of the primary highway system. It was originally a spur route from Primary Road No. 19 (now US 18) to Rock Valley. Iowa 26 was extended north from Rock Valley back to US 18 in 1929.

In 1930, US 18 was rerouted in Lyon and Sioux counties. The new routing of US 18 went through Rock Valley, thus eliminating the need for Iowa 26, which had connected Rock Valley to US 18. The Iowa 26 designation was moved northwest. It replaced County Road S, which followed the same course Iowa 182 now follows.

On January 1, 1969, the Iowa State Highway Commission, now known as the Iowa Department of Transportation, renumbered several state highways. The changes to the highway system fixed a number of issues: creating continuous route numbers across state lines, removing duplicate route numbers where they were unnecessary, and extending route numbers in some locations. In this case, the former Iowa 182 in Allamakee County crossed into Minnesota and became Trunk Highway 26. The two routes' numbers were switched and have remained the same since then.

== Major intersections ==
The entire route is in Lyon County.

Location	mi	km	Destinations	Notes
Inwood	0.000	0.000	US 18 / CR A42	
Logan Township	9.051	14.566	Iowa 9	
1.000 mi = 1.609 km; 1.000 km = 0.621 mi
