= Iowa Highway 26 =

State highway in Iowa, United States

Iowa Highway 26
- Iowa 26 highlighted in red

Route information
- Maintained by Iowa DOT
- Length: 11.370 mi (18.298 km)
- Existed: 1969–present
- Tourist routes: Great River Road; Driftless Area Scenic Byway

Major junctions
- South end: Iowa 9 / WIS 82 at Lansing
- North end: MN 26 at New Albin

Location
- Country: United States
- State: Iowa
- Counties: Allamakee

Highway system
- Iowa Primary Highway System; Interstate; US; State; Secondary; Scenic
← Iowa 25	→ Iowa 27

Iowa Highway 26 (Iowa 26) is a 11-mile-long (18 km) state highway that runs from south to north in Allamakee County, Iowa. It begins in Lansing at an intersection with Iowa Highway 9 at the Black Hawk Bridge and ends at the Minnesota border at New Albin. It continues into Minnesota as Minnesota State Highway 26 (TH 26). Iowa 26 was created in 1969 in a numbering swap with Iowa Highway 182. The designation was changed to match TH 26. The highway is the northernmost leg of the Great River Road in Iowa. Most of the highway is designated the Driftless Area Scenic Byway.

== Route description ==
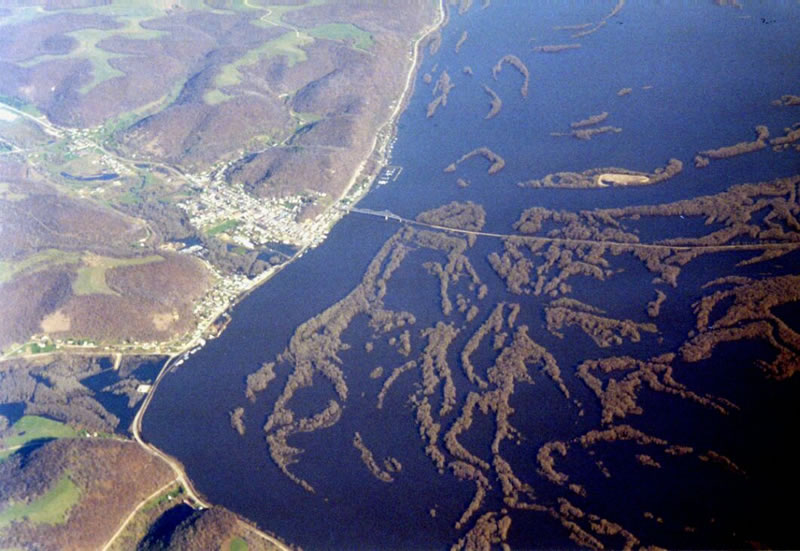
Aerial view of Lansing and the Mississippi River. Iowa 26 (top) can be seen here heading north along the western bank of the river.

Iowa 26 begins at a T-intersection with Iowa 9 at the foot of the Black Hawk Bridge in Lansing. As a part of the Drifless Area Scenic Byway and Great River Road, it heads north nestled between the bluffs that tower 300 feet (91 m) over the city and homes that line the Mississippi riverfront. After exiting Lansing, the highway draws closer to the river and to the Dakota, Minnesota & Eastern Railroad.

The highway is dotted with houses as it continues north between the river and the bluffs. The bluffs were created during the last ice age when this region of the midwest was untouched by glaciers. The region is thus called the Driftless Area, referring to the lack of glacial drift, the material left behind by retreating continental glaciers.

One and a half miles (2.4 km) south of New Albin, Iowa 26 crosses the Upper Iowa River and then intersects County Road A26, which takes the Driftless Area Scenic Byway west to Iowa 76. Through New Albin, it travels along Railroad Street, referring to the adjacent railroad. Heading northeast, it leaves the city, which is also the state line, crossing into Minnesota as Trunk Highway 26.

== History ==
Prior to its current designation in 1969, there were two iterations of Iowa Highway 26. The first, Primary Road No. 26, was a short, 3-mile-long (4.8 km) highway which, in the 1920s, connected Rock Valley to Primary Road No. 19 in northwestern Iowa.

The second Iowa 26 was created in the 1930s and served as a connector between U.S. Highway 18 at Inwood and Iowa 9 south of Larchwood. In 1969, the second iteration of Iowa 26 swapped designations with Iowa 182, as to match Minnesota's Trunk Highway 26.

== Major intersections ==
The entire route is in Allamakee County.

Location	mi	km	Destinations	Notes
Lansing	0.000	0.000	Iowa 9 west / Great River Road south / WIS 82 east (Black Hawk Bridge) – De Soto, Wis., Waukon	
New Albin	11.370	18.298	MN 26 north / Great River Road north – La Crescent	Continuation into Minnesota
1.000 mi = 1.609 km; 1.000 km = 0.621 mi

== See also ==
- List of state highways in Iowa
