= Granite, Iowa =

- Unincorporated community
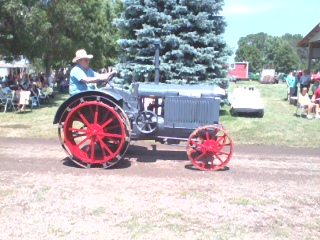
- Antique tractor in the parade at the Granite Threshing Bee

- Location within Iowa Location within the United States
- Coordinates: 43°28′08″N 96°33′23″W
- Country: United States
- State: Iowa
- County: Lyon
- Township: Sioux
- Established: June 12, 1886
- Elevation: 1,309 ft (399 m)
- Time zone: UTC-6 (Central (CST))
  - Summer (DST): UTC-5 (CDT)
- Area code: 712
- GNIS feature ID: 464568

Granite is an unincorporated community in Sioux Township, Lyon County, Iowa, United States, near the historic Blood Run Site and the Gitchie Manitou State Preserve.

== Geography ==
Granite is the most northwestern community in Iowa near the banks of the Big Sioux River, about 7 miles outside the city limits of Sioux Falls, South Dakota, it is also 6 miles west/northwest of Larchwood. It is located 2.5 miles west of Iowa Highway 9, 2 miles south of the South Dakota state line and 1 mile west.

== History ==
Granite was founded on June 12, 1886, at the request of the owners of the land, Richard and Bessie Pettigrew. The community of Iuka was then officially filed on March 14, 1887. The name of Iuka later on changed to Granite in late 1887. Granite's population was 53 in 1902, and 51 in 1925. The population was also 51 in 1940.

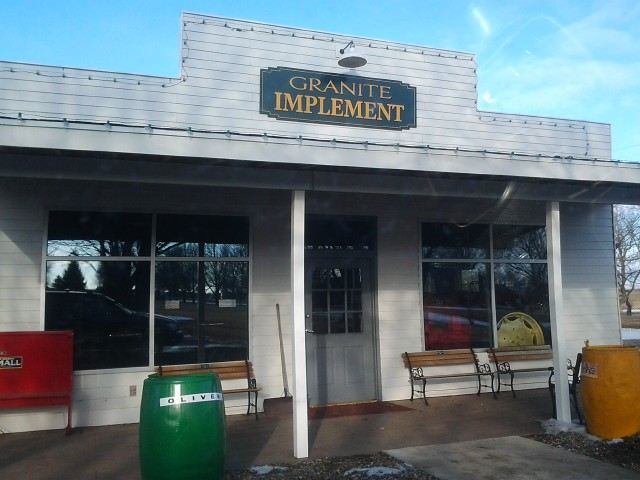
A model building of an Old Tractor Implement that is opened for display during the Threshing Bee

== Industry and Threshing Bee ==
A manufacturing company called Miller Loaders exists on the East Side of town. It creates loader attachments for tractors and other machinery. Granite is also known for the Granite Threshing Bee held on the third weekend in July. A demonstration of Wheat Threshing, a kids tractor pull, a lunch, tours of the Blood Run Site, and a parade featuring old tractors and cars are the highlights of the Bee.
