= West Lyon Community School District =

Public school district in Inwood, Iowa, United States

Coordinates: 43.391707°N 96.429952°W

Location
- Inwood, Iowa Lyon County and Sioux County United States
- Coordinates: 43.391707, -96.429952

District information
- Type: Local school district
- Grades: K-12
- Superintendent: Terry Bruinsma
- Schools: 3
- Budget: $13,473,000 (2020-21)
- NCES District ID: 1931020

Students and staff
- Students: 996 (2022-23)
- Teachers: 65.57 FTE
- Staff: 58.72 FTE
- Student–teacher ratio: 15.19
- Athletic conference: Siouxland
- District mascot: Wildcats
- Colors: Blue and White

Other information
- Website: www.wlwildcats.org

West Lyon Community School District is a rural public school district headquartered in Inwood, Iowa. The district is mostly within Lyon County, with a small area in Sioux County, and serves the towns of Inwood, Alvord, Larchwood, and Lester, and the surrounding rural areas.

The district was formed in 1960, and for a few years, the district operated two separate schools: West Lyon North, serving Larchwood and Lester, and West Lyon South, serving Inwood and Alvord. Eventually, this was reduced to just a single school, serving the four towns of Alvord, Inwood, Larchwood, and Lester.

Terry Bruinsma has served as superintendent since 2026, after serving as principal at Spirit Lake.

== Schools ==
The district operates three schools in a single building at 1787 182nd Street, Inwood:

- West Lyon High School
- West Lyon Junior High School
- West Lyon Elementary School

=== West Lyon High School ===
==== Athletics ====
The Wildcats are members of the Siouxland Conference, and participate in the following sports:

- Football
  - 6-time State Champions (1998, 1999, 2010, 2013, 2019, 2025)
- Cross Country
- Volleyball
- Basketball
  - Boys' 2014 Class 1A State Champions
- Wrestling
- Golf
- Track and Field
  - Boys' 2000 Class 2A State Champions
- Baseball
- Softball

== See also ==
- List of school districts in Iowa
- List of high schools in Iowa
