= Kyle Vanden Bosch =

American football player (born 1978)

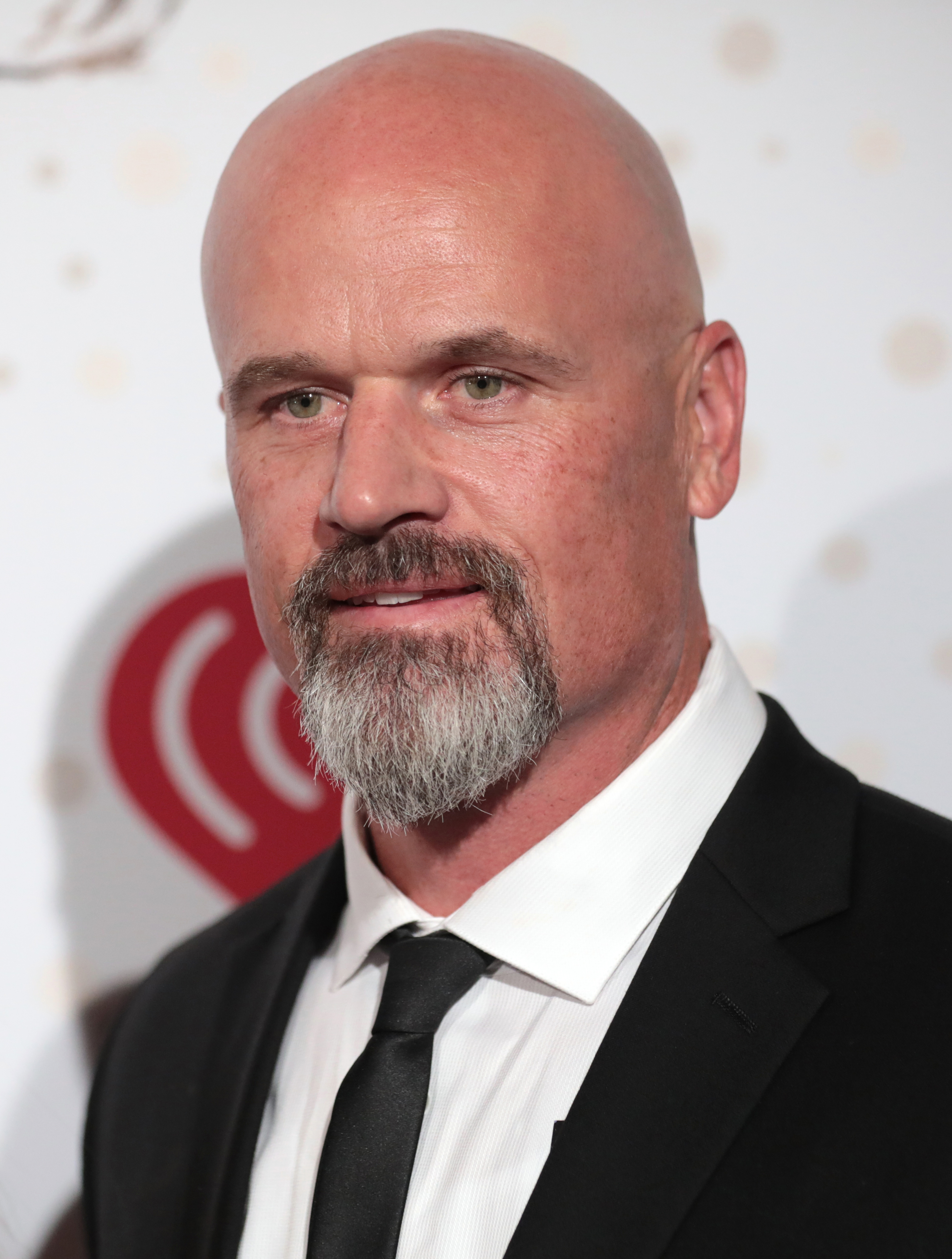
- Vanden Bosch in 2023

No. 93
- Position: Defensive end

Personal information
- Born: November 17, 1978 (age 47); Larchwood, Iowa, U.S.
- Listed height: 6 ft 4 in (1.93 m)
- Listed weight: 278 lb (126 kg)

Career information
- High school: West Lyon (Inwood, Iowa)
- College: Nebraska (1997–2000)
- NFL draft: 2001: 2nd round, 34th overall pick

Career history
- Arizona Cardinals (2001–2004); Tennessee Titans (2005–2009); Detroit Lions (2010–2012)

Awards and highlights
- 3× Pro Bowl (2005, 2007, 2009); National champion (1997); Draddy Trophy (2000); Second-team All-Big 12 (2000)

Career NFL statistics
- Total tackles: 464
- Sacks: 58
- Forced fumbles: 20
- Fumble recoveries: 6
- Defensive touchdowns: 1
- Stats at Pro Football Reference

Kyle Dale Vanden Bosch (born November 17, 1978) is an American former professional football player who was a defensive end for 12 seasons in the National Football League (NFL). He played college football for the Nebraska Cornhuskers and was selected by the Arizona Cardinals in the second round of the 2001 NFL draft. He also played for the Tennessee Titans and Detroit Lions before retiring following the 2012 NFL season. He is currently a post-game commentator for the Arizona Cardinals on 98.7 Arizona Sports Radio.

== Early life ==
Vanden Bosch went to high school at West Lyon High School of rural Larchwood, Iowa. He earned All-America honors at West Lyon Community Register High School Male Athlete of the Year and the USA Today/Gatorade Player of the Year for Iowa and Midwest Region. He started three years at fullback and four at linebacker at West Lyon. As senior, rushed 136 times for 812 yards and 18 touchdowns while recording 83 tackles, 14 sacks, and one interception. Vanden Bosch set school's scoring record with 264 career points. In addition, he earned 4.0 grade-point average and was two-time National Honor Society member.

== College career ==
Vanden Bosch attended the University of Nebraska–Lincoln, where he played for the Nebraska Cornhuskers football team. He started his final 23 games at Nebraska, closing his career with 142 total tackles, 13 sacks, 34 tackles for loss, and 46 quarterback pressures. As a senior, he was First-team All-Big 12 Conference. He also was Academic All-Big 12 for the third consecutive year. He set Nebraska's single-season record with three blocked kicks — two field-goal attempts and one point-after-touchdown try — as a sophomore in 1998. He was named Nebraska lifter-of-the-year three consecutive times from 1998 to 2000 after adding 40 pounds to his frame upon arriving on campus. He graduated with a 3.82 grade-point average and a bachelor's degree in finance in December 2000. Vanden Bosch was also a member of the Society of Innocents and awarded the NFF National Scholar-Athlete Award, for academic excellence.

== Professional career ==
=== Pre-draft ===
Pre-draft measurables
Height	Weight	40-yard dash	10-yard split	20-yard split	20-yard shuttle	Three-cone drill	Vertical jump	Broad jump	Bench press	Wonderlic
6 ft 4 1/8 in (1.93 m)	270 lb (122 kg)	4.76 s	1.71 s	2.81 s	4.08 s	6.82 s	36 1/2 in (0.93 m)	9 ft 11 in (3.02 m)	26 reps	27
All values from NFL Combine

=== Arizona Cardinals ===
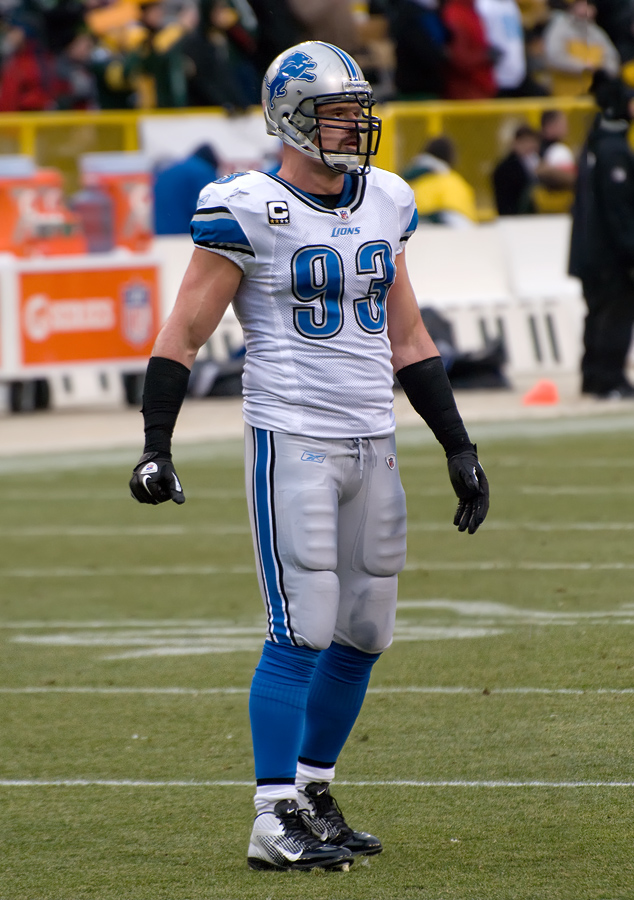
Kyle Vanden Bosch with the Lions.

Vanden Bosch was drafted by the Arizona Cardinals in the second round of the 2001 NFL draft. In his injury-abbreviated rookie season he finished with 12 tackles (6 solo), one quarterback sack, one hurry, one pass defended, and one fumble return for touchdown. In 2002, he returned from reconstructive knee surgery to lead Arizona with four quarterback sacks, nine hurries, and eight tackles for loss in 16 starts. He also totaled 66 tackles and one fumble recovery. Kyle was on injured reserve for the entire 2003 season after suffering a torn ACL in left knee. In 2004, he saw action in every game for Cardinals, including one start and totaled 15 tackles.

=== Tennessee Titans ===
In his first season with the Tennessee Titans in 2005, Vanden Bosch started all 16 games and made his first Pro Bowl after finishing second in the AFC and fourth in the NFL with 12.5 sacks. He recorded 100 total tackles as well. Vanden Bosch replaced Miami Dolphins player Jason Taylor in the 2006 Pro Bowl. On February 17, 2006 (only a week after his two-sack performance in the Pro Bowl), it was announced that Vanden Bosch had agreed to terms with the Tennessee Titans. The contract tied him to the Titans for four years. The deal gave him $14.5 million in guaranteed money ($5 million signing bonus, with guaranteed base salaries for three of the four years on the contract).

In 2006, Vanden Bosch started all 16 games at left defensive end. His season totals included 6.5 sacks, 118 tackles, 30 quarterback pressures, four tackles for loss and one forced fumble. The next season, 2007, he started all 16 games at defensive end for the third consecutive season and was named as a starter for the Pro Bowl. He led the team and finished sixth in the AFC with 12 sacks. He finished second on the team with 115 tackles and 24 quarterback pressures. Tied for the team lead with four forced fumbles. He was Named AFC Defensive Player of the Week after registering 12 tackles, three sacks and a forced fumble against New York Jets (December 23, 2007). In 2008, Vanden Bosch was voted a team captain for the 2008 season by his teammates. He played and started in 10 games and made 24 tackles and 4.5 sacks and finished fourth on the team with 18 quarterback pressures.

=== Detroit Lions ===
On March 5, 2010, Vanden Bosch was signed to a four-year, $26 million deal with the Detroit Lions. The move reunited him with Jim Schwartz, his old defensive coordinator from Tennessee who at the time was head coach of the Detroit Lions.

On February 5, 2013, Vanden Bosch was released from the Detroit Lions.
