= Edna, Iowa =

- Unincorporated community
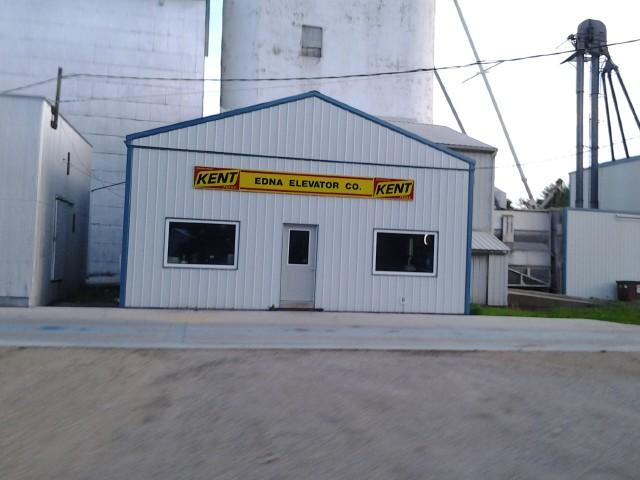
- The Edna Elevator

- Location within Iowa Location within the United States
- Coordinates: 43°23′06″N 96°05′40″W
- Country: United States
- State: Iowa
- County: Lyon
- Township: Liberal

Area
  - Total: 0.05 sq mi (0.13 km^{2})
  - Land: 0.05 sq mi (0.13 km^{2})
  - Water: 0 sq mi (0 km^{2})
- Elevation: 1,414 ft (431 m)
- Time zone: UTC-6 (Central (CST))
  - Summer (DST): UTC-5 (CDT)
- ZIP code: 51246
- Area code: 712
- GNIS feature ID: 456245

Edna is an unincorporated town in Liberal Township, Lyon County, Iowa, United States.

Edna is located on the western border of Liberal Township in Lyon County. It is located 6 miles (10 km) southeast of Rock Rapids, the county seat.

The town consists of about 10 houses, a couple of outbuildings and sheds, and in the center of town stands the Edna Grain Elevator.

== History ==
Edna was founded in the 1800s; its population was 28 in 1902, and 35 in 1925. The population was 35 in 1940.
