= Blood Run Site =

Coordinates: 43.47°N 96.58°W

- U.S. National Register of Historic Places
- U.S. National Historic Landmark
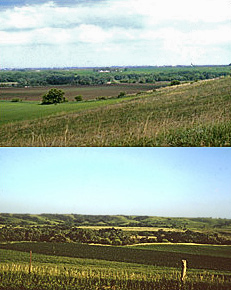
- Nearest city: Sioux Falls, South Dakota, Granite, Iowa, and Canton, South Dakota
- Built: 1300 (possibly built over three millennia) though the site was inhabited regularly for 8500 years in other than mound era dwelling.
- Architect: Ho-Chunk, Ioway, Otoe, Missouri
- Architectural style: Civic, Ceremonial, Effigy, and Burial Mounds. Including a 1.25 miles (2.01 km) long snake mound destroyed for railroad fill (1930s).
- NRHP reference No.: 70000246

Significant dates
- Added to NRHP: August 29, 1970
- Designated NHL: August 29, 1970

The Blood Run Site is an archaeological site on the border of the US states of Iowa and South Dakota. The site was essentially populated for 8,500 years, within which earthworks structures were built by the Oneota Culture and occupied by descendant tribes such as the Ioway, Otoe, Missouri, and shared with Quapaw and later Kansa, Osage, and Omaha (who were both Omaha and Ponca at the time) people. The site was so named on account of the iron-stained soil.

== History ==
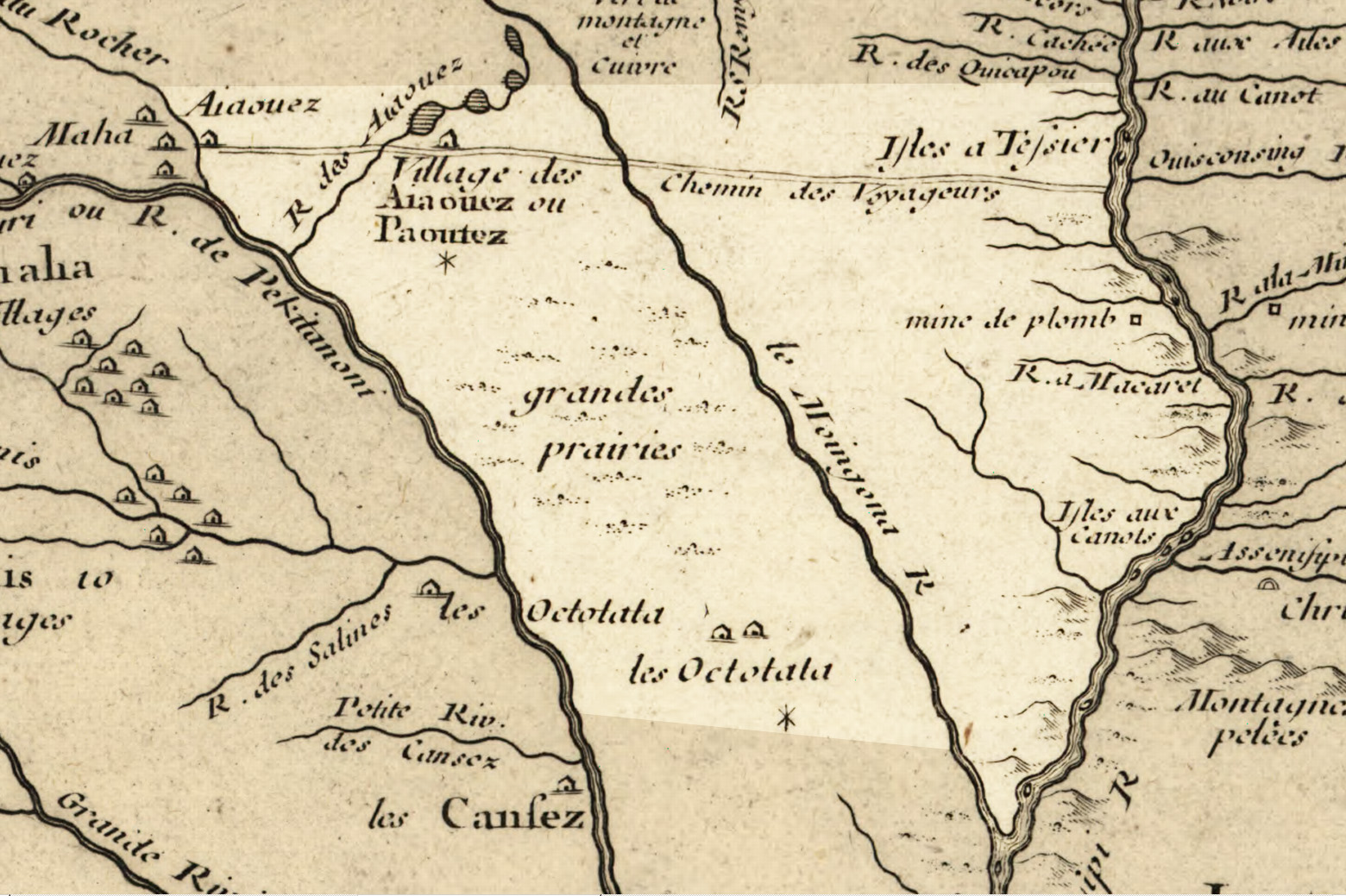
Iowa in 1718, showing cluster of Ioway (Aiouez) and Omaha (Maha) villages in the northwest, possibly including Blood Run; Guillaume Delisle map.

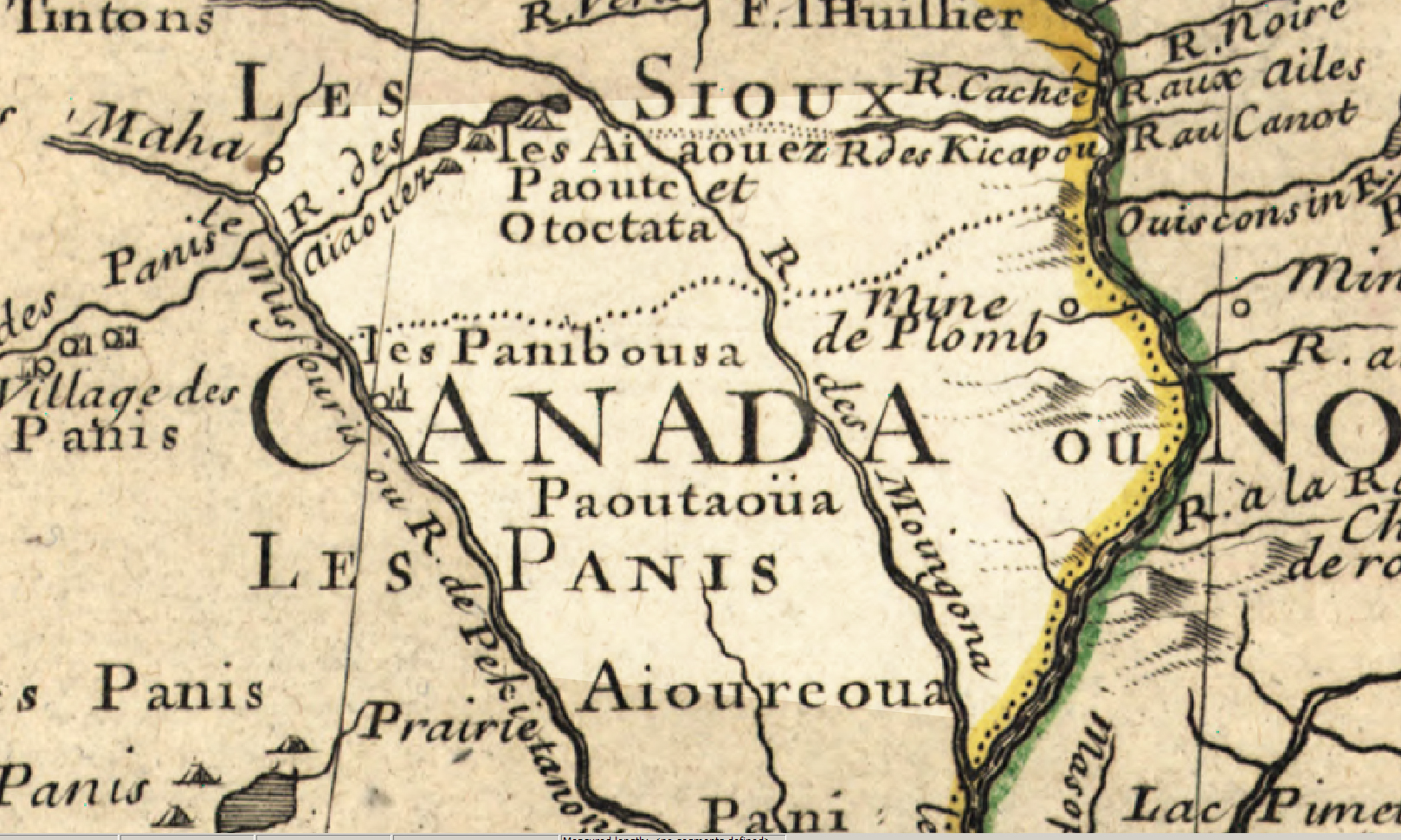
Iowa in 1798, showing villages, possibly Blood Run, labeled as Omhaha (Maha). Nearby tribes include Pawnee (Panis/Panibousa), Ioway (Aiaouez/Aioureoua and Paoute/Paoutaoua), Dakota (Sioux); contemporary state line highlighted.

Arikara, Dakota, and Cheyenne were regular traders with the village and Nakota/Dakota and Arikara people also regularly resided there in later years. The site overlaps the Iowa and South Dakota border, near Sioux Falls, South Dakota, between Granite, Iowa, and Harrisburg, South Dakota.

Although declared a National Historic Landmark in 1970, its integrity is endangered by gravel quarrying and looting. The site was substantially looted and areas wholly destroyed by settlers and looters through the late 1930s and by subsequent generations of collectors. A possible snake mound rivaling the Serpent Mound in Ohio was used for railroad fill.

Blood Run was mapped in the early 18th century by French voyageurs trading with the village, which was then populated largely by Omaha people, but other cultures shared the area, about 480 mounds existed and a population of 10,000 Native people was documented in the corresponding census. In the late 19th century, 176 mounds were still visible. Today 78 mounds still exist, mostly burial. In 1987, the State of Iowa acquired a prominent portion of the site for a state park. The State of South Dakota Game, Fish, and Parks Commission, upon offer of land sale by owners Buzz and Lois Nelson and the sole civilian testimony by SD author of Blood Run (book) (a volume supported by a SD Arts Council Grant) and Sioux Falls Public Schools and Office of Indian Education teacher, Allison Hedge Coke, the Commission voted to acquire the area as state park land in January 2003. Doug Hofer was a supportive presence at the hearing.

In December 2011, South Dakota Governor Dennis Daugaard announced that an agreement was reached on the purchase option for 324 acres in the Blood Run Historical Landmark area on the Lincoln County, S.D., side of the Big Sioux River. "South Dakota Department of Game, Fish and Parks, the Parks and Wildlife Foundation and The Conservation Fund to acquire the property for $3.5 million before the end of the year, according to the governor’s office." "The Conservation Fund will purchase and hold the majority of the Nelson property until funds are available and then transfer it to the state of South Dakota."

== See also ==
- Iowa archaeology
- Indians of Iowa
- Gitchie Manitou State Preserve
- List of National Historic Landmarks in Iowa
- List of National Historic Landmarks in South Dakota
- National Register of Historic Places listings in Lyon County, Iowa
- National Register of Historic Places listings in Lincoln County, South Dakota
