= Allison Township, Lyon County, Iowa =

Township in Lyon County, Iowa, United States

Coordinates: 43°28′N 96°16′W

Allison Township is a township in Lyon County, Iowa, United States.
