= Broad View Ranch Historic District =

Historic district in Iowa, United States

- U.S. National Register of Historic Places
- U.S. Historic district
- Location within Iowa Location within the United States
- Location: 4324 180th St.
- Nearest city: Sheldon, Iowa
- Coordinates: 43°16′33″N 95°54′01″W
- Area: 39 acres (16 ha)
- MPS: Historic Farmsteads of Lyon County MPS
- NRHP reference No.: 94001137
- Added to NRHP: September 23, 1994

The Broad View Ranch Historic District is a nationally recognized agricultural historic district located northwest of Sheldon, Iowa, United States. It was listed on the National Register of Historic Places in 1994. At the time of its nomination, it contained 19 resources, which included nine contributing buildings, one contributing site, four contributing structures, and two non-contributing structures.

Charles F. Peters was a native of Prussia who immigrated to the United States in 1868 at 18 years old. He bought his first quarter section of land in Lyon County in 1882, and began a cattle operation. Initially, his cattle grazed freely on unoccupied land, but as the county became more populated, he acquired two more sections. Eventually, his land holdings grew to 1,200 acres (490 ha). He constructed buildings for his operations, including the 1889 main barn, the cattle barn, silo barn, and granary all constructed in 1890. He built his Italianate house in 1896, which has been significantly altered in subsequent years. Other domestic structures included buildings to store coal, ice, and house laying hens. A grove of hardwoods that was planted on the north and west edges of the farmstead forming a wind break is a contributing site. The ranch remains in the Peters family.
