= Big Sioux Prehistoric Prairie Procurement System Archaeological District =

Historic district in Iowa, United States

- U.S. National Register of Historic Places
- U.S. Historic district
- Location: Address restricted
- NRHP reference No.: 88001169
- Added to NRHP: January 17, 1989

Big Sioux Prehistoric Prairie Procurement System Archaeological District is a discontiguous historic district of 30 sites located along 15 miles (24 km) of river terraces and blufftops near the ghost town of Klondike in Lyon County, Iowa. The sites are both large and small in size and they "contain a representative sample of the best preserved elements of a hunting and gathering system" of the native peoples who inhabited the northwest Iowa plains from 10,000 to 200 years ago. They include late base camps, deeply-buried early Archaic camps, and procurement sites from all time periods in the Pre-Columbian era. The district was listed on the National Register of Historic Places in 1989.
