= Reno, Minnesota =

Unincorporated community in Minnesota, United States

Reno
- Unincorporated community
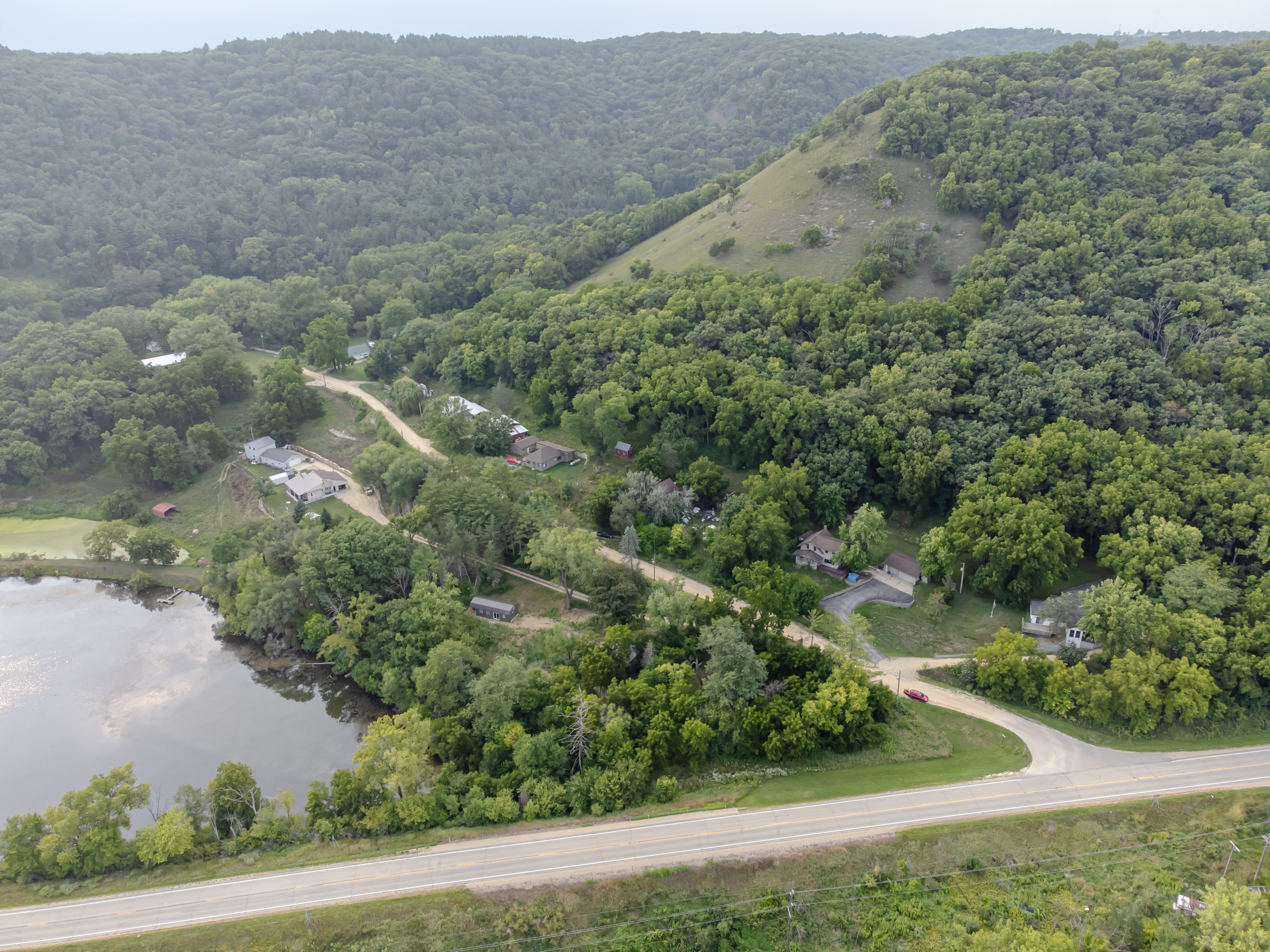

- Location within Minnesota Location within the United States
- Coordinates: 43°36′04″N 91°16′30″W
- Country: United States
- State: Minnesota
- County: Houston County
- Township: Crooked Creek Township
- Elevation: 673 ft (205 m)
- Time zone: UTC-6 (Central (CST))
  - Summer (DST): UTC-5 (CDT)
- ZIP code: 55919 and 55921
- Area code: 507
- GNIS feature ID: 649929

Reno is an unincorporated community in Crooked Creek Township, Houston County, Minnesota

The community is located between La Crescent, Minnesota and New Albin, Iowa on State Highway 26 (MN 26). Reno is located near the junction of Highway 26 and Houston County Road 249.

Clear Creek and Crooked Creek both flow through the community, with the Mississippi River located nearby.

Nearby places include Brownsville, Caledonia, and Eitzen. Reno had a post office from 1880 to 1935. The community was named for Jesse L. Reno, a Union officer killed in the American Civil War during the Battle of South Mountain.
