= Wheeler Township, Lyon County, Iowa =

Township in Lyon County, Iowa, United States

Coordinates: 43°18′N 96°02′W

Wheeler Township is a township in Lyon County, Iowa, United States.
