= Black Hawk Bridge =

Black Hawk Bridge (Original)
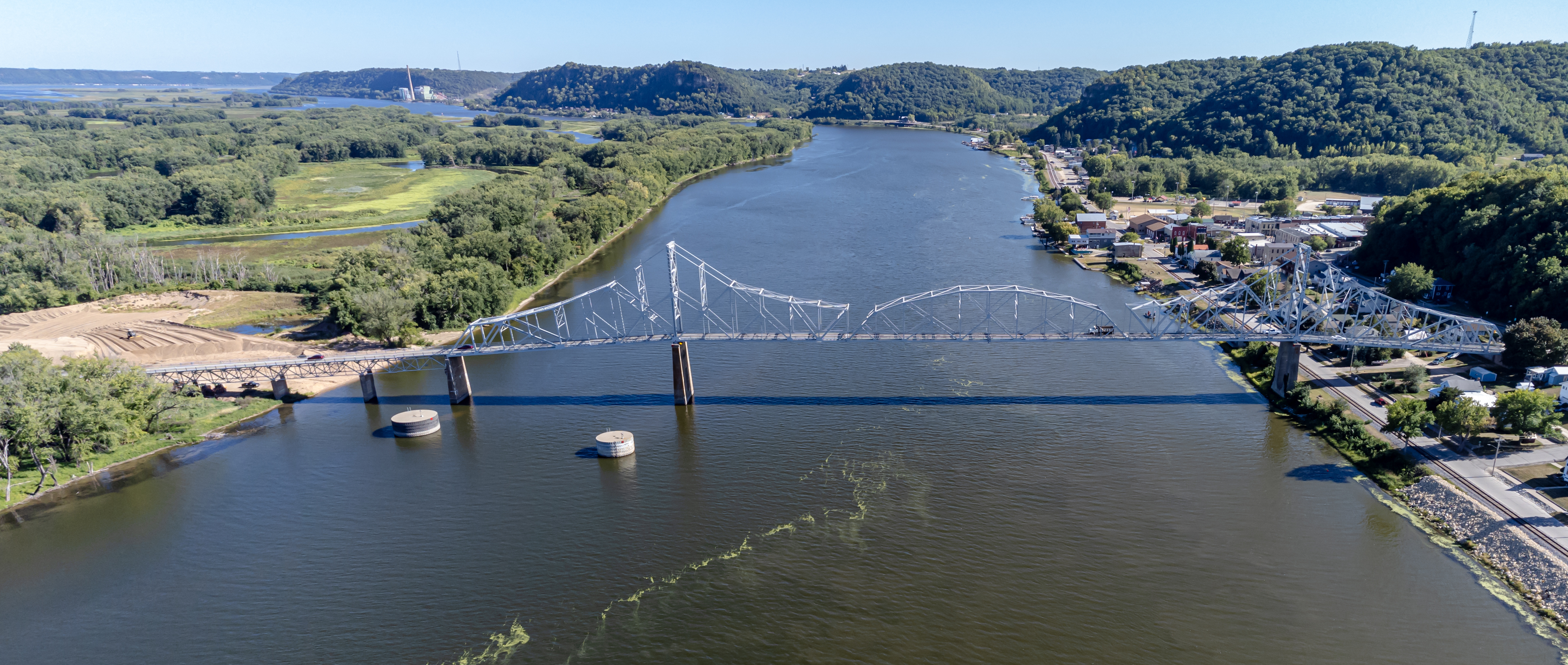
- Coordinates: 43°21′55″N 91°12′54″W
- Carried: 2 lanes of Iowa 9 / WIS 82
- Crossed: Upper Mississippi River
- Locale: Lansing, Iowa and Crawford County, Wisconsin, River Mile 663.4
- Other name: Lansing Bridge
- Maintained by: Iowa Department of Transportation
- ID number: NBI 000000000013520

Characteristics
- Design: Cantilever through truss
- Total length: 1,653 feet (504 m)
- Width: 21 feet (6 m), 2 lanes
- Longest span: 653 feet (199 m)
- Clearance below: 68 feet (21 m)

History
- Opened: June 17, 1931; 95 years ago
- Closed: October 20, 2025; 12 months ago
- Demolished: December 19, 2025; 10 months ago

Statistics
- Daily traffic: 2,357 (2003)
- Toll: None

Location
- Interactive map of Black Hawk Bridge (Original)

The original Black Hawk Bridge spanned the Mississippi River, joining the town of Lansing, in Allamakee County, Iowa, to rural Crawford County, Wisconsin. It was demolished with explosives on December 19, 2025. A temporary car ferry operates while the replacement bridge is under construction. Completion of the new bridge is estimated for November 2026. It opened November 6, 2026.

== Original Bridge ==
Named for Chief Black Hawk, it was popularly referred to as the "Lansing bridge". It carried Iowa Highway 9 and Wisconsin Highway 82. It was the northernmost Mississippi River bridge in Iowa.

This riveted cantilever through truss bridge had one of the more unusual designs of any Mississippi River bridge. Construction started in 1929 and was completed in 1931. The designer and chief engineer was Melvin B. Stone. The McClintic-Marshall Company of Chicago erected the trusses. The steel came from the Inland Steel Company.

The bridge had five reinforced concrete piers. Pier 2 and Pier 3, which were the critical piers in the river, were founded on 143 timber piles, each at least 40 feet (12 m) long. The piles did not reach the river bedrock. Scour had been observed around and beneath the piers. Iowa DOT had dumped large stone against the bottom of the pier to maintain the bridge pier integrity.

The Wisconsin approach had a long causeway over Winneshiek bottoms (sloughs, ponds, and backwaters) before ramping up to the bridge itself. The main shipping channel is on the Iowa side. The Iowa approach was rather abrupt, going from a 25 miles per hour (40 km/h) city street straight up a steep ramp onto the bridge.

Originally a privately built and operated bridge owned by the Iowa-Wisconsin Bridge Company, it was closed between 1945 and 1957, due to damage from ice damming, and lacking funds to repair the bridge, the company went out of business. The two states acquired the bridge and repaired it.

== Closure ==
The bridge was subject to periodic closures: in August 2011 the bridge was briefly closed for repairs after a crack was found in a floor beam.

The Iowa Department of Transportation again closed the Black Hawk Bridge temporarily on February 25, 2024, citing structural integrity concerns following movement of two bridge piers. The department performed emergency repairs, reopening the bridge to traffic on April 20, 2024. On May 18, 2025, the bridge was closed again due to a shifting pier, with a temporary passenger-only water taxi service beginning June 4, 2025. The bridge was re-opened June 9, 2025; additional closes were expected related to construction of the new bridge. The old bridge permanently closed on October 20, 2025, to safely allow for continued construction of the new bridge and demolition of the old bridge; leaving no direct road crossing for about 2 years. A temporary car ferry service across the river began November 3, 2025. The old bridge was imploded on December 19, 2025, with its large central superstructure dropped into the Mississippi River.

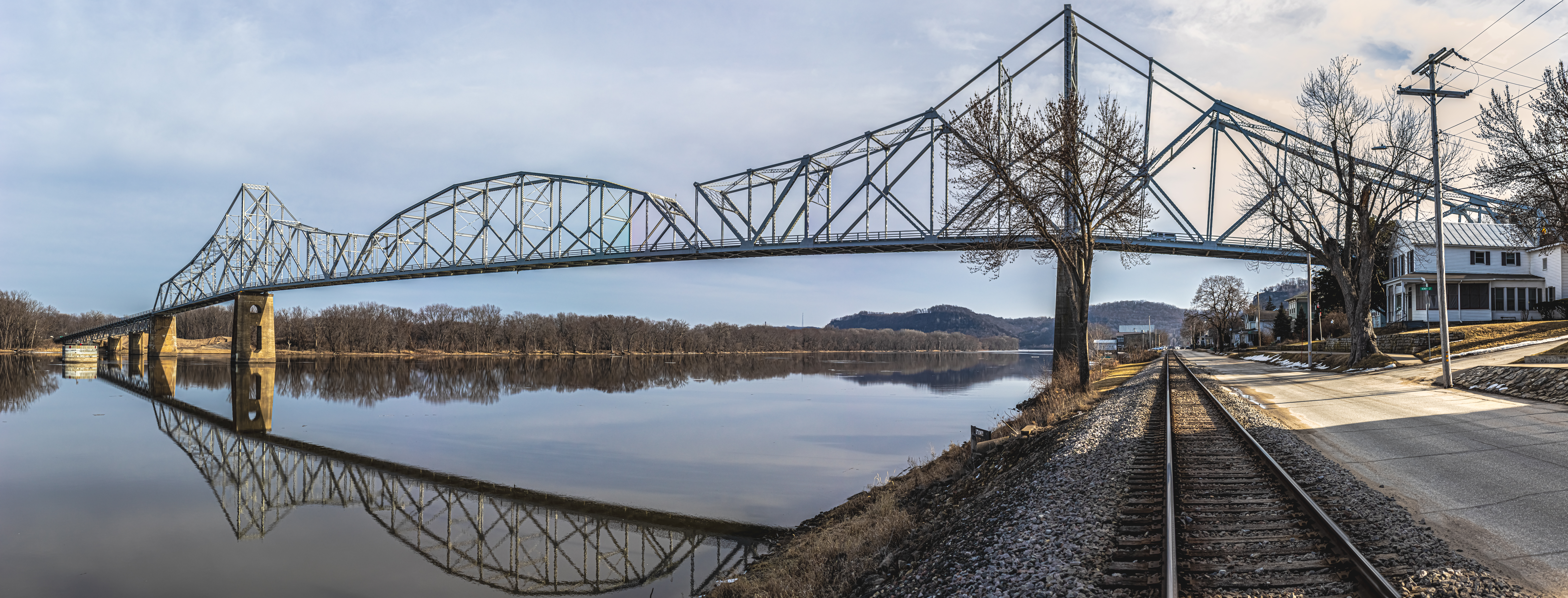
Old Black Hawk Bridge from Wisconsin to Iowa

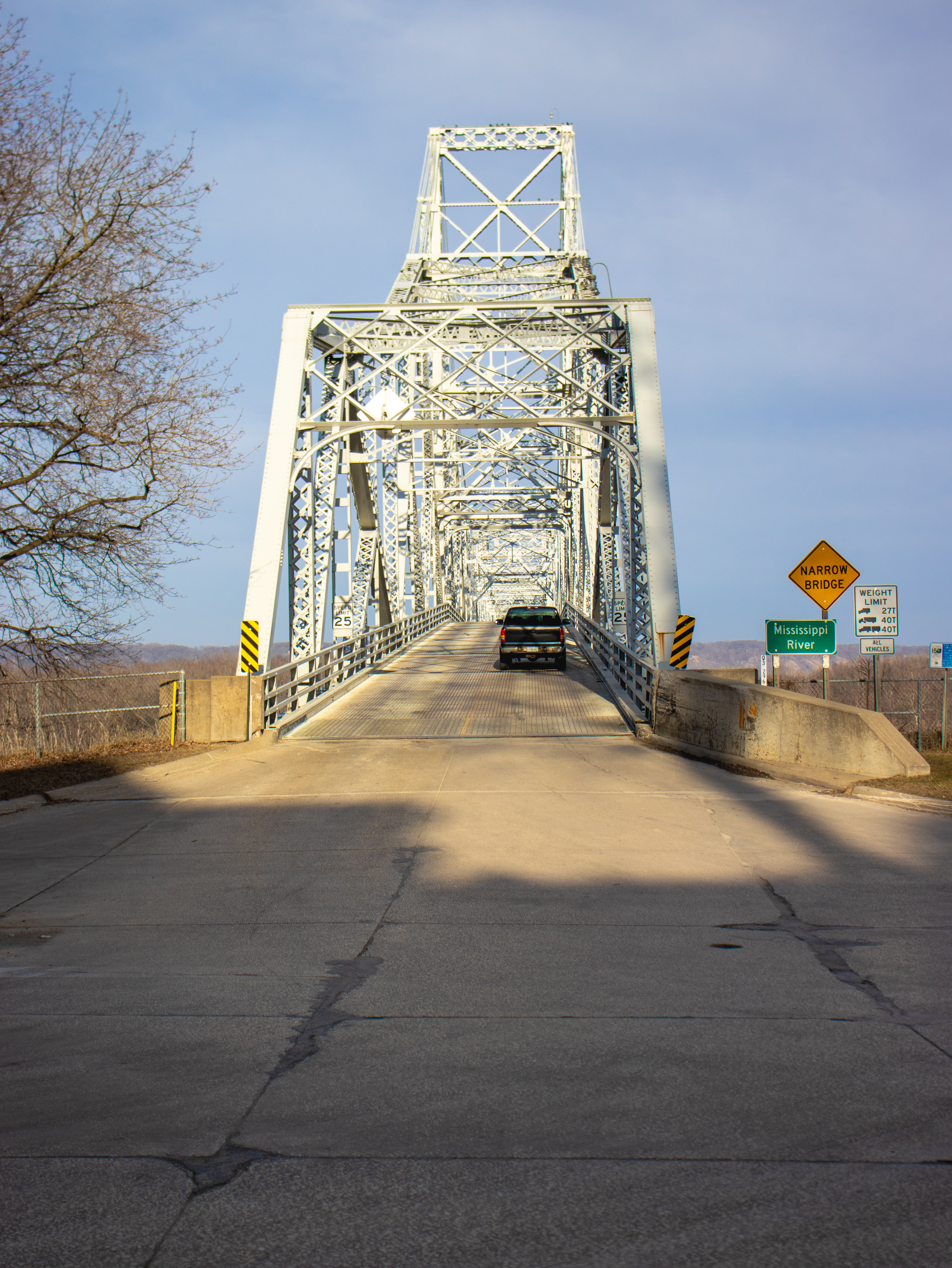
The old Black Hawk Bridge road was narrow.

== Replacement ==
The old bridge had a sufficiency rating of 39.9 percent, which mainly reflected its obsolete nature. The Iowa Department of Transportation began planning for a replacement bridge with feasibility studies beginning in 2004. It was revealed during a meeting on June 15, 2021, that the replacement bridge's design would be extremely similar to the current bridge's design while either retaining the pier's design or adopting a newer wave design. A design similar to the original bridge was ultimately chosen; construction of the new bridge began in September 2023. The bridge will open on November 6, 2026.

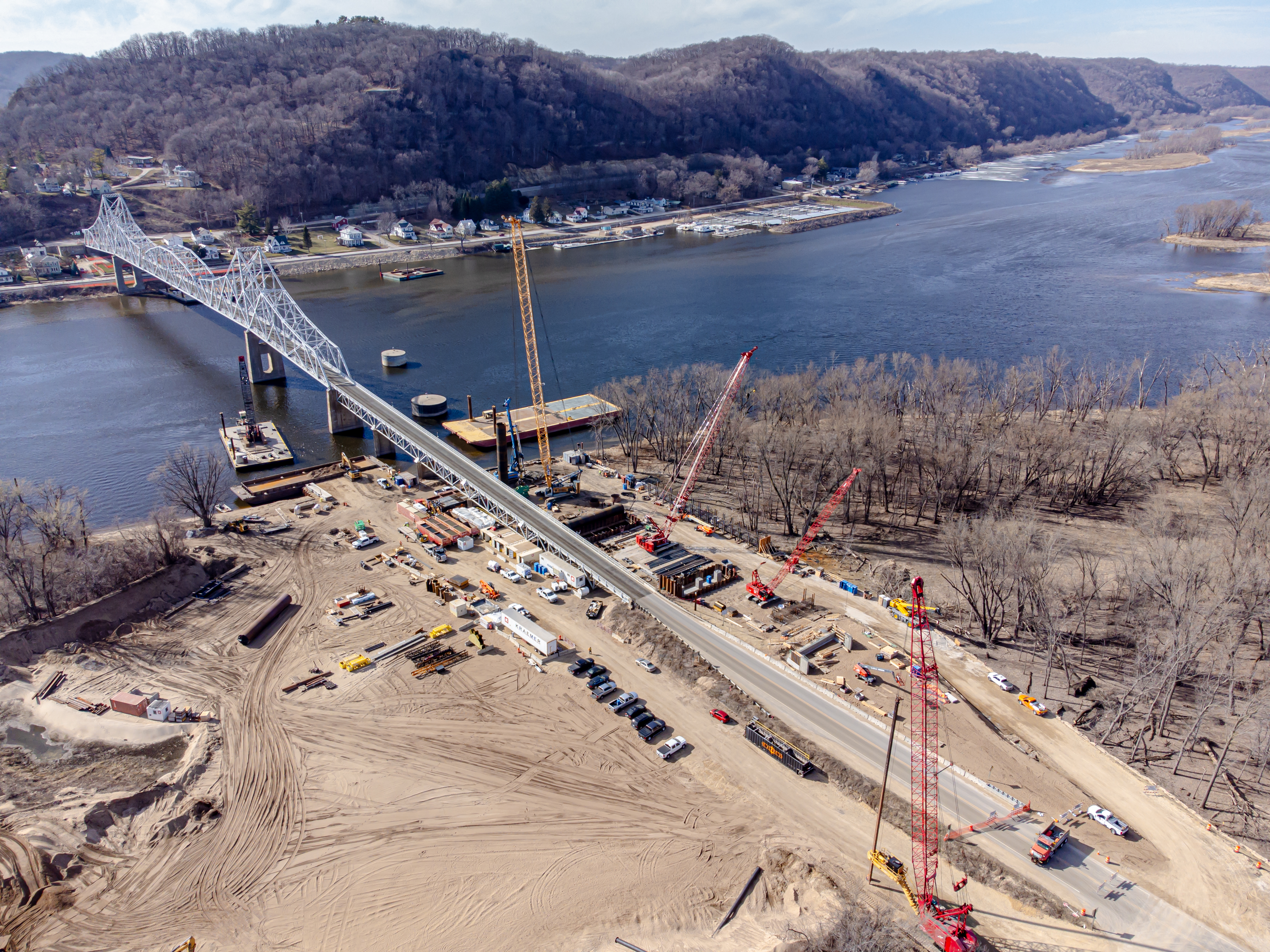
Lansing (Black Hawk Bridge) construction and temporary closure of the old bridge, February 27, 2024

The new Black Hawk Bridge in November 2026

== In popular culture ==
The old bridge was featured in a scene from the 1999 film The Straight Story, when Alvin Straight is depicted crossing the Mississippi River near the end of his 240-mile (386 km) journey.

== See also ==
- List of crossings of the Upper Mississippi River
- List of bridges documented by the Historic American Engineering Record in Iowa
- List of bridges documented by the Historic American Engineering Record in Wisconsin
