= Elgin Township, Lyon County, Iowa =

Township in Lyon County, Iowa, United States

Coordinates: 43°28′N 95°55′W

Elgin Township is a township in Lyon County, Iowa, United States.
