= Grant Township, Lyon County, Iowa =

Township in Lyon County, Iowa, United States

Coordinates: 43°23′N 95°55′W

Grant Township is a township in Lyon County, Iowa, United States.
