= Minnesota State Highway 26 =

State highway in Minnesota, United States

Trunk Highway 26

- MN 26 highlighted in red

Route information
- Maintained by MnDOT
- Length: 21.121 mi (33.991 km)
- Existed: 1933–present
- Tourist routes: Great River Road

Major junctions
- South end: Iowa 26 near New Albin, Iowa, at the Minnesota — Iowa state line
- North end: MN 16 near La Crescent

Location
- Country: United States
- State: Minnesota
- Counties: Houston

Highway system
- Minnesota Trunk Highway System; Interstate; US; State; Legislative; Scenic
← MN 25	→ MN 27

Minnesota State Highway 26 (MN 26) is a state highway in southeastern corner of the U.S. state of Minnesota. At 21 miles (34 km) in length, Highway 26 runs parallel to the Mississippi River and is a portion of the Great River Road. The route begins at the Iowa state line where it continues as Iowa Highway 26, and ends at an intersection with Minnesota State Highway 16 south of La Crescent.

== Route description ==
State Highway 26 serves as a north–south route in southeast Minnesota between La Crescent, MN and Lansing, IA. The route follows a scenic path along the Mississippi River; as such, it makes up a section of the Great River Road. Because it is located in the Driftless Area, the Mississippi carved out a deep river valley, leaving high undulating bluffs which loom 300 feet (91 m) above the highway. Highway 26 is nestled between the base of the bluffs and the river channel.

MN 26 begins at the Iowa state line near New Albin, Iowa, where Iowa Highway 26 continues across the border to the south. Immediately upon entering Minnesota, Highway 26 enters the Richard J. Dorer State Forest. For its first 7 miles (11 km), Highway 26 borders the backwaters of the Mississippi River, which lies 2 miles (3.2 km) to the east. Near Reno, the river widens at the pool behind Lock and Dam No. 8.

Highway 26 continues north along the Mississippi River and the Iowa, Chicago and Eastern Railroad line towards Brownsville. North of Brownsville, Highway 26 begins to turn inland away from the river. Six miles (9.7 km) north of Brownsville, Highway 26 ends at a T intersection with Minnesota State Highway 16, near the Root River and the city of La Crescent.

The highway is defined as Route 198 in the Minnesota Statutes. It is not marked with this number.

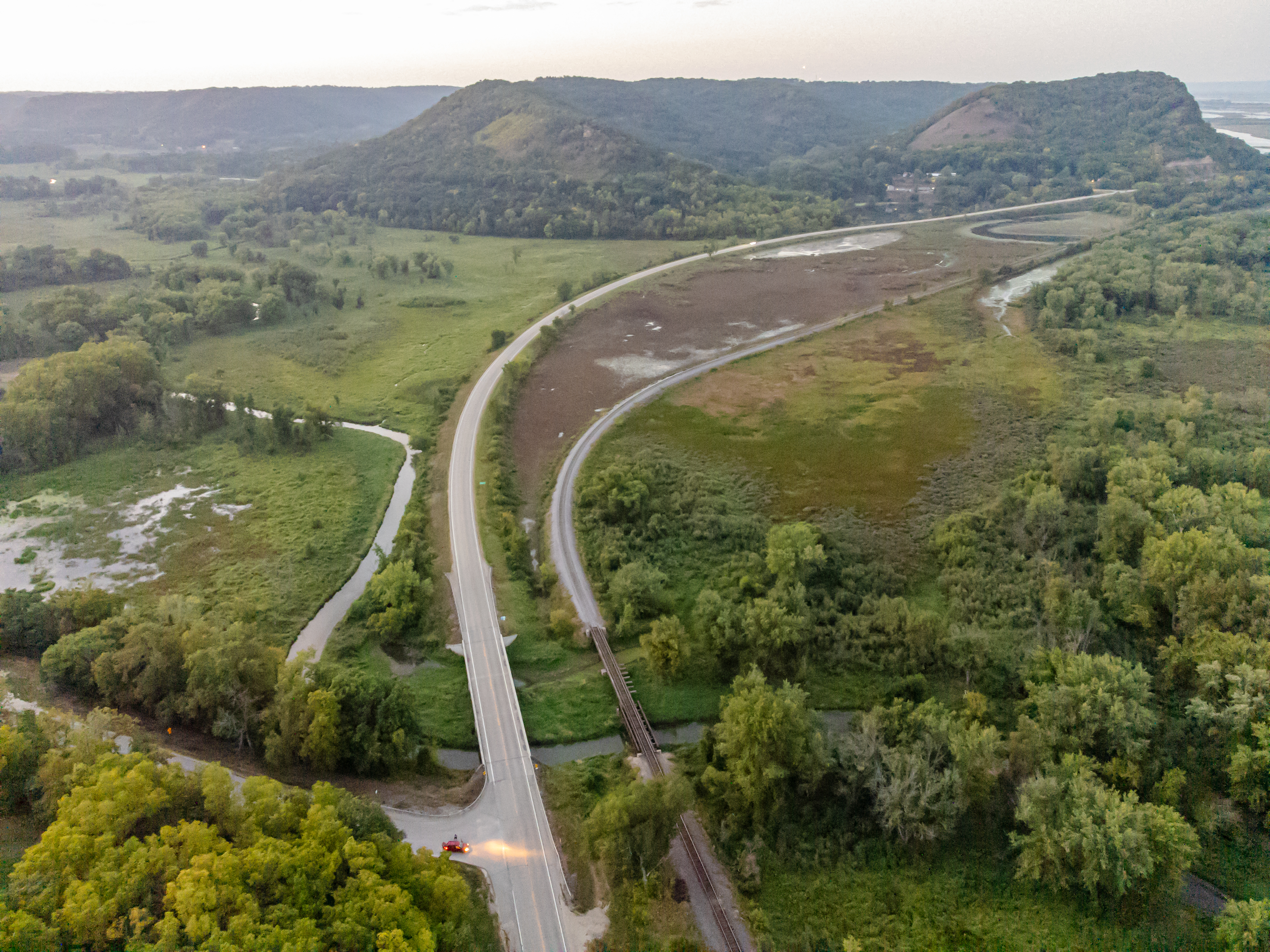
Aerial view of Highway 26 South of Reno looking north

== History ==
Highway 26 was authorized April 22, 1933. It originally connected Iowa Highway 182 and U.S. Highway 16. Iowa Highway 182 became Iowa Highway 26 in 1969, and U.S. 16 became Minnesota State Highway 16 in 1980.

The roadway was gravel when marked. It was paved in 1948 except for the section between the bridge crossing Wildcat Creek and the crossing of an unnamed stream two miles to the north. This remaining portion was paved in 1949.

In August 2007, parts of Highway 26 were washed away by flooding or covered by landslides caused by unusually heavy rains. Between 10–15 inches (25–38 cm) of rain fell over a two-day period.

== Major intersections ==
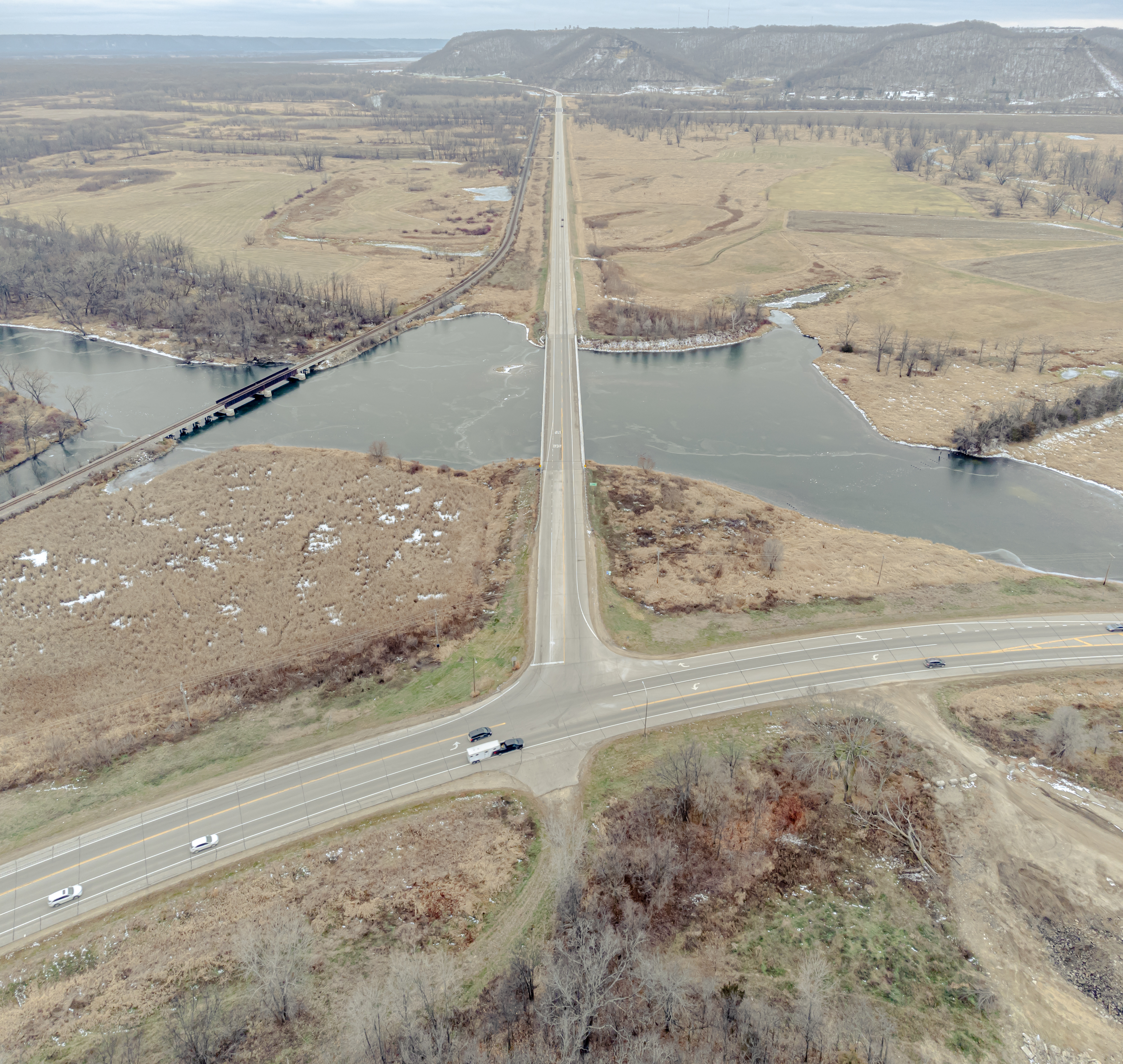
Northern terminus of MN-26 at MN-16 Junction

The entire route is in Houston County.

Location	mi	km	Destinations	Notes
Jefferson Township	0.000	0.000	Iowa 26 south / Great River Road – New Albin	Continuation beyond Iowa state line
Crooked Creek Township	6.234	10.033	CR 249 – Freeburg, Caledonia	Former MN 249
La Crescent Township	21.121	33.991	MN 16 / Great River Road – La Crescent, Hokah	Northern terminus
1.000 mi = 1.609 km; 1.000 km = 0.621 mi
