= Gitchie Manitou State Preserve =

Nature preserve in Lyon County, Iowa

Coordinates: 43.497°N 96.592°W

Gitchie Manitou is a small (91 acre) nature preserve in Lyon County, in the extreme northwestern corner of Iowa just northwest of Granite, Iowa, or just southeast of Sioux Falls, South Dakota. This natural prairie preserve is noted for its ancient Native American burial mounds and precambrian Sioux Quartzite outcroppings, which are about 1.6 billion years old.

== History ==
In 1916, the state of Iowa purchased the first 47.5 acres (192,000 m^{2}) for use as a quarry, but later transferred the area to the Board of Conservation.The area was initially classified as a state park, and later a "preserve." It was formally dedicated as a geological, archaeological, historical, and biological preserve in 1969. The preserve was named for the creator spirit in Anishinaabe Indian tradition, Gichi-Manidoo (literally "Great Spirit" or "Great Force of Nature"). The smooth, pink-colored bedrock is the oldest exposed rock in the state.

== 1973 murder case ==
The preserve was the scene of a 1973 homicide. Four teenagers were killed and a fifth was raped. Three brothers were convicted of the crime and sentenced to life imprisonment.
