= Lyon County, Iowa =

County in Iowa, United States

- County
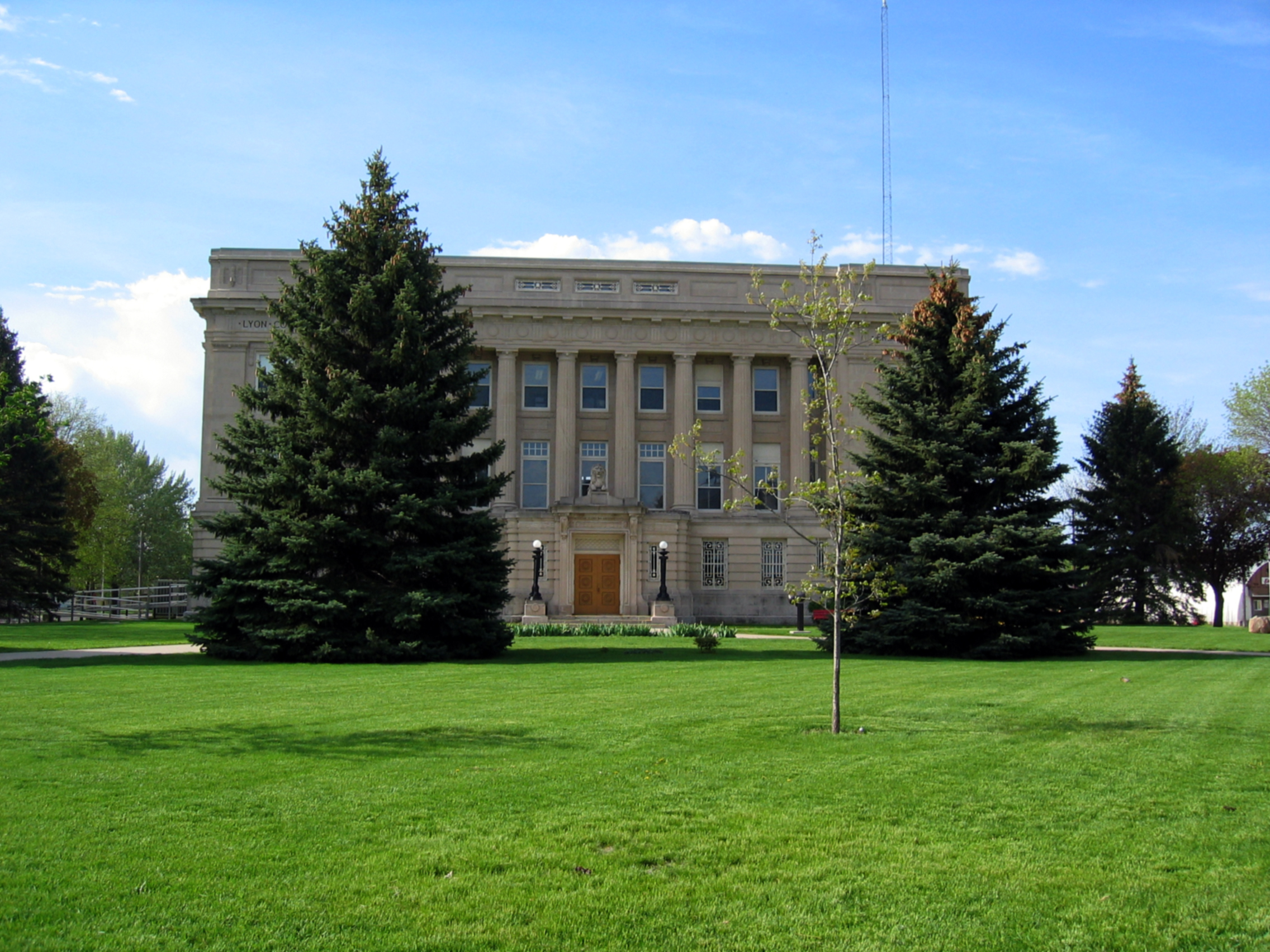
- The Lyon County Courthouse in Rock Rapids

- Seal

- Location within the U.S. state of Iowa
- Coordinates: 43°23′00″N 96°13′00″W
- Country: United States
- State: Iowa
- Founded: January 15, 1851
- Named for: Nathaniel Lyon
- Seat: Rock Rapids
- Largest city: Rock Rapids

Area
  - Total: 588 sq mi (1,520 km^{2})
  - Land: 588 sq mi (1,520 km^{2})
  - Water: 0.1 sq mi (0.26 km^{2}) 0.02%

Population (2020)
  - Total: 11,934
  - Estimate (2025): 12,354 ▲
  - Density: 20.3/sq mi (7.84/km^{2})
- Time zone: UTC−6 (Central)
  - Summer (DST): UTC−5 (CDT)
- Congressional district: 4th
- Website: lyoncounty.iowa.gov
- Iowa county number 60

Lyon County is the most northwestern county of the U.S. state of Iowa. As of the 2020 census, the population was 11,934. The county seat is Rock Rapids.

Lyon County is named in honor of Brigadier General Nathaniel Lyon, who served in the Mexican–American War and the Civil War. He was killed at the Battle of Wilson's Creek, Missouri, on August 10, 1861, after which the county was named for him. The county's name was originally Buncombe County, but was changed by the state legislature on September 11, 1862.

== History ==
The land that makes up Lyon County was ceded to the federal government by the Sioux Native Tribe through a treaty signed on July 23, 1851. The boundaries of the county were set on January 15, 1851, and attached to Woodbury County (then called Wahkaw County) for administration purposes. Lyon County was split from Woodbury County on January 1, 1872.

The first non-indigenous resident to live in Lyon County was Daniel McLaren, known as "Uncle Dan". He lived near the Sioux River for a short time, spending his time hunting and trapping. He moved out of the county early in its settlement to stake a claim further west. The second settler in the area was known as "Old Tom", a hunter and trapper who lived briefly near present-day Rock Rapids. While setting his traps, Old Tom was killed by Sioux tribespeople.

In 1862–1863, a group of men from the east coast spent time in the county on a hunting trip. They were: Roy McGregor, George Clark and Thomas Lockhart. During the winter, Lockhart and McGregor were hunting elk along the Little Rock creek and encountered a group of Sioux tribespeople. Lockhart was killed by an arrow, but McGregor was able to escape and rejoin Clark. The two continued to hunt and trap until March 1863. During a spring flood, Clark was drowned and McGregor decided to move back east.

The first permanent settlement in Lyon County was built by Lewis P. Hyde in July 1866. The county's population reached 100 persons in 1869, entirely through migration and settlement. The first non-indigenous child born in the county was Odena Lee, born on May 28, 1871. The first election in the county was held on October 10, 1871, and recorded 97 votes.

== Geography ==
According to the United States Census Bureau, the county has a total area of 588 square miles (1,520 km^{2}), of which 588 square miles (1,520 km^{2}) is land and 0.1 square miles (0.26 km^{2}) (0.02%) is water.

Lyon County is the location of Gitchie Manitou State Preserve, which contains some of the oldest exposed bedrock in the country.

Lake Pahoja is located in the northwest part of the county. It is a man-made lake with an area of just over 28 hectares (69 acres).

=== Major highways ===
- U.S. Highway 18
- U.S. Highway 75
- Iowa Highway 9
- Iowa Highway 182

=== Adjacent counties ===
- Rock County, Minnesota (north)
- Nobles County, Minnesota (northeast)
- Osceola County (east)
- Sioux County (south)
- Lincoln County, South Dakota (west)
- Minnehaha County, South Dakota (northwest)

== Demographics ==
Historical population
| Census | Pop. | Note | %± |
|---|---|---|---|
| 1870 | 221 | | — |
| 1880 | 1,968 | | 790.5% |
| 1890 | 8,680 | | 341.1% |
| 1900 | 13,165 | | 51.7% |
| 1910 | 14,624 | | 11.1% |
| 1920 | 15,431 | | 5.5% |
| 1930 | 15,293 | | −0.9% |
| 1940 | 15,374 | | 0.5% |
| 1950 | 14,697 | | −4.4% |
| 1960 | 14,468 | | −1.6% |
| 1970 | 13,340 | | −7.8% |
| 1980 | 12,896 | | −3.3% |
| 1990 | 11,952 | | −7.3% |
| 2000 | 11,763 | | −1.6% |
| 2010 | 11,581 | | −1.5% |
| 2020 | 11,934 | | 3.0% |
| 2025 (est.) | 12,354 | ▲ | 3.5% |
U.S. Decennial Census; 1790–1960 1900–1990; 1990–2000 2010–2020

=== 2020 census ===
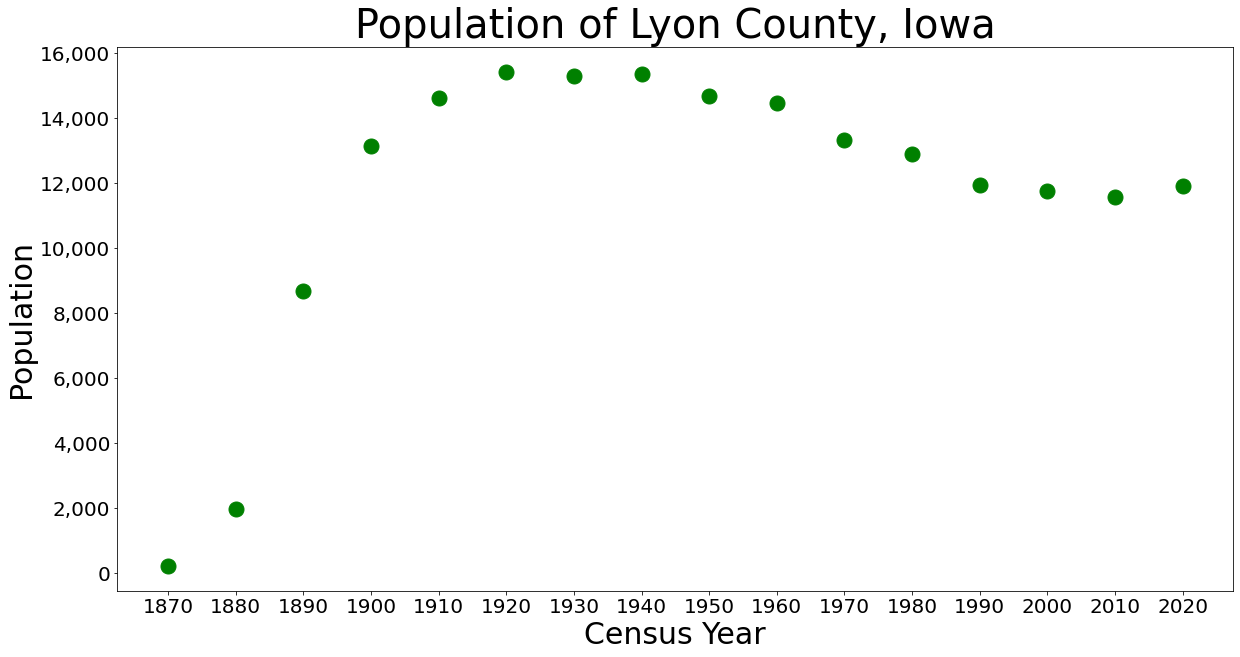
Population of Lyon County from the U.S. census data

As of the 2020 census, the county had a population of 11,934 with a population density of 20.3/sq mi (7.9/km^{2}). The median age was 37.7 years, 28.9% of residents were under the age of 18, and 18.4% were 65 years of age or older. For every 100 females there were 103.4 males, and for every 100 females age 18 and over there were 100.7 males age 18 and over.

The county reported 97.19% of residents as a single race: 94.4% were White, 0.3% were Black or African American, 0.3% were American Indian and Alaska Native, 0.2% were Asian, 0.4% were Native Hawaiian and Pacific Islander, 1.6% were some other race, and 2.8% were two or more races; Hispanic or Latino residents of any race comprised 3.4% of the population.

<0.1% of residents lived in urban areas, while 100.0% lived in rural areas.

There were 4,466 households in the county, of which 33.0% had children under the age of 18 living in them. Of all households, 61.8% were married-couple households, 16.8% were households with a male householder and no spouse or partner present, and 17.8% were households with a female householder and no spouse or partner present. About 25.9% of all households were made up of individuals and 12.5% had someone living alone who was 65 years of age or older.

There were 4,817 housing units, of which 4,466 were occupied; 7.3% of the units were vacant. Among occupied units, 82.6% were owner-occupied and 17.4% were renter-occupied. The homeowner vacancy rate was 1.5% and the rental vacancy rate was 7.1%.

=== 2010 census ===
The 2010 census recorded a population of 11,581 in the county, with a population density of 19.7/sq mi (7.6/km^{2}). There were 4,848 housing units, of which 4,442 were occupied.

=== 2000 census ===
As of the 2000 census, there were 11,763 people, 4,428 households, and 3,263 families residing in the county. The population density was 20 people per square mile (7.7 people/km^{2}). There were 4,758 housing units at an average density of 8 units per square mile (3.1 units/km^{2}). The racial makeup of the county was 99.13% White, 0.09% Black or African American, 0.14% Native American, 0.15% Asian, 0.01% Pacific Islander, 0.10% from other races, and 0.37% from two or more races. 0.36% of the population were Hispanic or Latino of any race.

There were 4,428 households, out of which 34.80% had children under the age of 18 living with them, 67.10% were married couples living together, 4.40% had a female householder with no husband present, and 26.30% were non-families. 24.30% of all households were made up of individuals, and 13.70% had someone living alone who was 65 years of age or older. The average household size was 2.61 and the average family size was 3.13.

In the county, the population was spread out, with 28.00% under the age of 18, 7.60% from 18 to 24, 24.60% from 25 to 44, 20.90% from 45 to 64, and 18.80% who were 65 years of age or older. The median age was 38 years. For every 100 females there were 98.40 males. For every 100 females age 18 and over, there were 94.60 males.

The median income for a household in the county was $36,878, and the median income for a family was $45,144. Males had a median income of $29,462 versus $19,385 for females. The per capita income for the county was $16,081. About 4.90% of families and 7.00% of the population were below the poverty line, including 7.90% of those under age 18 and 10.30% of those age 65 or over.

== Communities ==
=== Cities ===
- Alvord
- Doon
- George
- Inwood
- Larchwood
- Lester
- Little Rock
- Rock Rapids

=== Unincorporated communities ===
- Beloit
- Edna
- Granite
- Klondike

=== Townships ===
- Allison
- Centennial
- Cleveland
- Dale
- Doon
- Elgin
- Garfield
- Grant
- Larchwood
- Liberal
- Logan
- Lyon
- Midland
- Richland
- Riverside
- Rock
- Sioux
- Wheeler

=== Population ranking ===
The population ranking of the following table is based on the 2020 census of Lyon County.

† county seat

| Rank | City/Town/etc. | Municipal type | Population (2020 Census) |
|---|---|---|---|
| 1 | † Rock Rapids | City | 2,611 |
| 2 | George | City | 1,077 |
| 3 | Inwood | City | 928 |
| 4 | Larchwood | City | 926 |
| 5 | Doon | City | 619 |
| 6 | Little Rock | City | 439 |
| 7 | Lester | City | 296 |
| 8 | Alvord | City | 206 |

== Politics ==
Lyon County is among the most GOP-friendly counties in Iowa. Only two Democrats have ever won the county: Grover Cleveland by a twenty-vote plurality in 1892, and Franklin D. Roosevelt in his 1932 and 1936 landslides. Though Roosevelt carried the county by a very comfortable margin in both elections, the county went back to its solid Republican roots in 1940 and has not been won by a Democrat since, with Michael Dukakis being the last Democrat to even reach 30%. The only other times someone besides a Republican won this county were in 1912 when Theodore Roosevelt carried it in the split election, and in 1924 when Robert M. La Follette carried it by a narrow plurality. Even so, both of these candidates were affiliated with the Republican Party outside of these elections.

United States presidential election results for Lyon County, Iowa
| Year | Republican | | Democratic | | Third party(ies) | |
| Year | No. | % | No. | % | No. | % |
|---|---|---|---|---|---|---|
| 1896 | 1,568 | 51.33% | 1,464 | 47.92% | 23 | 0.75% |
| 1900 | 1,666 | 55.00% | 1,289 | 42.56% | 74 | 2.44% |
| 1904 | 1,802 | 65.05% | 841 | 30.36% | 127 | 4.58% |
| 1908 | 1,650 | 58.93% | 1,064 | 38.00% | 86 | 3.07% |
| 1912 | 412 | 14.84% | 896 | 32.27% | 1,469 | 52.90% |
| 1916 | 1,760 | 59.78% | 1,137 | 38.62% | 47 | 1.60% |
| 1920 | 3,633 | 81.48% | 729 | 16.35% | 97 | 2.18% |
| 1924 | 2,082 | 43.99% | 481 | 10.16% | 2,170 | 45.85% |
| 1928 | 3,170 | 65.52% | 1,632 | 33.73% | 36 | 0.74% |
| 1932 | 1,684 | 31.79% | 3,543 | 66.89% | 70 | 1.32% |
| 1936 | 2,264 | 38.09% | 3,590 | 60.40% | 90 | 1.51% |
| 1940 | 3,880 | 59.33% | 2,648 | 40.49% | 12 | 0.18% |
| 1944 | 3,065 | 60.79% | 1,970 | 39.07% | 7 | 0.14% |
| 1948 | 2,500 | 52.74% | 2,174 | 45.86% | 66 | 1.39% |
| 1952 | 4,893 | 78.59% | 1,324 | 21.27% | 9 | 0.14% |
| 1956 | 4,356 | 70.83% | 1,790 | 29.11% | 4 | 0.07% |
| 1960 | 4,917 | 73.65% | 1,752 | 26.24% | 7 | 0.10% |
| 1964 | 3,185 | 53.66% | 2,747 | 46.28% | 3 | 0.05% |
| 1968 | 4,195 | 72.91% | 1,403 | 24.38% | 156 | 2.71% |
| 1972 | 3,788 | 72.12% | 1,407 | 26.79% | 57 | 1.09% |
| 1976 | 3,558 | 64.06% | 1,870 | 33.67% | 126 | 2.27% |
| 1980 | 4,349 | 70.05% | 1,431 | 23.05% | 428 | 6.89% |
| 1984 | 4,178 | 74.05% | 1,401 | 24.83% | 63 | 1.12% |
| 1988 | 3,517 | 66.81% | 1,706 | 32.41% | 41 | 0.78% |
| 1992 | 3,272 | 57.14% | 1,331 | 23.24% | 1,123 | 19.61% |
| 1996 | 3,396 | 63.45% | 1,489 | 27.82% | 467 | 8.73% |
| 2000 | 3,918 | 73.34% | 1,313 | 24.58% | 111 | 2.08% |
| 2004 | 4,751 | 77.87% | 1,303 | 21.36% | 47 | 0.77% |
| 2008 | 4,471 | 71.88% | 1,675 | 26.93% | 74 | 1.19% |
| 2012 | 4,978 | 76.48% | 1,423 | 21.86% | 108 | 1.66% |
| 2016 | 5,192 | 81.42% | 920 | 14.43% | 265 | 4.16% |
| 2020 | 5,707 | 83.16% | 1,067 | 15.55% | 89 | 1.30% |
| 2024 | 5,899 | 84.25% | 1,023 | 14.61% | 80 | 1.14% |

== See also ==
- National Register of Historic Places listings in Lyon County, Iowa
- Blood Run Site
