= Logan Township, Lyon County, Iowa =

Township in Lyon County, Iowa, United States

Coordinates: 43°23′N 96°23′W

Logan Township is a township in Lyon County, Iowa, United States.
