= Lester, Iowa =

- City
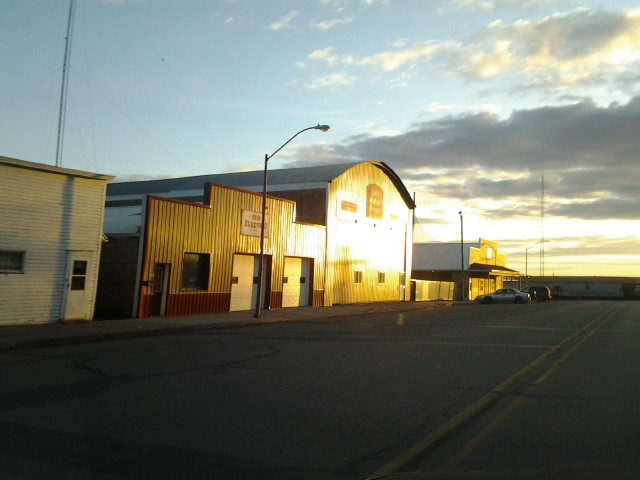
- Lester Iowa Main Street

- Location of Lester, Iowa
- Coordinates: 43°26′25″N 96°19′53″W
- Country: United States
- State: Iowa
- County: Lyon

Government
  - Type: Mayor-council

Area
  - Total: 1.83 sq mi (4.73 km^{2})
  - Land: 1.83 sq mi (4.73 km^{2})
  - Water: 0 sq mi (0.00 km^{2})
- Elevation: 1,411 ft (430 m)

Population (2020)
  - Total: 296
  - Density: 162.2/sq mi (62.63/km^{2})
- Time zone: UTC-6 (Central (CST))
  - Summer (DST): UTC-5 (CDT)
- ZIP code: 51242
- Area code: 712
- FIPS code: 19-44670
- GNIS feature ID: 2395686
- Website: City of Lester

Lester is a city in Lyon County, Iowa, United States. The population was 296 at the time of the 2020 census.

== Geography ==
According to the United States Census Bureau, the city has a total area of 1.82 square miles (4.71 km^{2}), all land.

== Demographics ==
Historical populations
| Year | Pop. | ±% |
|---|---|---|
| 1880 | 31 | — |
| 1890 | 35 | +12.9% |
| 1900 | 225 | +542.9% |
| 1910 | 244 | +8.4% |
| 1920 | 250 | +2.5% |
| 1930 | 231 | −7.6% |
| 1940 | 286 | +23.8% |
| 1950 | 217 | −24.1% |
| 1960 | 239 | +10.1% |
| 1970 | 238 | −0.4% |
| 1980 | 274 | +15.1% |
| 1990 | 257 | −6.2% |
| 2000 | 251 | −2.3% |
| 2010 | 294 | +17.1% |
| 2020 | 296 | +0.7% |
Source:"U.S. Census website". United States Census Bureau. and Iowa Data Center; Source: U.S. Decennial Census

=== 2020 census ===
As of the census of 2020, there were 296 people, 108 households, and 80 families residing in the city. The population density was 162.2 inhabitants per square mile (62.6/km^{2}). There were 116 housing units at an average density of 63.6 per square mile (24.5/km^{2}). The racial makeup of the city was 90.9% White, 0.7% Black or African American, 0.0% Native American, 0.0% Asian, 0.7% Pacific Islander, 5.7% from other races and 2.0% from two or more races. Hispanic or Latino persons of any race comprised 9.8% of the population.

Of the 108 households, 38.0% of which had children under the age of 18 living with them, 64.8% were married couples living together, 1.9% were cohabitating couples, 16.7% had a female householder with no spouse or partner present and 16.7% had a male householder with no spouse or partner present. 25.9% of all households were non-families. 22.2% of all households were made up of individuals, 12.0% had someone living alone who was 65 years old or older.

The median age in the city was 35.3 years. 33.1% of the residents were under the age of 20; 4.7% were between the ages of 20 and 24; 24.7% were from 25 and 44; 19.9% were from 45 and 64; and 17.6% were 65 years of age or older. The gender makeup of the city was 52.0% male and 48.0% female.

=== 2010 census ===
As of the census of 2010, there were 294 people, 109 households, and 80 families living in the city. The population density was 161.5 inhabitants per square mile (62.4/km^{2}). There were 115 housing units at an average density of 63.2 per square mile (24.4/km^{2}). The racial makeup of the city was 93.5% White, 0.3% African American, 0.7% Native American, 0.3% Asian, 4.1% from other races, and 1.0% from two or more races. Hispanic or Latino of any race were 5.4% of the population.

There were 109 households, of which 33.9% had children under the age of 18 living with them, 66.1% were married couples living together, 1.8% had a female householder with no husband present, 5.5% had a male householder with no wife present, and 26.6% were non-families. 24.8% of all households were made up of individuals, and 11.9% had someone living alone who was 65 years of age or older. The average household size was 2.70 and the average family size was 3.26.

The median age in the city was 34 years. 33% of residents were under the age of 18; 6.8% were between the ages of 18 and 24; 22.1% were from 25 to 44; 21.5% were from 45 to 64; and 16.7% were 65 years of age or older. The gender makeup of the city was 48.6% male and 51.4% female.

=== 2000 census ===
As of the census of 2000, there were 251 people, 103 households, and 70 families living in the city. The population density was 138.3 inhabitants per square mile (53.4/km^{2}). There were 110 housing units at an average density of 60.6 per square mile (23.4/km^{2}). The racial makeup of the city was 99.20% White, and 0.80% from two or more races.

There were 103 households, out of which 26.2% had children under the age of 18 living with them, 62.1% were married couples living together, 4.9% had a female householder with no husband present, and 32.0% were non-families. 29.1% of all households were made up of individuals, and 17.5% had someone living alone who was 65 years of age or older. The average household size was 2.44 and the average family size was 3.06.

In the city, the population was spread out, with 21.9% under the age of 18, 14.3% from 18 to 24, 22.3% from 25 to 44, 19.5% from 45 to 64, and 21.9% who were 65 years of age or older. The median age was 39 years. For every 100 females there were 80.6 males. For every 100 females age 18 and over, there were 84.9 males.

The median income for a household in the city was $38,750, and the median income for a family was $47,083. Males had a median income of $27,083 versus $20,938 for females. The per capita income for the city was $17,410. About 3.1% of families and 4.3% of the population were below the poverty line, including none of those under the age of eighteen or sixty five or over.
