= Inwood, Iowa =

- City
- Logo
- Motto: "The city of friendly people"
- Location of Inwood, Iowa
- Coordinates: 43°18′33″N 96°26′04″W
- Country: United States
- State: Iowa
- County: Lyon

Area
  - Total: 1.42 sq mi (3.67 km^{2})
  - Land: 1.42 sq mi (3.67 km^{2})
  - Water: 0 sq mi (0.00 km^{2})
- Elevation: 1,467 ft (447 m)

Population (2020)
  - Total: 928
  - Density: 654.9/sq mi (252.87/km^{2})
- Time zone: UTC-6 (Central (CST))
  - Summer (DST): UTC-5 (CDT)
- ZIP code: 51240
- Area code: 712
- FIPS code: 19-38415
- GNIS feature ID: 2395430
- Website: City of Inwood

Inwood is a city in Lyon County, Iowa, United States. The population was 928 at the time of the 2020 census.

== Geography ==
According to the United States Census Bureau, the city has an area of 1.34 square miles (3.47 km^{2}), all land.

== Demographics ==
Historical populations
Year	Pop.	±%
1900	477	—
1910	595	+24.7%
1920	746	+25.4%
1930	670	−10.2%
1940	634	−5.4%
1950	644	+1.6%
1960	638	−0.9%
1970	644	+0.9%
1980	755	+17.2%
1990	824	+9.1%
2000	875	+6.2%
2010	814	−7.0%
2020	928	+14.0%
Source:"U.S. Census website". United States Census Bureau. and Iowa Data Center; Source: U.S. Decennial Census

=== 2020 census ===
As of the census of 2020, there were 928 people, 348 households, and 230 families residing in the city. The population density was 654.9 inhabitants per square mile (252.9/km^{2}). There were 374 housing units at an average density of 264.0 per square mile (101.9/km^{2}). The racial makeup of the city was 93.4% White, 0.1% Black or African American, 0.2% Native American, 0.2% Asian, 0.0% Pacific Islander, 4.3% from other races and 1.7% from two or more races. Hispanic or Latino persons of any race comprised 7.3% of the population.

Of the 348 households, 37.9% of which had children under the age of 18 living with them, 55.2% were married couples living together, 4.6% were cohabitating couples, 21.0% had a female householder with no spouse or partner present and 19.3% had a male householder with no spouse or partner present. 33.9% of all households were non-families. 29.6% of all households were made up of individuals, 14.9% had someone living alone who was 65 years old or older.

The median age in the city was 35.4 years. 31.7% of the residents were under the age of 20; 5.8% were between the ages of 20 and 24; 24.5% were from 25 and 44; 17.0% were from 45 and 64; and 21.0% were 65 years of age or older. The gender makeup of the city was 49.1% male and 50.9% female.

=== 2010 census ===
As of the census of 2010, there were 814 people, 341 households, and 236 families living in the city. The population density was 607.5 inhabitants per square mile (234.6/km^{2}). There were 373 housing units at an average density of 278.4 per square mile (107.5/km^{2}). The racial makeup of the city was 97.9% White, 0.1% Native American, 0.1% Asian, 1.2% from other races, and 0.6% from two or more races. Hispanic or Latino of any race were 1.4% of the population.

There were 341 households, of which 27.3% had children under the age of 18 living with them, 61.9% were married couples living together, 4.1% had a female householder with no husband present, 3.2% had a male householder with no wife present, and 30.8% were non-families. 27.3% of all households were made up of individuals, and 15% had someone living alone who was 65 years of age or older. The average household size was 2.29 and the average family size was 2.75.

The median age in the city was 41.3 years. 21.9% of residents were under the age of 18; 7.6% were between the ages of 18 and 24; 22.9% were from 25 to 44; 22.9% were from 45 to 64; and 24.7% were 65 years of age or older. The gender makeup of the city was 49.0% male and 51.0% female.

=== 2000 census ===
As of the census of 2000, there were 875 people, 334 households, and 234 families living in the city. The population density was 658.0 inhabitants per square mile (254.1/km^{2}). There were 365 housing units at an average density of 274.5 per square mile (106.0/km^{2}). The racial makeup of the city was 97.26% White, 0.46% African American, 0.11% Native American, 0.11% Asian, 1.03% from other races, and 1.03% from two or more races. Hispanic or Latino of any race were 1.83% of the population.

There were 334 households, out of which 32.6% had children under the age of 18 living with them, 63.5% were married couples living together, 5.4% had a female householder with no husband present, and 29.9% were non-families. 29.0% of all households were made up of individuals, and 18.3% had someone living alone who was 65 years of age or older. The average household size was 2.48 and the average family size was 3.07.

In the city, the population was spread out, with 26.4% under the age of 18, 7.5% from 18 to 24, 23.5% from 25 to 44, 16.8% from 45 to 64, and 25.7% who were 65 years of age or older. The median age was 40 years. For every 100 females, there were 84.2 males. For every 100 females age 18 and over, there were 84.0 males.

The median income for a household in the city was $33,889, and the median income for a family was $41,667. Males had a median income of $29,408 versus $23,611 for females. The per capita income for the city was $15,651. About 6.8% of families and 7.9% of the population were below the poverty line, including 8.5% of those under age 18 and 7.6% of those age 65 or over.

== Notable people ==
- Robert A. Dahl, (1915-2014) political scientist and Sterling professor at Yale.
- Kyle Vanden Bosch (1978– ) defensive end for the Detroit Lions
