= Larchwood, Iowa =

- City
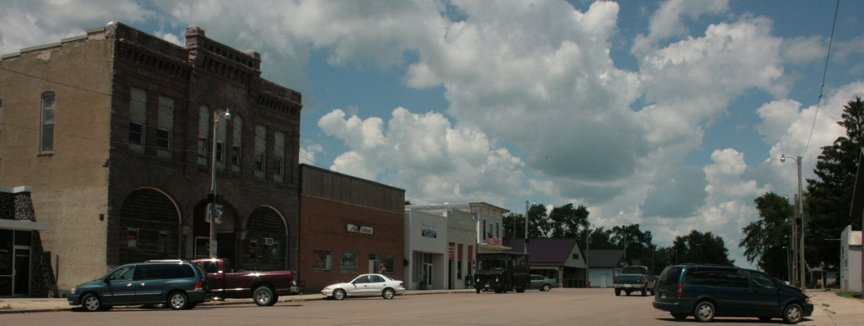
- Street scene in Larchwood

- Location of Larchwood, Iowa
- Coordinates: 43°27′17″N 96°26′11″W
- Country: US
- State: Iowa
- County: Lyon

Area
  - Total: 1.04 sq mi (2.69 km^{2})
  - Land: 1.04 sq mi (2.69 km^{2})
  - Water: 0 sq mi (0.00 km^{2})
- Elevation: 1,467 ft (447 m)

Population (2020)
  - Total: 926
  - Density: 893.2/sq mi (344.85/km^{2})
- Time zone: UTC-6 (Central (CST))
  - Summer (DST): UTC-5 (CDT)
- ZIP code: 51241
- Area code: 712
- FIPS code: 19-43410
- GNIS feature ID: 2395633
- Website: citylarchwood.frontdeskgworks.com

Larchwood is a city in Lyon County, Iowa, United States. The population was 926 at the time of the 2020 census.

== History ==
Larchwood was founded circa 1872 by a group of McLean County, Illinois land developers: Jesse W. Fell (10 November 1808 – 25 February 1887) and Charles W. Holder (25 September 1819 – 10 April 1900). Fell was born in Pennsylvania, had settled in Bloomington, Illinois, in 1831 and had played an active role in founding many Illinois towns, including Clinton, Normal, Pontiac, and Towanda. He was a close friend of Abraham Lincoln, and with his brother Kersey Fell had persuaded Lincoln to write his famous autography. He was nationally known for his love of trees. Holder was a partner in many of Fell's projects, including Towanda and Normal. Holder, Illinois was named in his honor. In the summer of 1869, Fell traveled to northwestern Iowa and selected a tract of about forty sections, more than 25,000 acres (100 km^{2}) of land. Fell wrote, “I have never beheld such a large body of surpassingly beautiful prairie as is here to be found. There is absolutely no waste of land, and scarce a quarter of a section not affording an admirable building site.” Holder then entered the land. Larchwood was established at the center of their holdings. Fell frequently visited the site and in May 1873 and personally supervised the planting of some 100,000 saplings and tree cuttings. The town did not grow as rapidly as expected, and in 1881 the development was sold to an Englishman, Richard Sykes.

== Geography ==
Larchwood is the northwesternmost community in Iowa and the most distant from the capitol, Des Moines.

According to the United States Census Bureau, the city has a total area of 0.99 square miles (2.56 km^{2}), all land.

== Demographics ==
Historical populations
Year	Pop.	±%
1900	450	—
1910	434	−3.6%
1920	441	+1.6%
1930	382	−13.4%
1940	405	+6.0%
1950	415	+2.5%
1960	531	+28.0%
1970	611	+15.1%
1980	701	+14.7%
1990	739	+5.4%
2000	788	+6.6%
2010	866	+9.9%
2020	926	+6.9%
Source:"U.S. Census website". United States Census Bureau. and Iowa Data Center; Source: U.S. Decennial Census

=== 2020 census ===
As of the census of 2020, there were 926 people, 391 households, and 252 families residing in the city. The population density was 893.2 inhabitants per square mile (344.9/km^{2}). There were 409 housing units at an average density of 394.5 per square mile (152.3/km^{2}). The racial makeup of the city was 94.8% White, 0.4% Black or African American, 0.5% Native American, 0.3% Asian, 0.0% Pacific Islander, 0.4% from other races and 3.5% from two or more races. Hispanic or Latino persons of any race comprised 2.4% of the population.

Of the 391 households, 27.6% of which had children under the age of 18 living with them, 52.4% were married couples living together, 5.6% were cohabitating couples, 22.8% had a female householder with no spouse or partner present and 19.2% had a male householder with no spouse or partner present. 35.5% of all households were non-families. 30.2% of all households were made up of individuals, 11.5% had someone living alone who was 65 years old or older.

The median age in the city was 39.7 years. 28.0% of the residents were under the age of 20; 3.8% were between the ages of 20 and 24; 26.3% were from 25 and 44; 23.0% were from 45 and 64; and 18.9% were 65 years of age or older. The gender makeup of the city was 50.3% male and 49.7% female.

=== 2010 census ===
As of the census of 2010, there were 866 people, 353 households, and 257 families residing in the city. The population density was 874.7 inhabitants per square mile (337.7/km^{2}). There were 372 housing units at an average density of 375.8 per square mile (145.1/km^{2}). The racial makeup of the city was 98.6% White, 0.1% Native American, 0.2% Asian, 0.5% from other races, and 0.6% from two or more races. Hispanic or Latino of any race were 1.2% of the population.

There were 353 households, of which 36.5% had children under the age of 18 living with them, 59.2% were married couples living together, 9.9% had a female householder with no husband present, 3.7% had a male householder with no wife present, and 27.2% were non-families. 25.5% of all households were made up of individuals, and 12.5% had someone living alone who was 65 years of age or older. The average household size was 2.45 and the average family size was 2.94.

The median age in the city was 34.8 years. 28.3% of residents were under the age of 18; 5.5% were between the ages of 18 and 24; 27.8% were from 25 to 44; 23.1% were from 45 to 64; and 15.2% were 65 years of age or older. The gender makeup of the city was 48.4% male and 51.6% female.

=== 2000 census ===
As of the census of 2000, there were 788 people, 326 households, and 234 families residing in the city. The population density was 812.1 inhabitants per square mile (313.6/km^{2}). There were 344 housing units at an average density of 354.5 per square mile (136.9/km^{2}). The racial makeup of the city was 98.60% White, 0.13% Native American, 0.51% Asian, and 0.76% from two or more races.

There were 326 households, out of which 33.7% had children under the age of 18 living with them, 62.6% were married couples living together, 5.8% had a female householder with no husband present, and 28.2% were non-families. 26.4% of all households were made up of individuals, and 15.3% had someone living alone who was 65 years of age or older. The average household size was 2.41 and the average family size was 2.91.

In the city, the population was spread out, with 24.2% under the age of 18, 10.0% from 18 to 24, 26.5% from 25 to 44, 20.6% from 45 to 64, and 18.7% who were 65 years of age or older. The median age was 38 years. For every 100 females, there were 95.0 males. For every 100 females age 18 and over, there were 92.6 males.

The median income for a household in the city was $42,250, and the median income for a family was $48,125. Males had a median income of $30,938 versus $21,164 for females. The per capita income for the city was $21,092. About 0.8% of families and 2.0% of the population were below the poverty line, including 0.5% of those under age 18 and 8.6% of those age 65 or over.

== Education ==
Larchwood belongs to the West Lyon Community School District, which also serves students from the nearby towns of Lester, Alvord, and Inwood, as well as the many rural children from farming families.

== Casino ==
The Grand Falls Casino Resort is located along the South Dakota border, northwest of Larchwood. The casino opened for business June 9, 2011. The casino resort was developed by Kehl Management Company. Along with the casino there is a 97-room hotel. An 18-hole golf course is expected to be completed in the summer of 2014.

== Notable people ==
- E. Y. Berry (1902–1999), U.S. representative from South Dakota
- Cheri Blauwet (born 1980), Paralympic wheelchair racer
- Kyle Vanden Bosch (born 1978), defensive end for the Detroit Lions
- LeVar Woods (born 1978), professional football player
