= John Bessler =

American attorney and academic (born 1967)

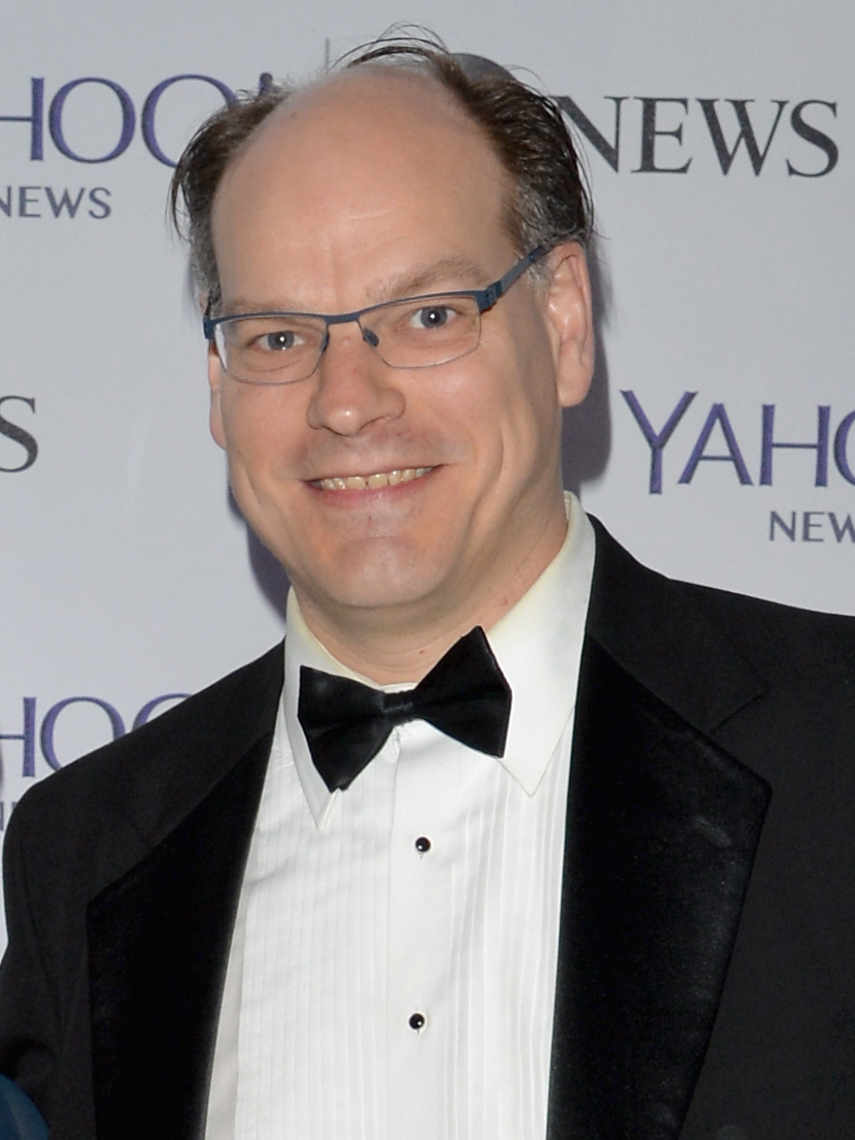
- Bessler in 2014

First Gentleman-designate of Minnesota
- Assuming office January 4, 2027
- Governor: Amy Klobuchar (elect)
- Succeeding: Gwen Walz (as First Lady)

Personal details
- Born: John David Bessler; October 23, 1967 (age 59) Mankato, Minnesota
- Spouse: Amy Klobuchar (m. 1993)
- Children: 1
- Education: University of Minnesota (BA); Indiana University, Bloomington (JD); Hamline University (MFA); University of Oxford (MSt)
- Occupation: Attorney; educator
- Website: University profile

John David Bessler (born October 23, 1967) is an American attorney and academic. He is a professor of law at the University of Baltimore School of Law and an adjunct professor at the Georgetown University Law Center. He is the husband of governor-elect of Minnesota Amy Klobuchar.

== Background ==
Bessler was born in 1967. He attended Loyola Catholic School in Mankato, Minnesota, and received his B.A. in political science from the University of Minnesota, J.D. from Indiana University Maurer School of Law, M.F.A. in creative writing from Hamline University and his M.St. in international human rights law from Oxford University. Bessler studied international human rights law at Oxford University and wrote articles for the Indiana Law Journal and the Arkansas Law Review.

== Legal career ==
Bessler previously taught at the University of Minnesota Law School and The George Washington University Law School, where he specialized in death penalty issues. In addition, Bessler clerked for U.S. Magistrate Judge John M. Mason of the District of Minnesota and practiced law as a partner at Kelly & Berens, P.A. Bessler currently is a tenured associate professor at the University of Baltimore School of Law, where he teaches civil procedure, contracts, capital punishment, international human rights law, and lawyering skills.

=== Writing ===
Bessler is the author of Writing for Life: The Craft of Writing for Everyday Life. His 2014 book The Birth of American Law: An Italian Philosopher and the American Revolution (Carolina Academic Press, 2014) discusses the influence of the Italian jurist and philosopher Cesare Beccaria on the founders of the United States.

==== Capital punishment ====
Bessler is a leading authority on capital punishment, having written five books and various book chapters and articles on the subject. Two of his books on the subject, Death in the Dark: Midnight Executions in America and Legacy of Violence: Lynch Mobs and Executions in Minnesota, were Minnesota Book Award finalists. He has written that the death penalty, even independent of actual executions, is intrinsically a form of torture, arguing that each element of a capital case constitutes a death threat, from charging an individual with a capital crime to the promise of an imminent execution for a condemned person.

Bessler also has contributed to one event, a teleforum entitled "Execution Methods and Deciding Implementation of the Death Penalty," held by The Federalist Society, a conservative and libertarian organization.

== Personal life ==
Bessler is married to Amy Klobuchar, a politician and lawyer who currently serves as a U.S. Senator for Minnesota, and is now the governor-elect. They have a daughter. On March 23, 2020, Klobuchar announced via Instagram that Bessler had contracted COVID-19 and was later hospitalized.

== Bibliography ==
- — (1997). Death in the Dark: Midnight Executions in America. Northeastern University Press. ISBN 978-1555533229.
- — (2003). Kiss of Death: America's Love Affair with the Death Penalty. Northeastern University Press. ISBN 978-1555535674.
- — (2003). Legacy Of Violence: Lynch Mobs And Executions In Minnesota. University of Minnesota Press. ISBN 978-0816638116.
- — (2007). Writing for Life: The Craft of Writing for Everyday Living. Bottlecap Books. ISBN 978-0979271809.
- — (2012). Cruel and Unusual: The American Death Penalty and the Founders' Eighth Amendment. Northeastern University Press. ISBN 978-1555537166.
- — (2014). The Birth of American Law: An Italian Philosopher and the American Revolution. Carolina Academic Press. ISBN 978-1611636048.
- Breyer, Stephen (2016). Bessler, John (ed.). Against the Death Penalty. Brookings Institution Press. ISBN 978-0815728894.
- — (2017). The Death Penalty as Torture: From the Dark Ages to Abolition. Carolina Academic Press. ISBN 978-1611639261.
- — (2018). The Celebrated Marquis: An Italian Noble and the Making of the Modern World. Carolina Academic Press. ISBN 978-1611637861.
- — (2019). The Baron and the Marquis: Liberty, Tyranny, and the Enlightenment Maxim That Can Remake American Criminal Justice. Carolina Academic Press. ISBN 978-1531013059.
- — (2022). The Death Penalty's Denial of Fundamental Human Rights: International Law, State Practice, and the Emerging Abolitionist Norm. Cambridge University Press. ISBN 978-1108845571.
- — (2023). Private Prosecution in America: Its Origins, History, and Unconstitutionality in the Twenty-First Century. Carolina Academic Press. ISBN 978-1531020064.

== Notes ==
Honorary titles
Preceded by Gwen Walz as First Lady of Minnesota	First Gentleman of Minnesota; Taking role 2027	Designate
