= List of people from Silver Spring, Maryland =

This is a list of people who were born in, lived in, or are closely associated with the city of Silver Spring, Maryland.

== Notable people ==
=== Athletics ===
- Elijah Amo (born 1999), soccer player, Maryland Bobcats FC
- Brady Anderson (born 1964), former Major League Baseball player
- Charles Arndt (born 1967), soccer player and coach
- Akil Baddoo (born 1998), Major League Baseball player
- Alex Bazzie (born 1990), former Canadian Football League football player
- Bryant Crawford (born 1997), basketball player in the Israeli Basketball Premier League
- Marc Davis (born 1990), former NASCAR driver
- Dominique Dawes (born 1976), former gymnast and four-time Olympic medalist
- Beatie Deutsch (born 1989), American-Israeli marathon runner
- Isaiah Eisendorf (1996), American-Israeli basketball player in the Israeli Basketball Premier League
- David Feldberg (born 1977), professional disc golfer
- Steve Francis, (born 1977) former NBA basketball player
- Jerian Grant (born 1992), former professional basketball player
- Josh Hart (born 1995), NBA basketball player
- Frank Jackson (born 1998), NBA player
- Matt Maloney (born 1971), former NBA basketball player
- Michelle M. Marciniak (born 1973), former WNBA professional basketball player and assistant coach, South Carolina Gamecocks women's basketball
- Roger Mason Jr. (born 1980), former NBA basketball player
- Joey Mbu (born 1993), former NFL football player
- Victor Oladipo (born 1992), former professional basketball player
- Midge Purce (born 1995), soccer player
- Harold Solomon (born 1952), former tennis player, ranked #5 in the world in singles

=== Arts & entertainment ===
- Martin Amini, stand-up comedian and founder, Room 808
- Jonathan Banks (born 1947), actor
- Carl Bernstein (born 1944), journalist and author
- Keter Betts (1928–2005), musician
- Lewis Black (born 1948), comedian
- Brandon Broady (born 1986), comedian and television host
- Bill Callahan (born 1966), musician
- Rachel Carson (1907–1964), author, Silent Spring
- Crystal Chappell (born 1965), actress
- Dave Chappelle (born 1973), comedian
- Connie Chung (born 1946), news presenter
- Gaelan Connel (born 1989), actor and musician
- Tommy Davidson (born 1963), comedian, actor
- Cara DeLizia (born 1984), actress
- Matt Drudge (born 1966), internet news editor
- Michael Ealy (born 1973), actor
- Neil Fallon (born 1971), lead singer, Clutch
- Wayne Federman (born 1959), comedian, actor, and writer
- Martin Felsen (born 1968), architect
- Jason Freeny (born 1970), sculptor and toy designer
- Kimmy Gatewood, actress, writer, and singer
- Emily Gould (born 1981), author
- Elizabeth Hargrave (resident), game designer
- Muriel Hasbun Salvadoran-American photographer
- Goldie Hawn (born 1945), actress, dancer, producer, and singer
- Keith Howland (born 1964), musician, Chicago
- Rian Johnson (born 1973), film director
- Rick Leventhal (born 1960), journalist
- Elliot Levine (born 1963), musician, Heatwave
- Jesse Mockrin (born 1981), artist
- Oddisee (born 1985), rapper
- George Pelecanos (born 1957), author
- Gretchen Quie (1927–2015), artist and former First Lady of Minnesota
- J. Robbins (born 1967), musician, Jawbox and Office of Future Plans
- Nora Roberts (born 1950), novelist
- David Silverman (born 1957), animator and director, The Simpsons
- Norman Solomon (born 1951), journalist, political candidate
- Ben Stein (born 1944), commentator, humorist, and actor
- Rebecca Sugar (born 1987), artist, composer, and director
- Daryush Valizadeh (born 1979), neomasculinity writer
- Thalia Zedek (born 1961), musician, Live Skull and Come

=== Military, politics, & public service ===
- Laphonza Butler (born 1979), former U.S. senator
- John Meredith Ford (1923–1995), mayor of Georgetown, Guyana
- Humayun Khan (1976–2004), U.S. Army officer and posthumous Purple Heart and Bronze Star Medal recipient
- Dov Lipman (born 1971), member, Israeli Knesset
- Al Quie (1923–2023), former governor of Minnesota

=== Other ===
- Chuck Davidson (born 1961), rabbi
- Charles Fefferman (born 1949), mathematician
- Daniel Snyder (born 1964), businessperson and former owner, Washington Commanders
