= Minnesota State Highway 139 =

State highway in Minnesota, United States

Trunk Highway 139
- MN 139 highlighted in red

Route information
- Maintained by MnDOT
- Length: 3.913 mi (6.297 km)
- Existed: April 22, 1933–present

Major junctions
- South end: Iowa 139 at the Iowa state line near Harmony
- North end: US 52 at Harmony

Location
- Country: United States
- State: Minnesota
- Counties: Fillmore

Highway system
- Minnesota Trunk Highway System; Interstate; US; State; Legislative; Scenic
← MN 135	→ MN 149

Minnesota State Highway 139 (MN 139) is a 3.913-mile-long (6.297 km) highway in southeast Minnesota, which runs from Iowa Highway 139 at the Iowa state line and continues north to its northern terminus at its intersection with U.S. Highway 52 in Harmony.

Highway 139 passes through the city of Harmony and Harmony Township.

== Route description ==
Highway 139 serves as a north–south route between the Iowa state line and the city of Harmony. It is also known as Main Avenue in Harmony.

The route passes near Niagara Cave.

The route is legally defined as Route 79 in the Minnesota Statutes. It is not marked with this number.

== History ==
Highway 139 was authorized in 1933.

The route was paved by 1953.

Highway 139 was numbered to match adjoining Iowa Highway 139. This is the only example where Minnesota numbered a route to match an existing route in Iowa, rather than the opposite. Iowa renumbered its state highways that crossed into Minnesota in the early 1960s to match the Minnesota numbers.

== Major intersections ==
The entire route is in Fillmore County.

Location	mi	km	Destinations	Notes
Harmony Township	0.000	0.000	Iowa 139	Continuation beyond Iowa state line
Harmony	3.044	4.899	CSAH 44	Formerly MN 44 west
Harmony	3.961	6.375	US 52 (Laura Ingalls Wilder Historic Highway) – Preston, Canton	
1.000 mi = 1.609 km; 1.000 km = 0.621 mi
