= Minnetonka, Minnesota =

City in Minnesota, United States

- City
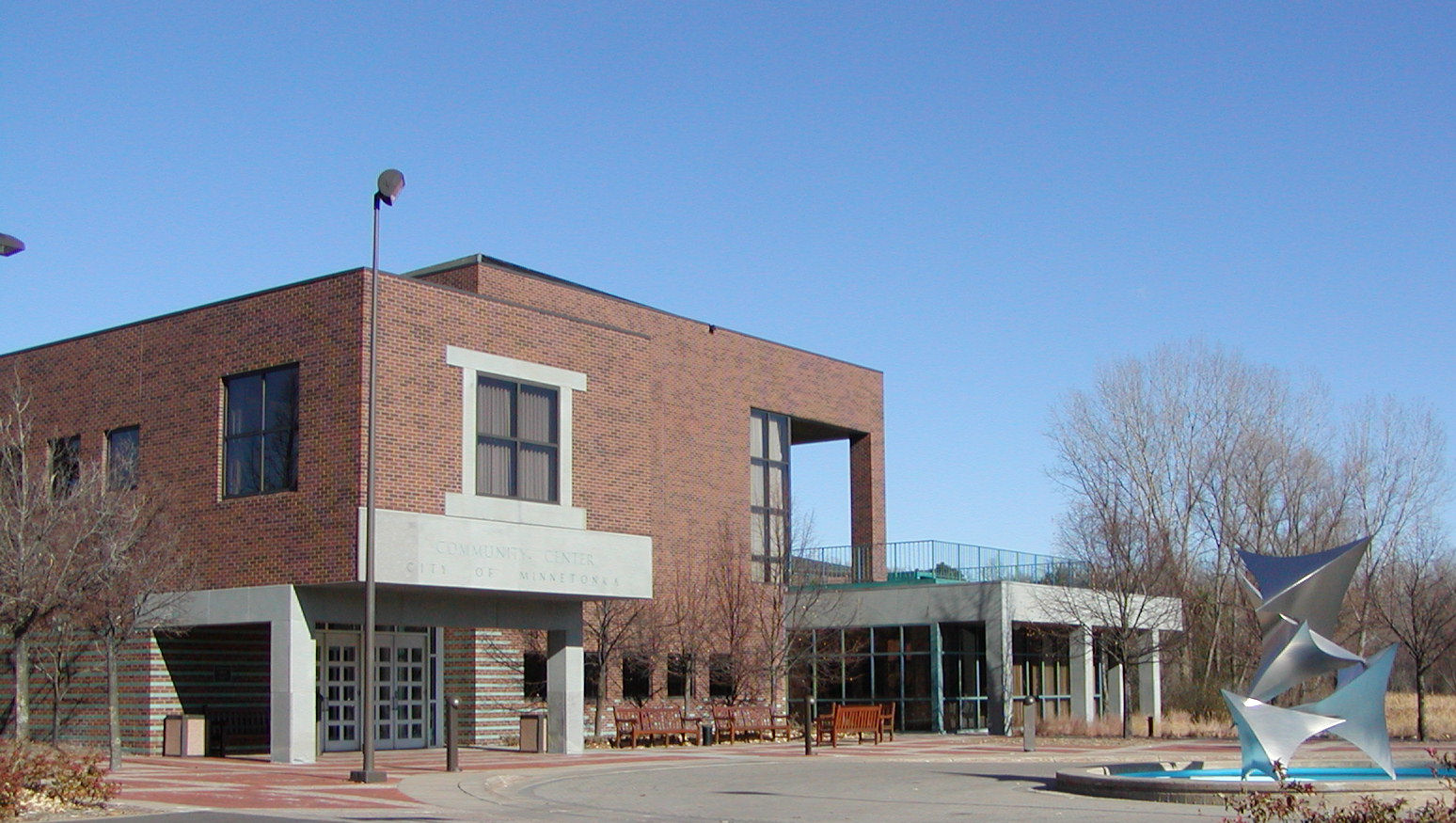
- Minnetonka Community Center

- Icon

- Location of Minnetonka within Hennepin County, Minnesota
- Coordinates: 44°54′48″N 93°30′12″W
- Country: United States
- State: Minnesota
- County: Hennepin
- Founded: 1852
- Incorporated: 1956

Government
  - Mayor: Rebecca Schack

Area
  - City: 27.95 sq mi (72.39 km^{2})
  - Land: 26.92 sq mi (69.71 km^{2})
  - Water: 1.04 sq mi (2.69 km^{2})
- Elevation: 889 ft (271 m)

Population (2020)
  - City: 53,781
  - Estimate (2022): 52,544
  - Rank: US: 761st MN: 18th
  - Density: 1,998.3/sq mi (771.55/km^{2})
  - Metro: 3,693,729 (US: 16th)
- Time zone: UTC-6 (Central)
  - Summer (DST): UTC-5 (CDT)
- ZIP codes: 55305, 55343, 55345, 55391
- Area code: 952
- FIPS code: 27-43252
- GNIS feature ID: 0647949
- Website: www.minnetonkamn.gov

Minnetonka (/ˌmɪnəˈtɒŋkə/ MIN-ə-TONG-kə) is a city in Hennepin County, Minnesota, United States. A western suburb of the Twin Cities, Minnetonka is located about 10 miles (16 km) west of Minneapolis, on the eastern side of Lake Minnetonka. At the 2024 census, the city's population was 52,651.

Minnetonka is the home of Cargill, the country's largest privately owned company, and UnitedHealth Group, the state's largest publicly owned company. I-494 runs through the city while I-394/US 12 and US 169 are situated along the suburb's northern and eastern boundaries respectively.

== History ==
Since the mid-19th century, Minnetonka has evolved from heavily wooded wilderness through extensive farming and industrialization to its present primarily residential suburban character. The Minnetonka area was home to the Dakota before Euro-Americans arrived in the 1800s. They believed Lake Minnetonka (mni meaning water, and tanka meaning big, anglicized to Minnetonka) and the land around it to be sacred.

The first recorded exploration of the area by Euro-Americans was in 1822, when a group from newly constructed Fort Snelling made its way up Minnehaha Creek (then known as Brown's Creek or Falls Creek) to the lake. In 1851, the Dakota were forced to sell the area including Minnetonka to the United States with the Treaty of Traverse des Sioux. The first census, the Territorial Census of 1857, lists 41 households. Twenty-nine of the heads of households are listed as farmers. The occupations of the remaining twelve are associated with the operations of Minnetonka Mill and a nearby hotel.

In 1852, a claim was staked on Minnehaha Creek near McGinty Road. The sawmill that was constructed in the thick woods of maple, oak, elm, red cedar and basswood was the first privately operated mill in Minnesota west of the Mississippi River. Oak timbers from this mill were used to build the first suspension bridge across the Mississippi River at Saint Anthony Falls in 1853. The settlement of Minnetonka Mills that grew up around the mill was the first permanent European–American settlement west of Minneapolis in Hennepin County. In 1855, a two-story sawmill was constructed with a furniture factory on the second floor. A building for varnishing furniture was built on the south side of the creek, at the present Bridge Street. Production consisted mainly of chairs and bedsteads.

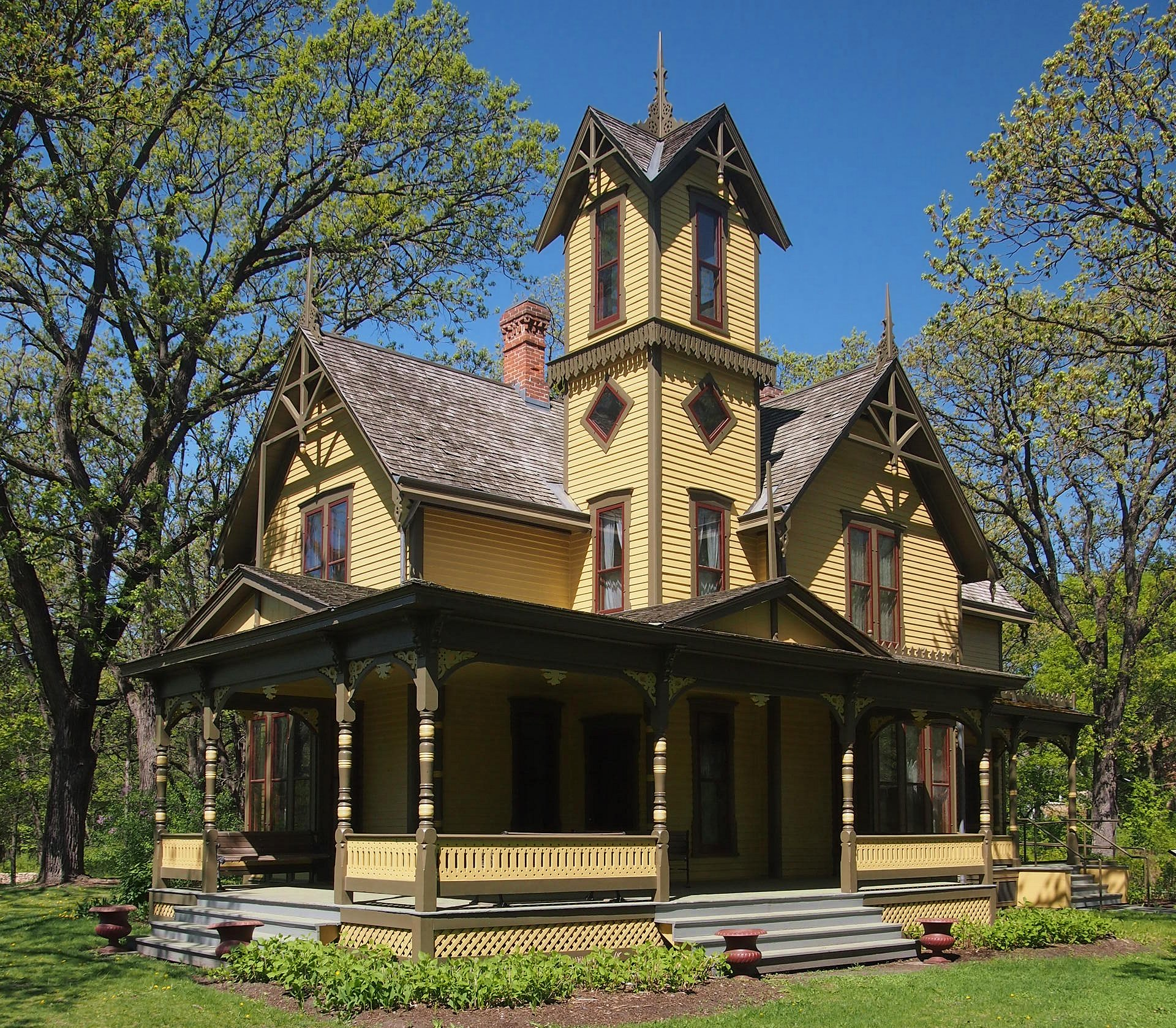
The Charles H. Burwell House

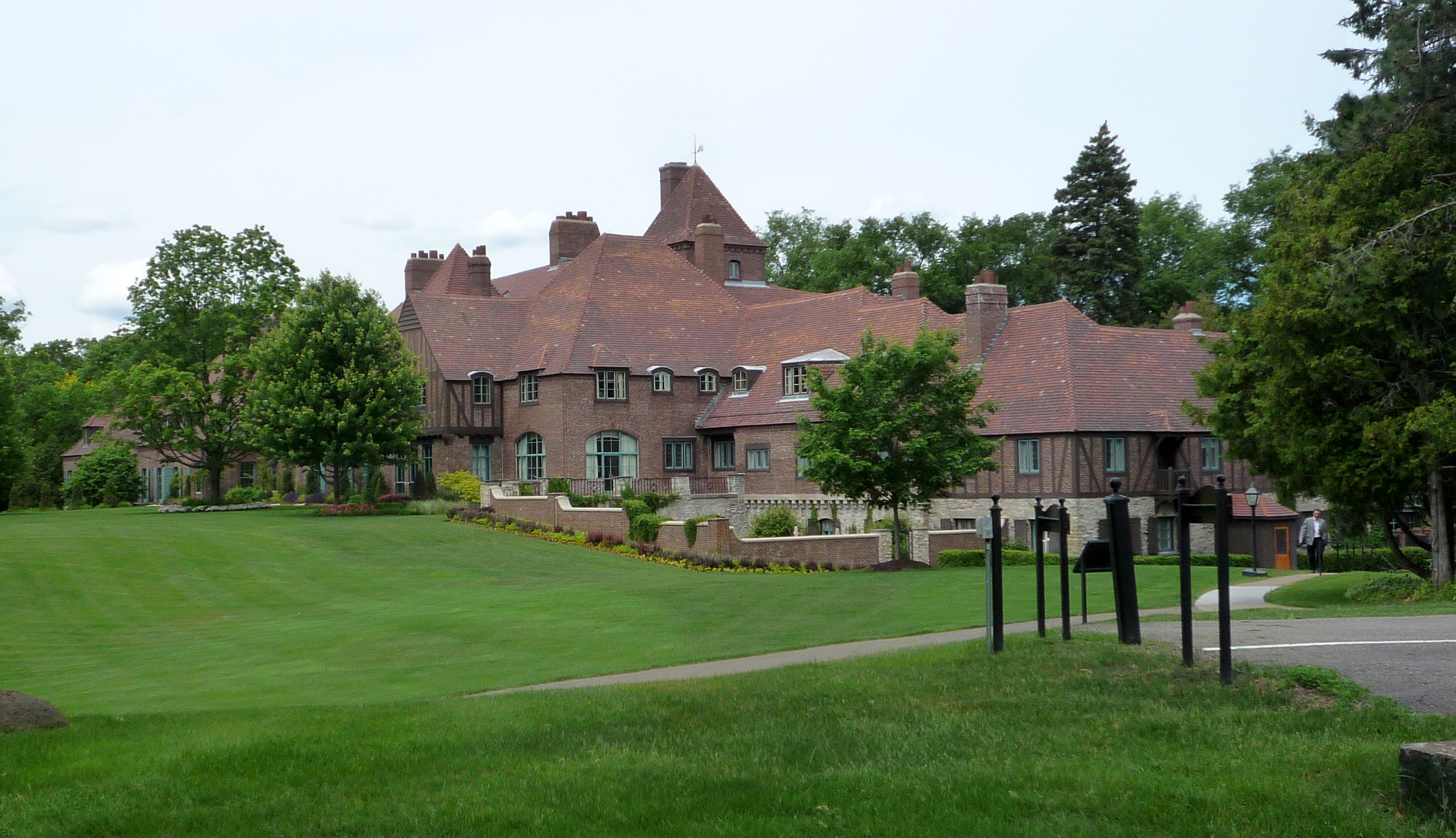
The Cargill Lake Office, occupying a former mansion, formerly housed the company's top executives.

In 1860, after only 8 years of operation, the sawmill closed. In 1869, a flour and grist mill were constructed and operated until the late 1880s. In 1874, Charles H. Burwell came to manage the Minnetonka Mill Company, and he built a Victorian home on the north bank of Minnehaha Creek (Minnetonka Boulevard at McGinty Road East) for his family. The Charles H. Burwell House is now on the National Register of Historic Places and is owned by the city. There were two other mills in Minnetonka: the St. Alban's Mill, which was less than 1 mile (2 km) downstream from Minnetonka Mills on Minnehaha Creek, operated as a flour mill from 1874 to 1881. A grist mill built on Purgatory Creek was washed out in a flood shortly after construction. Minnetonka Mills, with its post office and port for Lake Minnetonka, was the principal business and trading center for a large area until the 1870s.

Between 1883 and 1956, the area within the original 36-square-mile (93 km^{2}) township grew smaller as Wayzata, Hopkins, Deephaven, Woodland and Saint Louis Park incorporated or annexed portions of then-Minnetonka Township.

Until as late as the 1960s, many portions of Minnetonka were still rural in character, with horse pasture and farms. Those final areas have since been developed with the city now a fully developed suburban community.

The Minnetonka Town Hall, built in 1906, is on the National Register of Historic Places.

== Geography ==
According to the United States Census Bureau, the city has a total area of 28.22 square miles (73.09 km^{2}), of which 26.93 square miles (69.75 km^{2}) is land and 1.29 square miles (3.34 km^{2}) is water. The city includes the eastern tip of Lake Minnetonka, one of the largest lakes in Minnesota. The outlet of Lake Minnetonka is Minnehaha Creek, which winds through south Minneapolis and flows over Minnehaha Falls and into the Mississippi River. Minnetonka is located 8 miles (13 km) west of Minneapolis, in Hennepin County.

== Economy ==
The headquarters of Carlson is in Minnetonka. The headquarters of Cargill are located in Minnetonka and are in the Wayzata Post Office area. Founded in 1865, Cargill is the largest privately held corporation in the U.S. in terms of revenue. Other companies based in Minnetonka include UnitedHealth Group, Digital River, Radisson Hotel Group, and the uniform companies AmeriPride Services and G&K Services.

=== Top employers ===
According to the city's 2024 Comprehensive Annual Financial Report, the top employers in the city are:

#	Employer	# of Employees
1	UnitedHealth Group	4,200
2	Carlson Holdings, Inc.	3,600
3	Lake Superior Software, Inc.	3,500
4	Medica Health Plans	2,800
5	Independent School District (No. 276)	2,000
6	Multibrand Field Services, Inc	2,000
7	Continental General Insurance Company	500
8	St. David's School for Child Development & Family Services, Inc.	450
9	Opus National, LLC.	360
10	Veolia WTS Solutions USA, Inc.	300

== Education ==
=== Public schools ===
The city of Minnetonka is covered by three independent school districts. The Hopkins School District, which encompasses the central and eastern part of Minnetonka; the Minnetonka School District, in the western part of city; and the Wayzata School District, which covers an area along the northern boundary of the city. Some students attend public schools in other school districts chosen by their families under Minnesota's open enrollment statute.

Public Schools in Minnetonka (Minnetonka School District)
Elementary School	Junior High School	Senior High School
Clear Springs Elementary	Minnetonka Middle School East	Minnetonka High School
Groveland Elementary	Minnetonka Middle School West	
Scenic Heights Elementary
Minnewashta Elementary
Excelsior Elementary
Deephaven Elementary

The Minnetonka School District also includes four schools outside of the city of Minnetonka: Deephaven Elementary School (Deephaven), Excelsior Elementary School (Excelsior), Minnewashta Elementary School (Shorewood), and Minnetonka Middle School West (Chanhassen).

Public Schools in Minnetonka (Hopkins School District)
Elementary Schools	Junior High School	Senior High School
Gatewood Elementary School	Hopkins West Junior High School	Hopkins High School
Glen Lake Elementary School	Hopkins North Junior High School	
L. H. Tanglen Elementary School

The Hopkins School District comprises two-thirds of the city of Minnetonka, the entirety of Hopkins, and portions of the cities of Golden Valley, Edina, St. Louis Park, Wayzata, and Plymouth. In addition to schools located within Minnetonka, the Hopkins School District also includes four schools in the cities of Hopkins and Golden Valley: Eisenhower Elementary School/Xin Xing Academy (Hopkins), Alice Smith Elementary School (Hopkins), Meadowbrook Elementary School (Golden Valley), and Harley Hopkins Early Childhood/Family Center (Hopkins).

=== Private schools ===
There are three private and parochial schools within Minnetonka's city limits:

- Accell Academy, an accredited private college preparatory school serving grades K-12
- Notre Dame Academy, preschool through eighth grade
- Minnetonka Christian Academy

=== Public libraries ===
The Hennepin County Library has its headquarters in the Ridgedale Library in Minnetonka. The system also operates the Minnetonka Library.

== Demographics ==
Historical population
Census	Pop.	Note	%±
1860	203		—
1870	552		171.9%
1880	1,069		93.7%
1890	1,441		34.8%
1900	1,083		−24.8%
1910	1,538		42.0%
1920	2,298		49.4%
1930	4,601		100.2%
1940	6,466		40.5%
1950	11,896		84.0%
1960	25,037		110.5%
1970	35,776		42.9%
1980	38,683		8.1%
1990	48,370		25.0%
2000	51,301		6.1%
2010	49,734		−3.1%
2020	53,781		8.1%
2022 (est.)	52,544		−2.3%
U.S. Decennial Census; 2020 Census

=== 2020 census ===
As of the 2020 census, Minnetonka had a population of 53,781. The median age was 44.0 years. 19.5% of residents were under the age of 18 and 22.6% of residents were 65 years of age or older. For every 100 females there were 92.1 males, and for every 100 females age 18 and over there were 89.4 males age 18 and over.

100.0% of residents lived in urban areas, while 0.0% lived in rural areas.

There were 23,694 households in Minnetonka, of which 24.4% had children under the age of 18 living in them. Of all households, 50.6% were married-couple households, 15.7% were households with a male householder and no spouse or partner present, and 27.6% were households with a female householder and no spouse or partner present. About 31.3% of all households were made up of individuals and 15.0% had someone living alone who was 65 years of age or older.

There were 25,080 housing units, of which 5.5% were vacant. The homeowner vacancy rate was 0.8% and the rental vacancy rate was 7.9%.

Racial composition as of the 2020 census
Race	Number	Percent
White	44,842	83.4%
Black or African American	2,465	4.6%
American Indian and Alaska Native	118	0.2%
Asian	2,494	4.6%
Native Hawaiian and Other Pacific Islander	9	0.0%
Some other race	704	1.3%
Two or more races	3,149	5.9%
Hispanic or Latino (of any race)	1,950	3.6%

=== 2010 census ===
As of the census of 2010, there were 49,734 people, 21,901 households, and 13,619 families living in the city. The population density was 1,846.8 inhabitants per square mile (713.1/km^{2}). There were 23,294 housing units at an average density of 865.0 per square mile (334.0/km^{2}). The racial makeup of the city was 90.0% White, 3.7% African American, 0.3% Native American, 3.1% Asian, 0.7% from other races, and 2.1% from two or more races. Hispanic or Latino of any race were 2.4% of the population.

There were 21,901 households, of which 25.9% had children under the age of 18 living with them, 52.1% were married couples living together, 7.3% had a female householder with no husband present, 2.8% had a male householder with no wife present, and 37.8% were non-families. 31.1% of all households were made up of individuals, and 11.9% had someone living alone who was 65 years of age or older. The average household size was 2.25 and the average family size was 2.85.

The median age in the city was 45 years. 20.8% of residents were under the age of 18; 6% were between the ages of 18 and 24; 23.2% were from 25 to 44; 33.3% were from 45 to 64; and 16.7% were 65 years of age or older. The gender makeup of the city was 47.5% male and 52.5% female.

=== 2000 census ===
As of the census of 2000, there were 51,301 people, 21,393 households, and 14,097 families living in the city. The population density was 1,893.0 persons per square mile (729.7/km^{2}). There were 22,228 housing units at an average density of 818.9 per square mile (316.2/km^{2}). The racial makeup of the city was 94.40% White, 1.50% African American, 0.20% Native American, 2.29% Asian, 0.03% Pacific Islander, 0.57% from other races, and 1.03% from two or more races. Hispanic or Latino of any race were 1.28% of the population. 24.7% were of German, 13.8% Norwegian, 9.1% Irish, 8.2% Swedish and 6.7% English ancestry.

There were 21,393 households, out of which 29.1% had children under the age of 18 living with them, 56.6% were married couples living together, 6.8% had a female householder with no husband present, and 34.1% were non-families. 27.3% of all households were made up of single individuals and 9.3% had someone living alone who was 65 years of age or older. The average household size was 2.37 and the average family size was 2.92.

In the city, the population was spread out, with 23.1% under the age of 18, 6.0% from 18 to 24, 28.5% from 25 to 44, 28.4% from 45 to 64, and 14.0% who were 65 years of age or older. The median age was 41 years. For every 100 females, there were 91.8 males. For every 100 females age 18 and over, there were 88.7 males.

According to the 2000 census, the median income for a household in the city was $83,437.

== Government ==
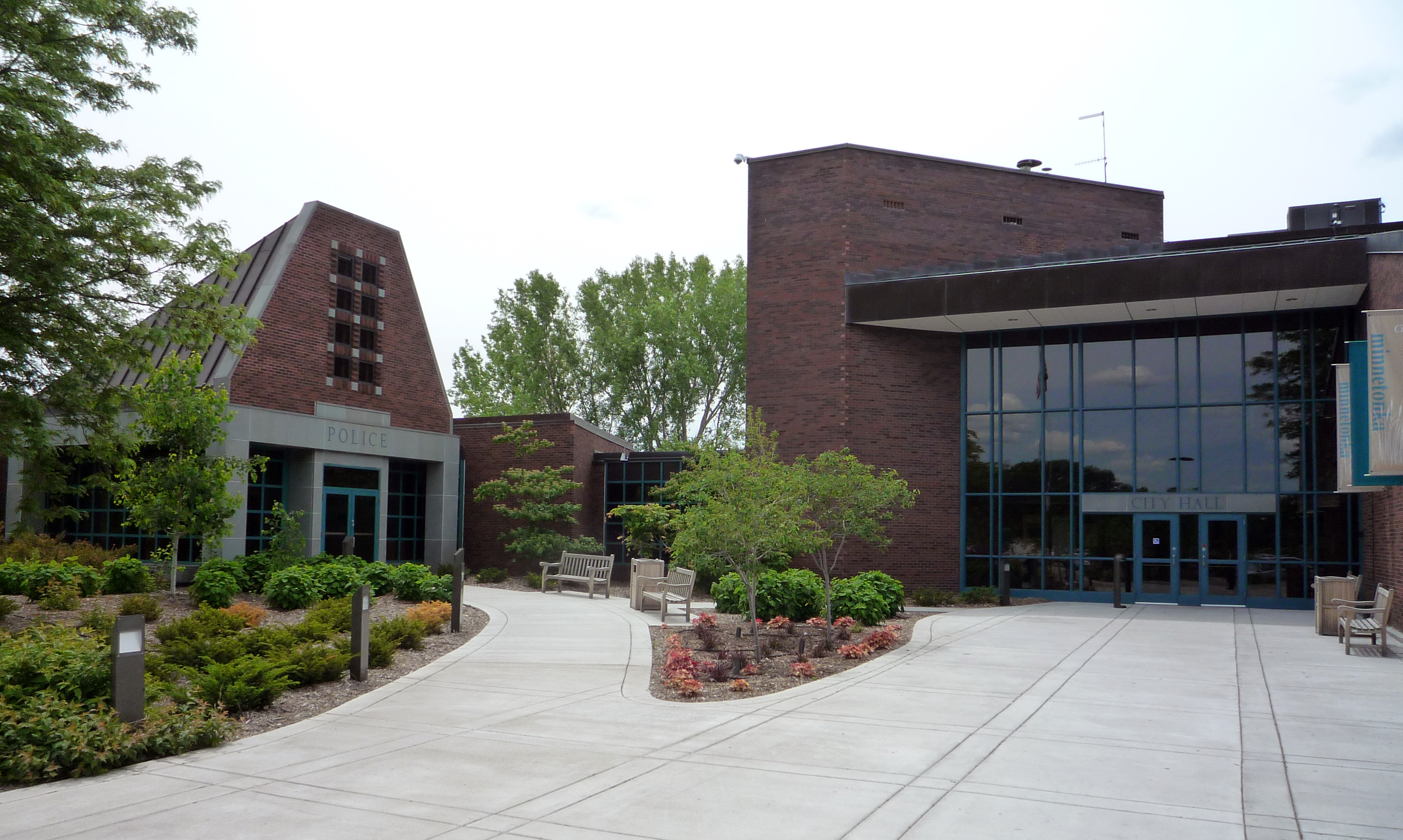
Minnetonka Police Department and City Hall

The City Council of Minnetonka consists of the mayor and six council members. Of the six council members, two are elected at large and the remaining four are elected from wards. The council exercises the legislative power of the city and determines all matters of policy. It has the responsibility of basic decisions for the community, including appointment of the city manager. The city manager is responsible for putting council policies into effect and administering affairs of city government.

The United States Postal Service operates the Minnetonka Post Office and the Minnetonka Carrier Annex. In addition, Minnetonka is served by four zip codes: one representing Minnetonka (55345), two representing Hopkins and Minnetonka (55305, 55343) and one representing Wayzata (55391).

== Politics ==
Minnetonka is located in Minnesota's 3rd congressional district, represented by Democrat Kelly Morrison.

Presidential election results 1956–2024

Precinct General Election Results
Year	Republican	Democratic	Third parties
2024	31.2% 11,301	66.4% 24,088	2.5% 894
2020	31.7% 11,851	66.3% 24,804	2.0% 752
2016	33.6% 11,378	57.7% 19,533	8.7% 3,057
2012	43.2% 14,819	55.1% 18,874	1.7% 579
2008	41.3% 13,814	57.3% 19,171	1.4% 499
2004	45.9% 15,347	53.5% 17,790	0.6% 294
2000	45.9% 14,359	48.9% 15,289	5.2% 1,702
1996	42.0% 11,861	48.7% 13,740	9.3% 2,612
1992	37.9% 11,921	39.3% 12,340	22.8% 7,177
1988	57.7% 15,468	42.3% 11,332	0.0% 0
1984	62.1% 15,056	37.9% 9,195	0.0% 0
1980	51.6% 11,209	34.0% 7,379	14.4% 3,082
1976	58.9% 11,334	39.0% 7,505	2.1% 394
1972	65.0% 10,902	33.6% 5,631	1.4% 235
1968	56.2% 7,946	40.7% 5,751	3.1% 439
1964	52.6% 6,805	47.1% 6,082	0.3% 40
1960	64.5% 7,442	35.3% 4,075	0.2% 25
1956	64.4% 4,835	35.5% 2,665	0.1% 7

== Sports ==
The Minnetonka Dynamo, a bandy club, became national champions of bandy in 1994, 1998 and 2000.

The Minnetonka Millers, a Class A baseball club, became state champions in 2015, 2016, and 2017. The Millers play at Veterans Field, located on the campus of Minnetonka High School.

== Notable people ==
- Beau Allen – professional football player
- Alan Bersten – professional ballroom dancer and choreographer
- Bobby Brink – professional ice hockey player
- Douglas Ewald – Minnesota state legislator
- Jake Gardiner – professional hockey player
- Jack Hillen – retired professional ice hockey player
- Kris Humphries – retired professional basketball player
- Gary Jacobson – professional golfer.
- Will Leer – professional runner
- Ryan McCartan – film and Broadway actor
- Sidney Morin – professional ice hockey player
- Tom Petters – former CEO of Petters Group Worldwide convicted of running a Ponzi scheme.
- Al Quie – former Governor of Minnesota (1979–1983)
- Gretchen Quie – artist and former First Lady of Minnesota (1979–1983)
- Mike Ramsey – member of United States 1980 Olympic Gold Medal hockey team
- Al Sheehan – entertainment businessman and radio host
- Terrell Sinkfield – professional football player
- Dave Snuggerud – professional ice hockey player
- Wesley So – chess grandmaster
- David Stenshoel – musician (Boiled in Lead)
- Judy Traub – Minnesota state senator and community volunteer
- Jill Trenary – professional figure skater

== See also ==
- Minneapolis Jewish Federation
