= Iowa Highway 139 =

State highway in Iowa, United States

Iowa Highway 139
- Iowa 139 highlighted in red

Route information
- Maintained by Iowa DOT
- Length: 11.431 mi (18.396 km)
- Existed: 1930–present

Major junctions
- South end: Iowa 9 / CR W34 east of Cresco
- North end: MN 139 near Harmony, MN

Location
- Country: United States
- State: Iowa
- Counties: Winneshiek

Highway system
- Iowa Primary Highway System; Interstate; US; State; Secondary; Scenic
| ← Iowa 137 | → Iowa 140 |

Iowa Highway 139 (Iowa 139) is an 11-mile-long (18 km) highway in northeastern Iowa. It begins at Iowa 9 east of Cresco and ends at the Minnesota state line, where it continues northward as Minnesota State Highway 139. It crosses the Upper Iowa River near Kendallville. The roadway has been a part of the state's primary highway system since its inception in 1920; however, it has only been known as Iowa 139 since 1930. From 1935 to 1980, the highway extended south to Protivin.

== Route description ==
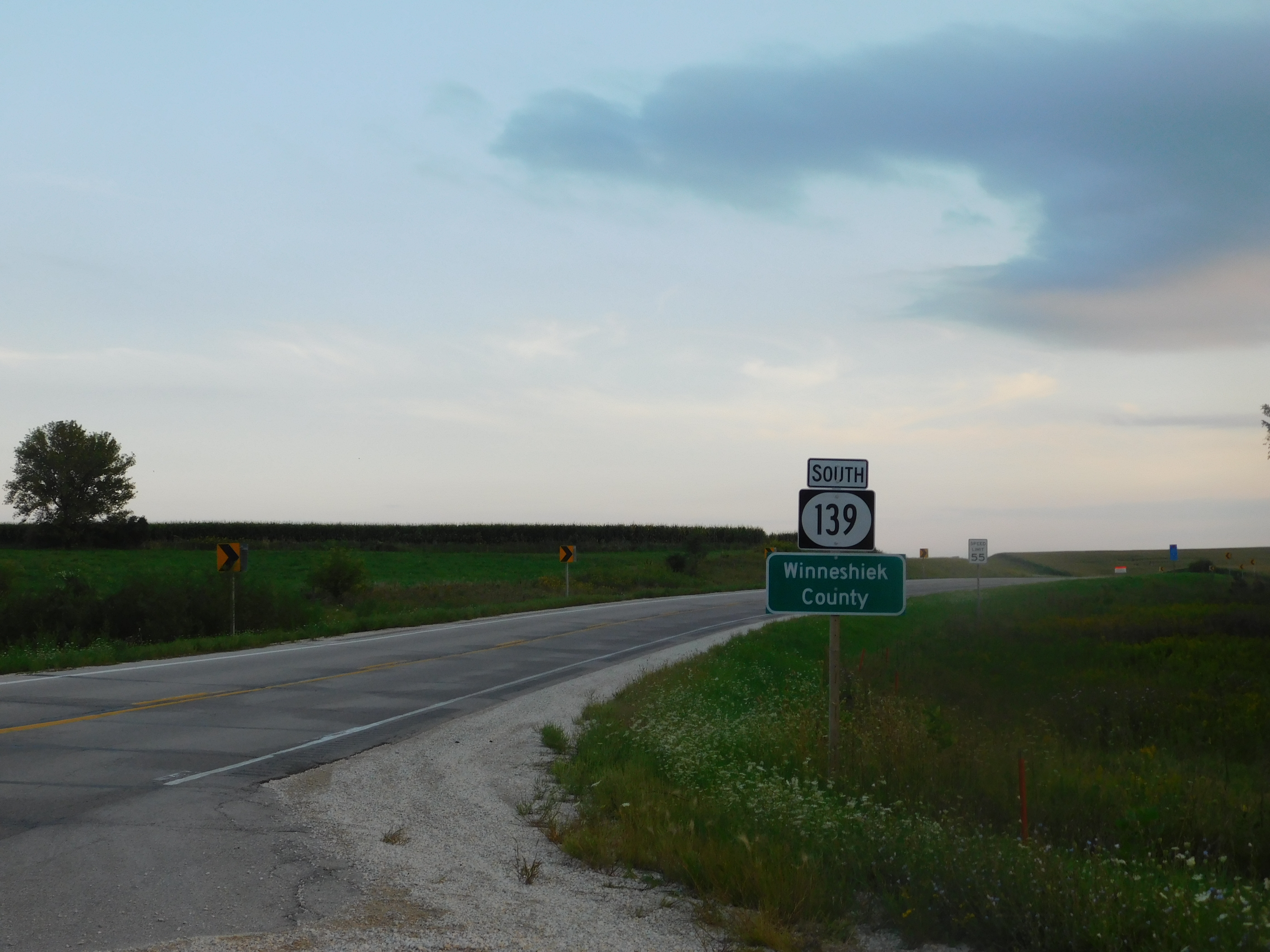
Iowa 139 at the Iowa-Minnesota line.

Iowa 139 begins at an intersection with Iowa 9 on the Howard–Winneshiek county line one mile (1.6 km) east of Cresco. Iowa 9 enters the intersection from the west and the south, County Road W34 (CR W34) makes up the eastern leg, and Iowa 139 heads north. The highway curves to the east, fully entering Winneshiek County, and then back to the north. It snakes through into the Upper Iowa River valley and goes through Kendallville. Rising out of the valley, the road curves to the north and remains in its heading until just before the Minnesota state line. It eases to the east and continues north as Minnesota State Highway 139.

== History ==
The roadway that is now Iowa 139 has been a part of the primary highway system since the system was created in 1920. It was originally part of Primary Road No. 20 (No. 20), which was a north–south route that passed through Decorah, Dubuque, Davenport, Fort Madison, and Keokuk. In 1926, when most of No 20 became U.S. Highway 61 (US 61) and US 55, only the length of the road north of Decorah did not become a U.S. Highway. A short overlap of Iowa 9 was eliminated, which left the segment now known as Iowa 139. However, it would be another four years before it was called Iowa 139. From 1926 to 1930, the graded, dirt road was known as Iowa 130.

In 1935, Iowa 139 was extended southward to Protivin. It overlapped Iowa 9 for two miles (3.2 km) through Cresco and then south for 12 miles (19 km). The Protivin spur was paved in 1955, while the northern half of the route was not paved until 1957. In 1980, the Protivin spur was turned over to Howard County, where today it is CR V58.

== Major intersections ==
| County | Location | mi | km | Destinations | Notes |
|---|---|---|---|---|---|
| Howard–Winneshiek county line | Vernon Springs–Orleans township line | 0.000 | 0.000 | Iowa 9 / CR W34 – Cresco, Decorah | |
| Winneshiek | Fremont Township | 11.431 | 18.396 | MN 139 north – Harmony | Continuation into Minnesota |
1.000 mi = 1.609 km; 1.000 km = 0.621 mi
