= Charles H. Burwell House =

Historic house in Minnetonka, Minnesota, United States

- U.S. National Register of Historic Places
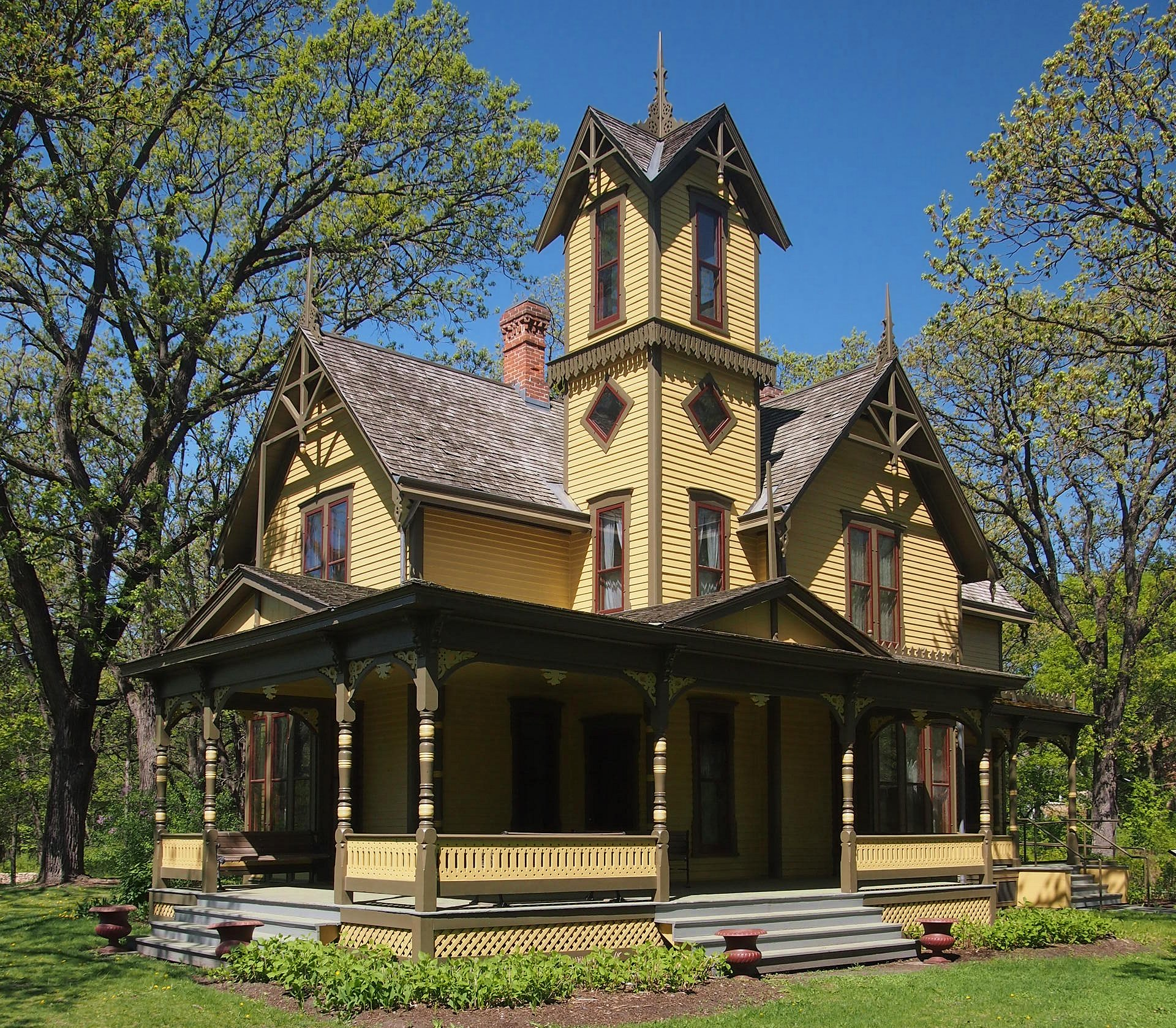
- The Charles H. Burwell house from the southeast

- Location within Minnesota Location within the United States
- Interactive map showing the location of Charles H. Burwell House
- Location: 13209 E. McGinty Road, Minnetonka, Minnesota
- Coordinates: 44°56′29″N 93°26′53″W
- Area: 5 acres (2.0 ha)
- Built: 1883
- Architectural style: Stick style/Eastlake
- NRHP reference No.: 74001025
- Added to NRHP: May 2, 1974

The Charles H. Burwell House is a historic house museum in Minnetonka, Minnesota, United States, built in 1883. Charles H. Burwell (1838–1917) was the secretary and manager of the Minnetonka Mills Company, the first mill west of Minneapolis, around which grew the first permanent Euro-American settlement in Hennepin County west of Minneapolis. This property on Minnehaha Creek, including the house and two outbuildings, is listed on the National Register of Historic Places for its Carpenter Gothic/Stick style architecture and association with Minnetonka's early milling history.

== History ==
Charles H. Burwell was born in New Haven, Connecticut, in 1838. He moved to Minnesota in 1874 after his first wife died having her second child. He married Mary Carey Durham in 1876 and had 2 children by the names of Louise and Lauring, and the family of 6 took up residence in the Minnetonka Hotel until his house was built in 1883. Charles H. Burwell (1838-1917) became manager of the Minnetonka Mill Company in 1874. In 1876, Charles, a widower with two children, Anna and George, married his second wife, Mary Carey Dunham (1855-1933). They had two children, Lousie (1882-1967), and Loring Dunham Burwell (1884-1928). Mr. Burwell died in 1917, and Mrs. Burwell died in 1933. Louise lived in the home until 1958, when she sold it to the William Smith family, which later on got bought by the city. Burwell took pride in his house, as shown by the number of photos he took and in the lack of exterior modifications through the years.

The Minnetonka Mills Company had a short but productive milling career. It produced 300 barrels of flour per day in 1881, but as milling companies in Minneapolis became more powerful, Minnetonka Mills was unable to compete, and it closed down in 1886. Burwell then commuted to Minneapolis where he served as a secretary to businessman and legislator Loren Fletcher. When he died in 1917, Burwell had considerable influence in the community.

== Current use ==
The house is now operated by the Minnetonka Historical Society, with guided tours offered during the summer and around Christmas.

== See also ==
- National Register of Historic Places listings in Hennepin County, Minnesota
