= Mary Pawlenty =

American lawyer and justice

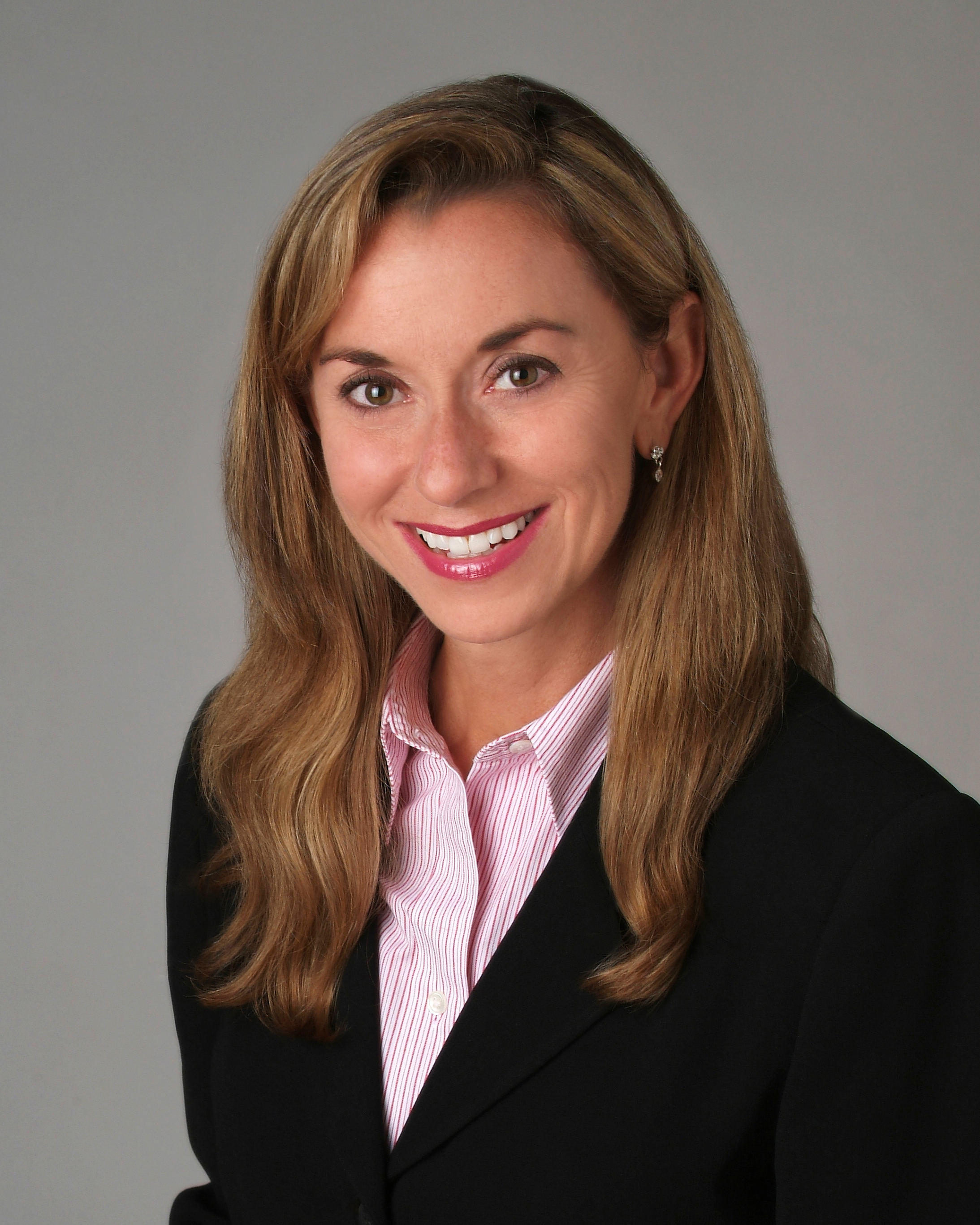
- Pawlenty in 2007

First Lady of Minnesota
- In role January 6, 2003 – January 3, 2011
- Governor: Tim Pawlenty
- Preceded by: Theresa Ventura
- Succeeded by: Gwen Walz (2019)

Judge of the Minnesota First Judicial District Court
- In office October 3, 1994 – February 12, 2007
- Appointed by: Arne Carlson
- Preceded by: Martin Mansur
- Succeeded by: Shawn Moynihan

Personal details
- Born: Mary Elizabeth Anderson; January 13, 1961 (age 65) Edina, Minnesota, U.S.
- Party: Republican
- Spouse: Tim Pawlenty (m. 1987)
- Children: 2
- Education: Bethel University (BA); University of Minnesota (JD)
- Occupation: Attorney; Judge

Mary Elizabeth Anderson Pawlenty (born January 13, 1961) is an American attorney and judge. She was a state court judge who served on Minnesota's First Judicial District from 1994 to 2007. As the wife of Governor Tim Pawlenty, she was First Lady of Minnesota from 2003 to 2011. She previously worked as a private practice attorney and in 2009 became the director at a medical nonprofit. She has been a mediator with Gilbert Mediation since 2007.

== Early life and education ==
Mary Anderson was raised in Edina, Minnesota. In 1979, she graduated from Edina-East High School. In 1983, she graduated from Bethel University, earning a bachelor's degree in political science, summa cum laude. She received her Juris Doctor, cum laude, from the University of Minnesota Law School—where she met Tim Pawlenty—in 1986.

== Legal career ==
Following graduation, Anderson practiced law in Houston, Texas for one year. In 1994, Mary was appointed as a Judge of the District Court of Minnesota for Dakota County in Hastings, Minnesota by Governor Arne Carlson.

== First Lady of Minnesota ==
The family remained at their Eagan home instead of taking the Governor's Residence after Tim Pawlenty was elected Governor of Minnesota in 2002 due to Mary's requirement to stay in her judicial district.

As First Lady of Minnesota, Mary Pawlenty established a web-based program that facilitated the connection between community-based organizations willing to volunteer their time and services and the families of deployed servicemen and women - an initiative that is continued by the Minnesota National Guard as a nationally recognized model for web-based and community support for military families, known as Beyond the Yellow Ribbon.

=== Leaving the judicial bench ===
In January 2007, after her husband was sworn into his second term as governor, Pawlenty announced that she would leave the bench on February 12, 2007. She began work at the National Arbitration Forum shortly thereafter as its general counsel in charge of the National Arbitration Forum's legal affairs. However, she quit her position with National Arbitration Forum and in September, 2007 Pawlenty became a mediator with the Gilbert Mediation Center, where she assists parties in settling disputes, both before and during civil litigation. From January 2009 to January 2010, she was the director of medical diplomacy at Children's HeartLink, an international medical nonprofit organization.

== Personal life ==
She is married to Tim Pawlenty and has two daughters, Anna and Mara. She is a Baptist and attends Wooddale Church, a member congregation of the Minnesota Baptist Conference in Eden Prairie, Minnesota.

Honorary titles
Preceded by Terry Ventura	First Lady of Minnesota; 2003-2011	Succeeded by Vacant
