= Gretchen Quie =

American artist and First Lady of Minnesota (1927–2015)

First Lady of Minnesota
- In role January 4, 1979 – January 3, 1983
- Governor: Al Quie
- Preceded by: Lola Perpich
- Succeeded by: Lola Perpich

Personal details
- Born: Gretchen Marie Hansen; August 4, 1927 Waverly, Iowa, U.S.
- Died: December 13, 2015 (aged 88) Minnetonka, Minnesota, U.S.
- Spouse: Al Quie (m. 1948)
- Education: St. Olaf College
- Occupation: Artist

Gretchen Marie Quie (née Hansen; August 4, 1927 – December 13, 2015) was an American artist, painter, potter, writer, and advocate for the arts. Quie served as the First Lady of Minnesota from 1979 until 1983 during the administration of her husband, Governor Al Quie. As First Lady, Quie established the State Ceremonial Building Council to oversee the restoration of the Minnesota Governor's Residence. She also opened the Governor's Mansion to the general public through programs including, "Night at the Mansion," which chose Minnesotans through a lottery to spend the night at the residence. Al and Gretchen Quie invited a family of Vietnamese refugees to live at the Governor's Residence's renovated carriage house to encourage Minnesotans to sponsor more refugees.

Her official manuscripts are housed in the collection of the Minnesota Historical Society.

== Biography ==
Quie was born Gretchen Marie Hansen to Ella and Sam Hansen on August 4, 1927, in Waverly, Iowa. Her father, Sam Hansen, was a school administrator who relocated the family to Minnesota. The Hansens moved to Harmony, Minnesota, and Benson, Minnesota. They finally relocated to Minneapolis, the state's largest city, where her father opened a business specializing in teacher placement.

Gretchen Hansen graduated from the now defunct Central High School in Minneapolis in 1945. She then majored in art at St. Olaf College and also spent a summer tern at Cranbrook Academy of Art in Michigan. She met her husband, Al Quie, a retired United States Navy pilot while at St. Olaf. The couple married in June 1948 and Gretchen Quie left St. Olaf one year before her planned graduation. The Quies relocated to his family farm in Rice County, Minnesota. Quie, now the wife of a farmer, became active in local organizations, including the Grace Lutheran Church in Nerstrand and the Dennison Study Club. Gretchen continued painting often interpreting familiar scenes around the farm and the Rice County area. Al Quie was elected to the Minnesota State Senate while working the farm. They had four children in Rice County prior to Quie's election to the United States House of Representatives in 1958. Their fifth child, Ben, was born in Silver Spring, Maryland, while Quie was a member of Congress.

Quie designed much of the artwork installed in Saint Stephen Lutheran Church in Silver Spring, Maryland, including the church's stained glass windows, mosaics, and tapestries. She also established a women's art guild at the church and served as the President of the Montgomery County Potters from 1976 to 1977.

She resumed her art studies at the University of Maryland. The credits were transferred to St. Olaf College, allowing her to complete her bachelor's degree in art in 1971.

=== First Lady of Minnesota ===
Al Quie was elected Governor of Minnesota in 1978. The Governor, First Lady and their youngest son, Ben, moved into the Minnesota Governor's Residence in 1979. Gretchen Quie found the residence in need of repairs and renovations, which were ongoing at the time. She created the State Ceremonial Building Council to oversee improvements and renovations to the mansion. In 1980, the Minnesota Legislature authorized Quie's State Ceremonial Building Council to create an official "architectural master plan" of the mansion to guide its restoration efforts. Quie also founded the 1006 Summit Avenue Society, a volunteer organization created to oversee the ongoing maintenance and remodeling of the Governor's mansion. In 1981, Quie authored "The Governor's Table," a cookbook containing anecdotes and recipes liked by past Governors of Minnesota, which was published by the 1006 Summit Avenue Society. She also released her autobiography, "In the Potter's Hand," in 1981.

Gretchen Quie is credited with opening the Governor's Mansion to the general public. The Governor and First Lady invited a family of Vietnamese refugees to live in their renovated carriage house on the grounds of the mansion to encourage Minnesotans to sponsor more refugees. Gretchen Quie also created "Night at the Mansion." The program selected Minnesota residents through a lottery to have dinner with the Quies and sleep in the Governor's Residence's guest bedroom.

=== Career and later life ===
Al Quie decided not to seek re-election in 1982. Al and Gretchen Quie moved to Minnetonka, Minnesota, in 1983, where she continued to pursue her artistic career. Gretchen Quie and her business partner established Celebration Design, a design firm which was located on St. Paul's Grand Avenue which focused on religious artwork. She served on the boards of numerous organizations, including the American Refugee Council, Art Education of Minnesota, Committee on Immunization Practices, the Girl Scout Council, KIDS Inc., the Nutrition Education and Advisory Council, the Salvation Army Council, the Minneapolis Society of Fine Arts, and the World Population Balance.

Quie was diagnosed with Parkinson's disease in 2005, necessitating her retirement from art. Her husband became her primary caregiver.

Gretchen Quie died from Parkinson's disease at Folkstone Presbyterian Homes Wayzata, Minnesota, on December 13, 2015, at the age of 88. She was survived by her husband, former Governor Al Quie; their five children – Fred, Jennifer (Coffin), Dan, Joel, and Ben; her brother, John Hansen; fourteen grandchildren, and thirteen great-grandchildren. Her funeral was held at Christ Presbyterian Church in Edina, Minnesota.

Honorary titles
Preceded by Lola Perpich	First Lady of Minnesota; 1979–1983	Succeeded by Lola Perpich
