= Ole N. Thundale =

Minnesota politician (1864–1913)

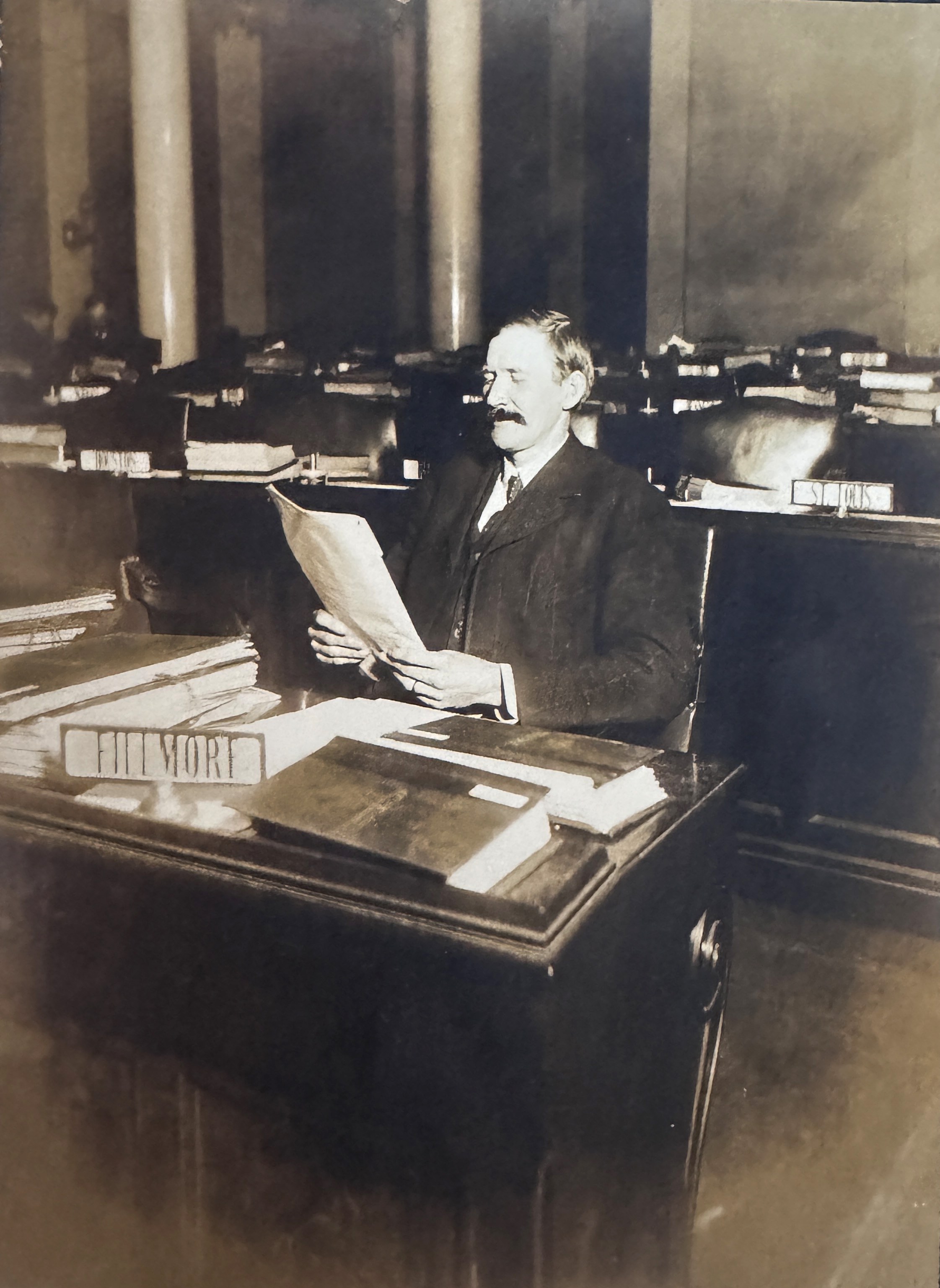
- Thundale in the Minnesota House of Representatives, c.1905–1908

Member of the Minnesota House of Representatives
- In office 1905–1908
- Constituency: District 5 (Fillmore County)

Personal details
- Born: November 30, 1864 Voss Municipality, Norway
- Died: November 22, 1913 (aged 48) Harmony, Minnesota, U.S.
- Party: Republican
- Spouse: Betsie Benson (m. 1893)
- Children: Emma Glendora, Ruth Ester
- Profession: merchant, banker, village president, state representative

Ole N. Thundale (November 30, 1864 – November 22, 1913) was a Norwegian-American merchant, banker, and politician. He served in the Minnesota House of Representatives from 1905 to 1908, representing Fillmore County’s 5th District.

== Background ==
Thundale was born on November 30, 1864, in Voss Municipality, Søndre Bergenhus county, Norway, and immigrated to the United States in 1885. He settled in Harmony, Minnesota.

When Thundale immigrated to Minnesota in 1885, he arrived sick, broke, and with no local connections. He arrived at the Rockne homestead seeking work. Mrs. Rockne, the mother of A. J. Rockne, noticed that he was ill and took him in to nurse him back to health. After he recovered and found work, Thundale later said he attempted to repay the Rockne family for their help, but they refused. Years later, he said the experience stayed with him and influenced his later support for Anton J. Rockne's political career.

== Residence ==
Thundale’s former residence in Harmony still stands and was listed in A Walkabout Tour of Harmony, a walking tour and map published by the Harmony Centennial Committee in July 1996. According to the guide, Thundale built the house between 1892 and 1894 at a cost of less than $1,400. The guide also states that Thundale’s daughter, Emma Rostvold (Mrs. Milford), lived in the house until 1976. His home remained in the Thundale–Rostvold family for more than 80 years.

== Land ownership ==
In 1908, Thundale purchased an 80-acre farm located approximately one mile from Harmony from his father-in-law, Even Benson. The property, formerly known as the Charles Thompson farm, had been owned by Benson prior to the sale.

== Career ==
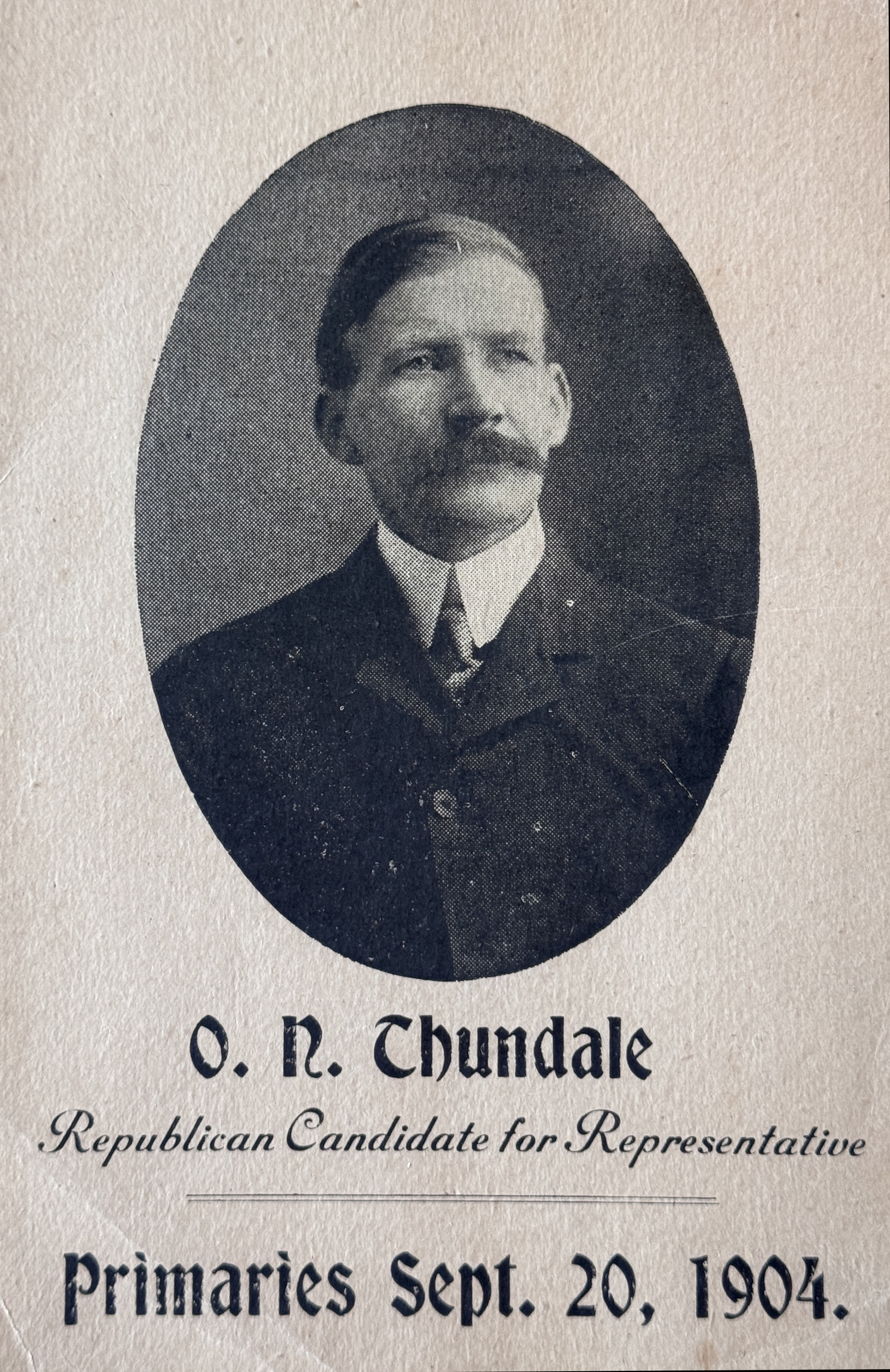
Thundale during the Republican primaries, September 20, 1904

=== Early mercantile and business career ===
According to a historical account published in the Harmony News, Thundale and Martin H. Hansohn formed a partnership and began a general merchandise business in the village in the spring of 1890, operating under the name Harmony Department Store.

Newspaper advertisements from March 1896 show the Harmony Department Store operating under the partnership name Thundale & Hansohn.

By 1900, advertisements list the Harmony Department Store with O. N. Thundale as proprietor.

=== Banking career ===
In May 1904, the Harmony State Bank was authorized by the state bank examiner to begin business as a state banking institution with capital stock of $20,000.

When the Harmony State Bank was organized in 1904, Thundale was elected vice president of the bank and was also a shareholder and a member of the first board of directors, as listed in the bank’s published articles of incorporation.

Bank advertisements published in the Harmony News in later years often listed Thundale as vice president while also identifying him as a director, including an advertisement dated January 10, 1907.

In an advertisement published on January 17, 1907, Thundale was listed as a director but was no longer identified as vice president.

By February 1908, bank advertisements no longer listed Thundale as a director of the Harmony State Bank. A January 16, 1908 advertisement continued to list him as a director, while a February 6, 1908 advertisement no longer included his name.

=== Local government ===
He was elected as village president (mayor) of Harmony in 1899 and 1902, and elected as a trustee (city council member) on the Harmony village board in 1897 and 1901.

He also served as a member of Harmony’s board of education.

He was also noted in the Mabel Sentinel as serving Harmony in both executive and council roles at different points in his life.

=== State legislature ===
In 1904, Thundale began seeking election to the Minnesota House of Representatives. Local newspaper coverage during his campaign emphasized Thundale’s background as a businessman rather than a career politician, highlighting his role in Harmony’s commercial life.

Before Thundale was elected for the first time, news reporting noted that Harmony had not produced a state representative for many years, a point emphasized by local supporters.

He was elected to the Minnesota House of Representatives and served from 1905 to 1908.

The 1906 Republican primary for the Minnesota House in Fillmore County drew an unusually large field of candidates, and Thundale finished first, securing renomination for a second term.

Thundale and fellow Norwegian-American Anton J. Rockne had ties prior to Rockne’s political career, and Thundale was the first to lobby for Rockne to become Speaker of the Minnesota House.

=== Later business and commercial activity ===
In 1906 and 1907, Thundale served as president and director of the Northwestern Consolidated Land, Lumber & Iron Company.

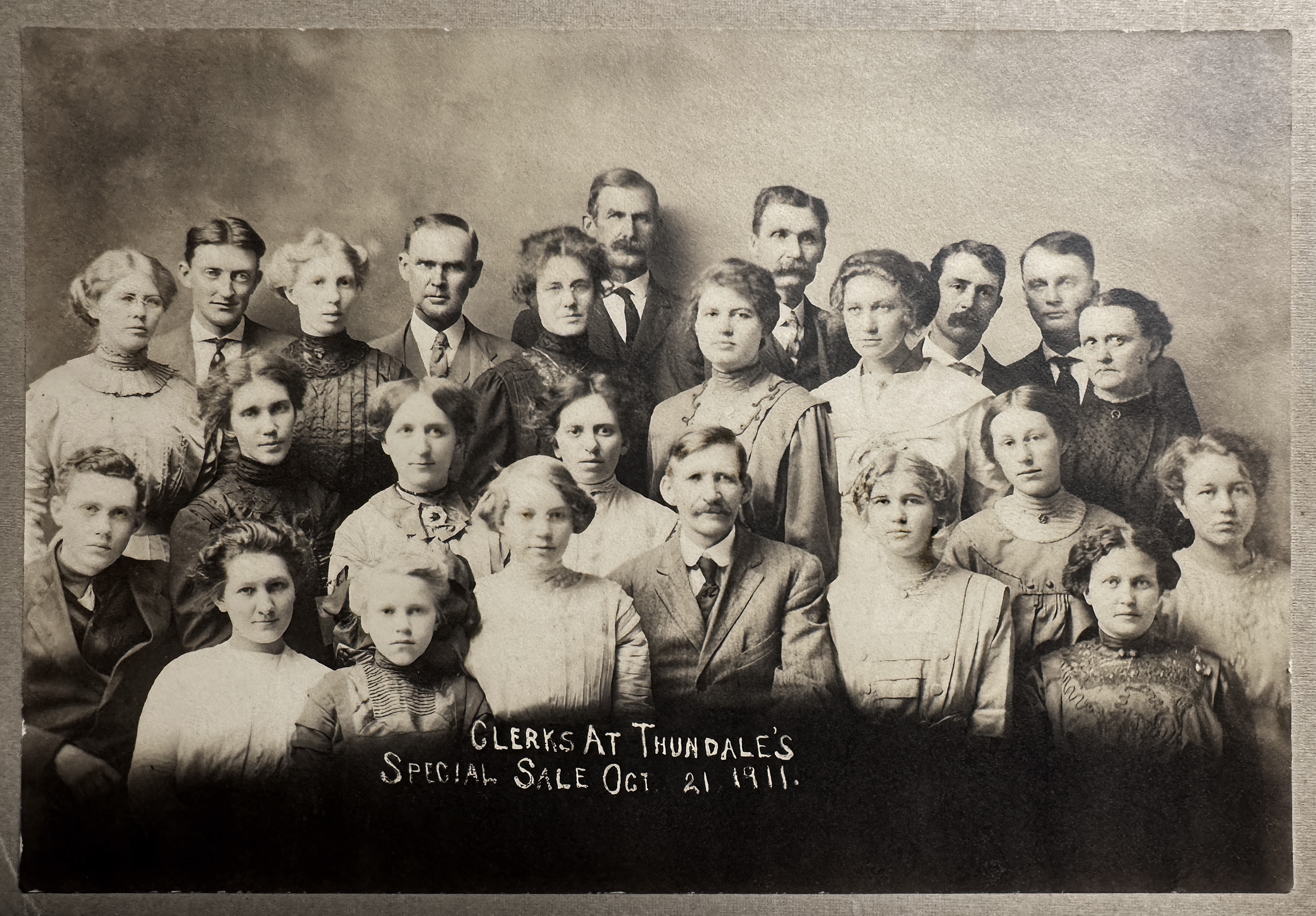
Portrait of clerks at O.N. Thundale's store

In 1907, the Harmony News reported that Tollefson & Hellickson had purchased the stock of general merchandise from O. N. Thundale Co., which had been operating the Harmony Department Store.

A 1911 Harmony News advertisement for a clearing sale again lists O. N. Thundale as proprietor of the Harmony Department Store.

In a September 1912 advertisement, Thundale announced a closing-out sale of the Harmony Department Store, stating that poor health compelled him to discontinue business, writing, “I am not having this sale because I like to, but because I have to.”

Thundale was president of the Harmony Telephone Exchange Company, as reported in a meeting announcement published in 1911.

Thundale also served as an assistant at the Harmony post office in 1911.

== Travel writings ==
In 1901, Thundale left Harmony to travel through the southern United States. While away, he wrote a series of letters to his community in Harmony, Minnesota, which were published on the front page of the Harmony News. The letters described what he observed during his travels and shared his firsthand impressions of Texas during a period of rapid economic and social change. Written for a local audience, the letters offered information and perspective at a time when long-distance communication depended almost entirely on written correspondence.

=== Published August 8, 1901 — Galveston and the Texas oil boom ===
In a letter dated July 26, 1901, published under the heading Through Southern States, Thundale reported from Texas on the aftermath of the 1900 Galveston hurricane. He described the widespread destruction that was still visible in Galveston, including damaged buildings, ruined neighborhoods, and sharply reduced property values. He also noted that the city continued to function as a major seaport. His account conveyed the lingering uncertainty felt by residents as they faced ongoing fears about future storms and the safety of the island.

The second letter in this issue was dated August 1, 1901. In it, Thundale turned his attention to early oil development near Beaumont, Texas. He described drilling activity at Spindletop, the scale of production, and the sudden wealth generated by new discoveries. He noted the rise of figures such as Anthony Francis Lucas, whose discovery well came to symbolize both the enormous fortunes and intense speculation surrounding the Texas oil boom. In this correspondence, Thundale combined material from the Houston Post with his own firsthand observations to add context and detail to the events he was describing. This gave readers in Harmony access to fuller and more reliable reporting than they would otherwise have had.

=== Published August 15, 1901 — Agriculture and social conditions ===
In a continuation of the Through Southern States series, published on August 15, 1901, Thundale focused on agricultural life in southeastern Texas. He described rice farming, irrigation canals, tenant labor, and land values. He often compared southern farming practices with those familiar to Midwestern readers. His observations highlighted differences in climate, crops, and rural living conditions.

His writings also included observations on racial segregation and labor conditions in the southern states. Thundale described the rigid separation of Black and white residents in transportation, housing, and public spaces. He noted that these practices differed from what he was accustomed to in his home community. The tone of his writing conveyed unease as he relayed these conditions to readers in Minnesota.

=== Published February 27, 1902 — Oil speculation and investment warnings ===
In a letter dated February 10, 1902, published under the heading More About Texas, Thundale returned to the subject of oil development in Texas. Writing from Fort Worth, Texas, he reported continued drilling activity and the rapid formation of new oil companies. He cautioned that many promoted exaggerated claims. He warned readers that speculative ventures carried significant financial risk for those who did not fully understand what they were investing in.

== Community involvement ==
Thundale and his wife commissioned and donated an altar painting by Norwegian-American artist Herbjørn Gausta to Greenfield Lutheran Church, as reported in the Harmony News in 1913. The artwork depicts Christ as the Good Shepherd. After the Greenfield Prairie church was demolished in 1919, the painting was given to a Lutheran church in Fremont, Minnesota; when that church later closed, the painting was donated to the Vesterheim Norwegian-American Museum in Decorah, Iowa.

== Death ==
Thundale died at his home in Harmony, Minnesota, on November 22, 1913, from pulmonary tuberculosis. His death was reported on the front page of the Harmony News under the headline “Harmony’s Most Prominent Citizen Dead After Long Illness of Tuberculosis.”

During the final year of his life, he spent several months receiving treatment at a sanitarium in Texas before returning to Harmony in the summer of 1913.

The funeral drew a crowd larger than the church could accommodate and was described by the Harmony News as one of the largest ever held in the community. He was buried at Greenfield Cemetery.

== See also ==
- Fillmore County, Minnesota
- Minnesota House of Representatives
