= Minneapolis Jewish Federation =

U.S. non-profit organization

- Formation: 1920; 106 years ago
- Type: 501(c)(3) organization
- Tax ID no.: 41-0693866
- Headquarters: Minneapolis, Minnesota
- Website: www.jewishminneapolis.org

The Minneapolis Jewish Federation is a non-profit organization with offices in Minnetonka, Minnesota, that serves the Minneapolis Jewish and general communities. Along with partner agencies, the Federation nurtures and educates children, maintains and strengthens family life, brings comfort and care to the elderly and reinforces and sustains the connection to the worldwide Jewish community.

== History ==
The Minneapolis Jewish Federation, or simply Federation as it is familiarly called, was first founded in 1930 in order to coordinate fundraising and social service planning and delivery within the Jewish community. Its first local beneficiary agency was the Talmud Torah, a community Jewish educational supplementary school. The remainder of the funds raised was sent to national or international causes—hospitals, orphanages, and yeshivas. The organization concentrated on fundraising during its early years, a task made difficult by the Depression. It created the Minnesota Jewish Council in order to combat anti-Semitism in the late 1930s. It attempted to act as the coordinating body for anti Nazi protests during the late 1930s and into the 1940s. As Federation expanded, it added separate support divisions—in 1946 a Women's Division was announced, and in 1978 the Young Leadership Division began.

The Federation provides a Jewish education to over 2,150 Minneapolis students in grades K-12; 25,000 kosher meals to 120 isolated seniors; programming and outreach to nearly 1,200 Jewish students at the University of Minnesota; individualized support to 220 children with special needs in Jewish community schools; and case management and social services to 500 Jewish Seniors. Overseas, Federation supports to more than 100 disabled adults in Israel, allowing them to live independently; basic needs including housing, nutrition and medication to more than 13,000 Israeli seniors; life-saving food packages, medicine and winter relief to 26,000 children in the Former Soviet Union (FSU); education assistance to over 1,000 Ethiopian-Israeli children in pre-school to 6th grade, helping them integrate into Israeli society; and 10,000 children the chance to strengthen their Jewish identity through Jewish summer camps and youth groups in the FSU.
