= Carolina Academic Press =

Academic publisher

- Parent company: Independent
- Status: Active
- Founded: 1974; 52 years ago
- Founder: Keith Sipe
- Country of origin: United States
- Headquarters location: Durham, North Carolina
- Distribution: Worldwide
- Publication types: Books, Educational Software
- Nonfiction topics: Law, Academic Texts
- Official website: www.cap-press.com

Carolina Academic Press (also known as CAP) is an academic publisher of books and software. Since entering the legal education market in the late 1970s, Carolina Academic Press has become a major publisher of law school textbooks. Today, CAP publishes more than 100 books a year in academic fields ranging from legal education and criminal justice to anthropology and African studies. In 2011, CAP released its first software package, Core Grammar for Lawyers, which has been used by more than half of the law schools in the United States.

== History ==
Keith Sipe founded Carolina Academic Press in 1974. Sipe began publishing after living in Pakistan on a Fulbright scholarship. The press's first titles were American editions of foreign scholarship. The first title to use the CAP imprint was India/China: Underdevelopment and Revolution by the widely known journalist, Nigel Harris. Within a few years, however, CAP was publishing original scholarship and began entering new markets. The first manuscript signed was Richard Remnek's, Soviet Scholars and Soviet Foreign Policy which was published in 1975.

In 1978, Carolina Academic Press published Plain English for Lawyers by Richard Wydick. Arriving at a time when the plain English reform movement was reaching national popularity, the book soon became what The New York Times called the "most popular legal text today." The book's success spurred the firm to enter the legal publishing field.

On January 1, 2016, Carolina Academic Press acquired the Law School Publishing Division of LexisNexis. This acquisition added more than 500 new titles to the CAP list.

The firm has its headquarters in the historic Fitzgerald office building near downtown Durham.
