= Niagara Cave =

Cave in Minnesota, United States

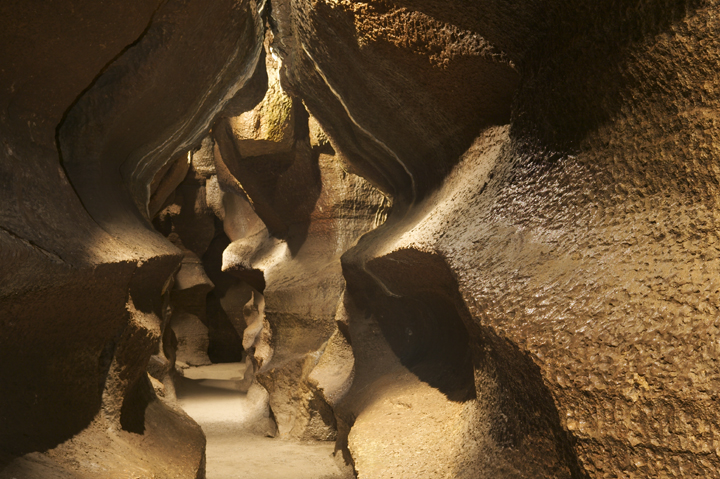
- Passageway in Niagara Cave

- Location within the United States
- Location: Fillmore County, Minnesota, United States
- Coordinates: 43.5140°N 92.0551°W
- Depth: 200 ft
- Discovery: 1924
- Geology: Galena formation, Ordovician Limestone
- Access: Tours are available in season
- Lighting: Solar Energy
- Visitors: 25,000 - 30,000 per year
- Features: Underground river, Subterranean waterfall, Wedding chapel, Fossils
- Website: niagaracave.com

Niagara Cave is a limestone cave located in Harmony, Minnesota. The cave is approximately 200 feet (61 m) deep; features include an underground stream, 60-foot waterfall, fossils, stalactites and stalagmites. The cave is privately owned, with tours available seasonally.

The cave was first discovered in 1924, by kids, and later in 1932, three spelunkers Al Cremer, Leo Tekippe, and Joe Flynn explored the cave and named the site Niagara Cave. Niagara Cave opened as a show cave in June 1934, and was described by geologist J Harlen Bretz in 1938.

The Minnesota Geological Survey noted in their 1995 survey, "Niagara Cave contains an excellent example of an underground river, complete with waterfall."

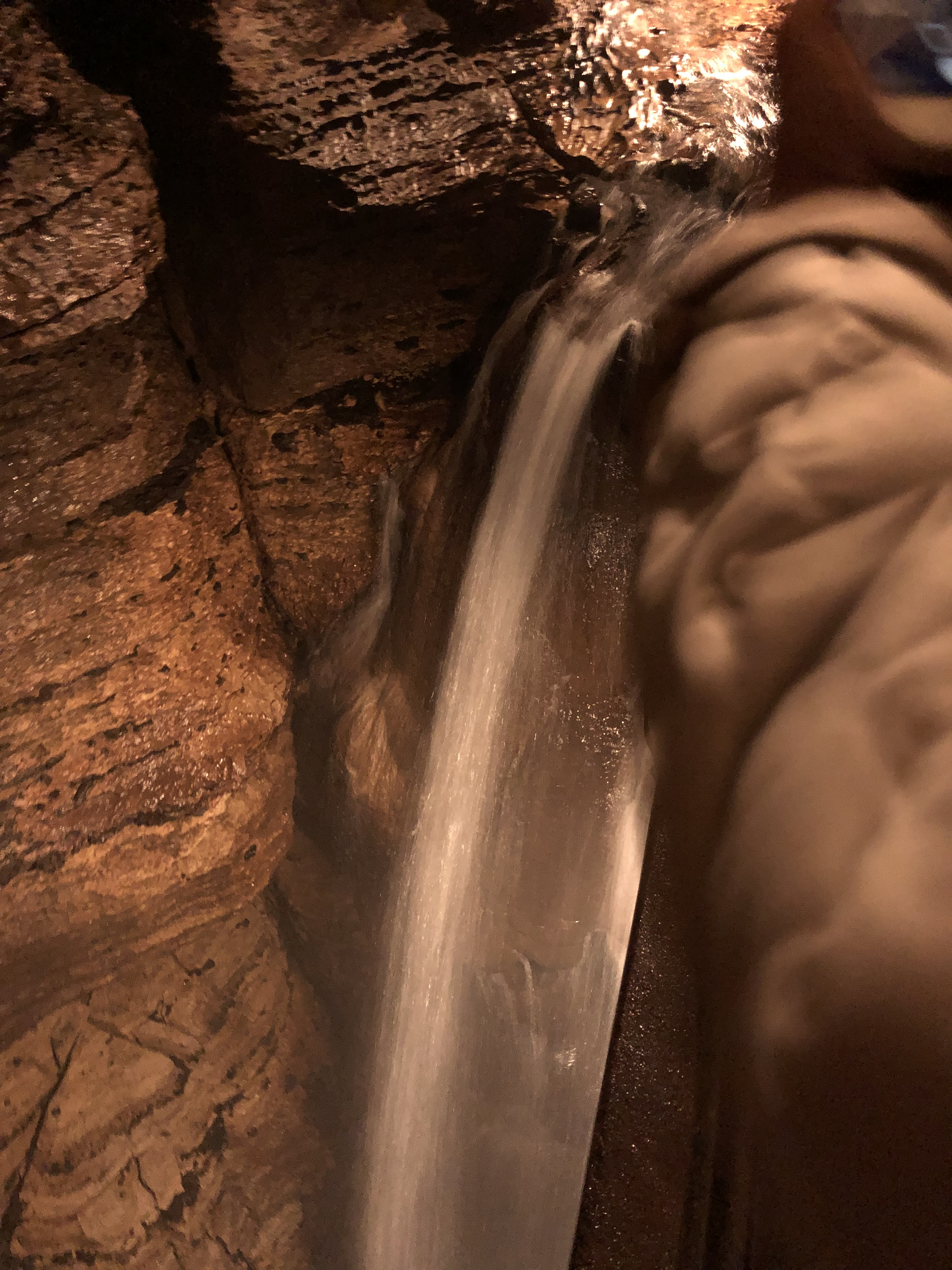
Niagara Cave waterfall

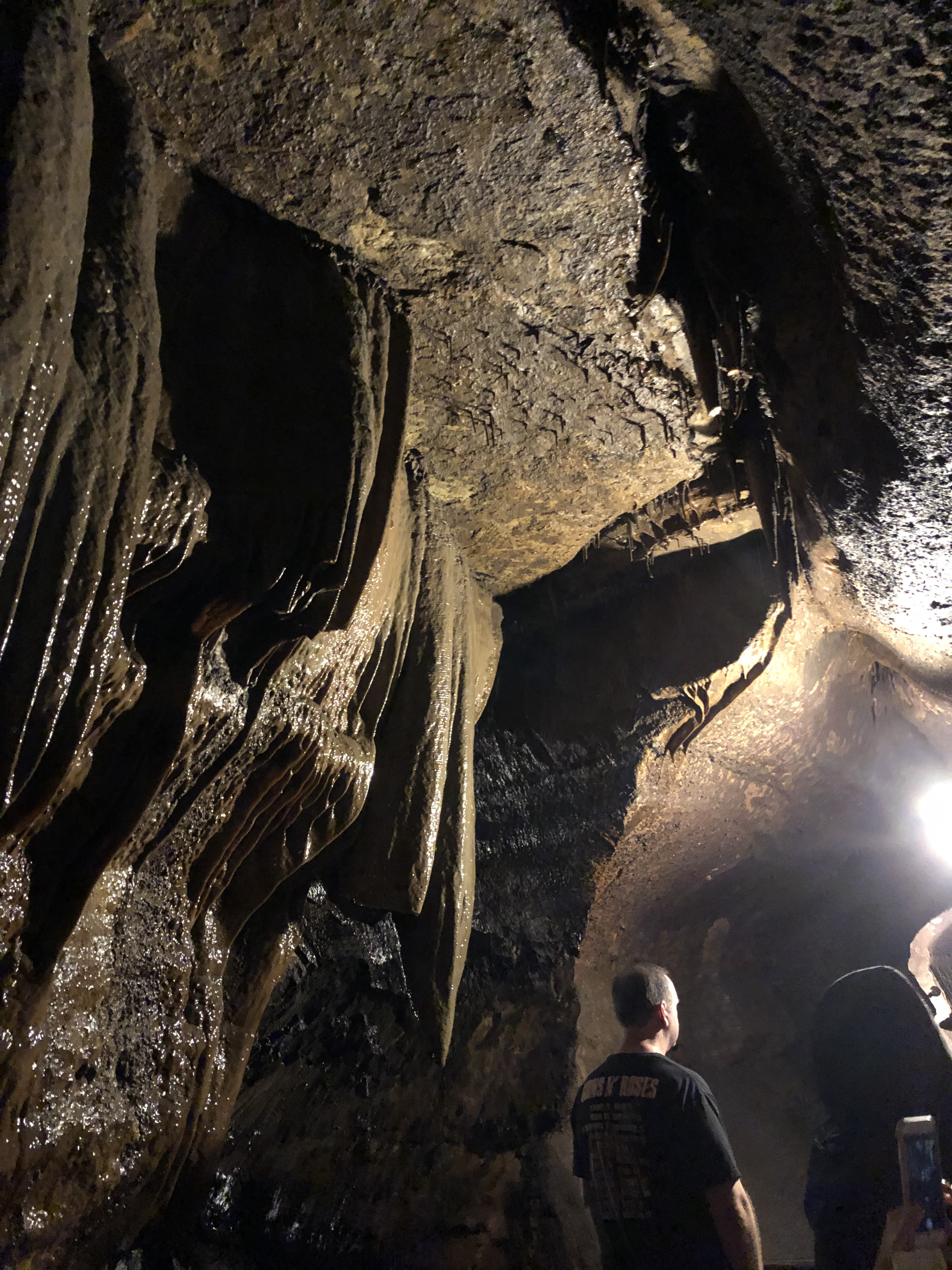
Niagara cave wall

== See also ==
- List of waterfalls
