= Gwen Walz =

First Lady of Minnesota since 2019

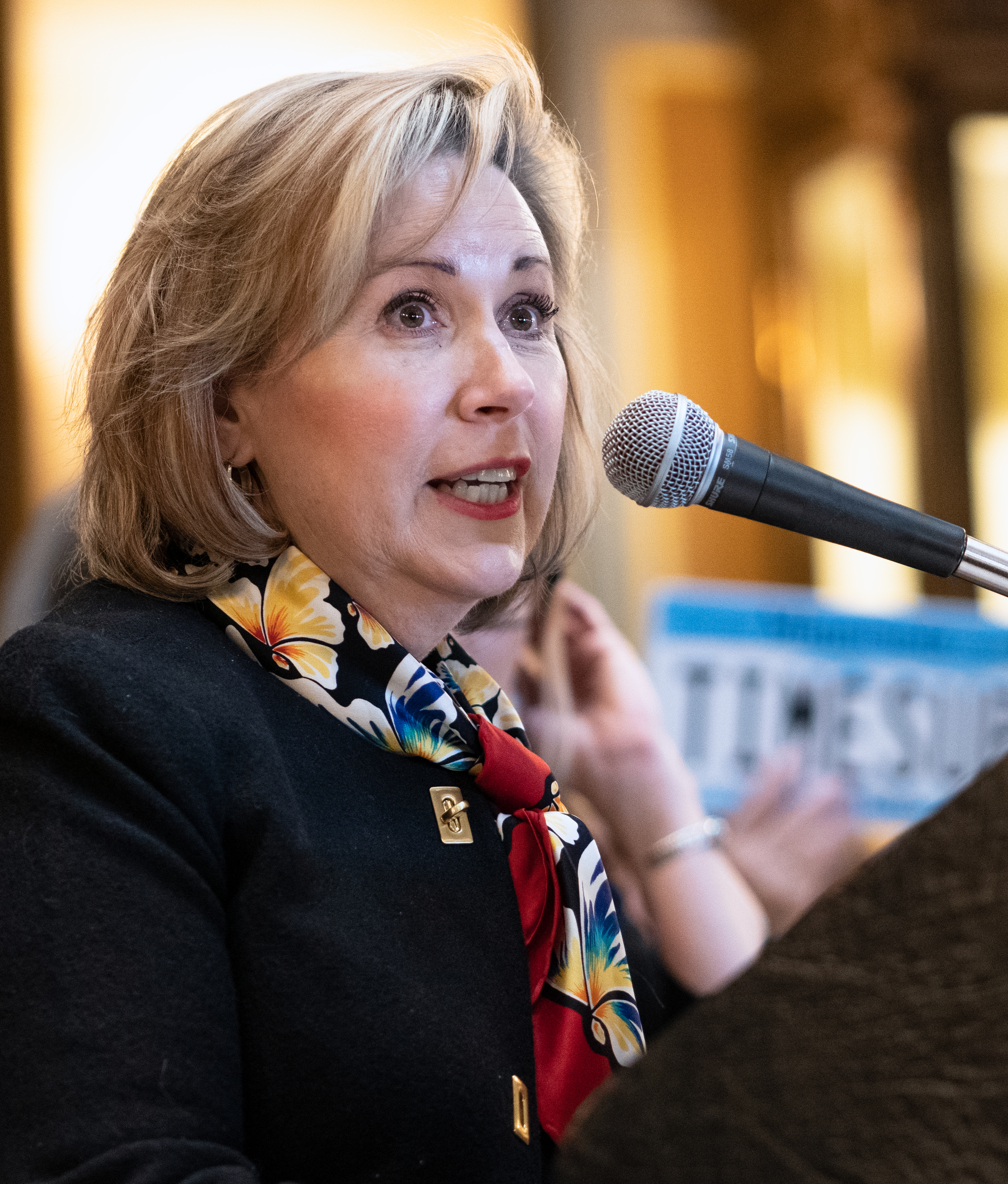
- Walz in 2019

First Lady of Minnesota
- Current
- Assumed role January 7, 2019
- Governor: Tim Walz
- Preceded by: Mary Pawlenty (Note: Mark Dayton was divorced, so there was no First Lady of Minnesota between January 3, 2011, and January 7, 2019.)

Personal details
- Born: Gwen Whipple; June 15, 1966 (age 60) Glencoe, Minnesota, U.S.
- Party: Democratic
- Spouse: Tim Walz (m. 1994)
- Children: 2
- Education: Gustavus Adolphus College (BA); Minnesota State University, Mankato (MA)

Gwen Walz (née Whipple; born June 15, 1966) is an American educator and public school administrator. She is the 39th First Lady of Minnesota as of 2019 and the wife of Governor Tim Walz. Her husband was the Democratic Party candidate for vice president in the 2024 United States presidential election.

Prior to her husband's election as governor of Minnesota, Walz worked for over two decades in the public school system as an English teacher. Her first teaching job was in Alliance, Nebraska, where she met her future husband and fellow educator, Tim Walz. In 1996, she and Walz moved to her native Minnesota where they both taught in the Mankato public schools. Retiring and moving to Saint Paul when her husband became governor in 2019, she is the only first lady in Minnesota's history to have an office in the Minnesota State Capitol. Walz oversees a policy portfolio focusing on education, corrections, and gun control legislation.

== Early life and education ==
Gwen Whipple was born in 1966 in Glencoe, Minnesota, and was raised in Ivanhoe, Minnesota. She is the daughter of Val and Linnea "Linn" (née Wacker) Whipple. Her father worked as an insurance agent who owned Whipple Insurance Agency in Ivanhoe MN, as well as a basketball coach. Her mother was a Physical Education teacher and served as the community education director for a school district. She has three sisters: Maribeth Sagmoe, Karrie Nations, and Heidi Ohlmann.

She earned a bachelor of arts degree at Gustavus Adolphus College and a master's degree at Minnesota State University.

== Career and public life ==
After graduating from college, Walz relocated to western Nebraska and began a career as an English teacher. From 2004 to 2018, she was the assessment coordinator for the Mankato Area Public Schools. Walz joined Augsburg University in 2019 as a special assistant to the president Paul C. Pribbenow working twenty hours a week on various projects, including one that helped train East African immigrant teachers. In 2019, she worked on government relations and public service career projects for students at Augsburg University.

Together with her husband, Walz established Educational Travel Adventures Inc., an organization that offered annual trips for students to China. She has worked with the Bard Prison Initiative to help incarcerated people afford higher education opportunities.

Walz became First Lady of Minnesota upon her husband taking office as governor in 2019. She has had an active and public role in shaping state policies. Walz has given public speeches in favor of restoring voting rights to convicted felons, which Minnesota did under her husband's administration in 2023, and has advocated for gun control legislation. She is the only First Lady of Minnesota to have an office in the Minnesota State Capitol. Walz manages a policy portfolio including education and corrections.

In 2024, her husband was announced as the Democratic vice presidential candidate for the 2024 United States presidential election.

Walz is on the board of the 2026 Special Olympics USA Games.

== Personal life ==
Walz is Lutheran. She married Tim Walz on June 4, 1994, when both were working as teachers. They have two children. She underwent intrauterine insemination before giving birth to their daughter and first child, Hope, in 2001; a second child, Gus, followed in 2006.

== Notes ==
Honorary titles
Vacant Title last held by Mary Pawlenty	First Lady of Minnesota; 2019–present	Current holder
