= List of first ladies and gentlemen of Minnesota =

Spouse of the Governor of Minnesota

First Lady of Minnesota

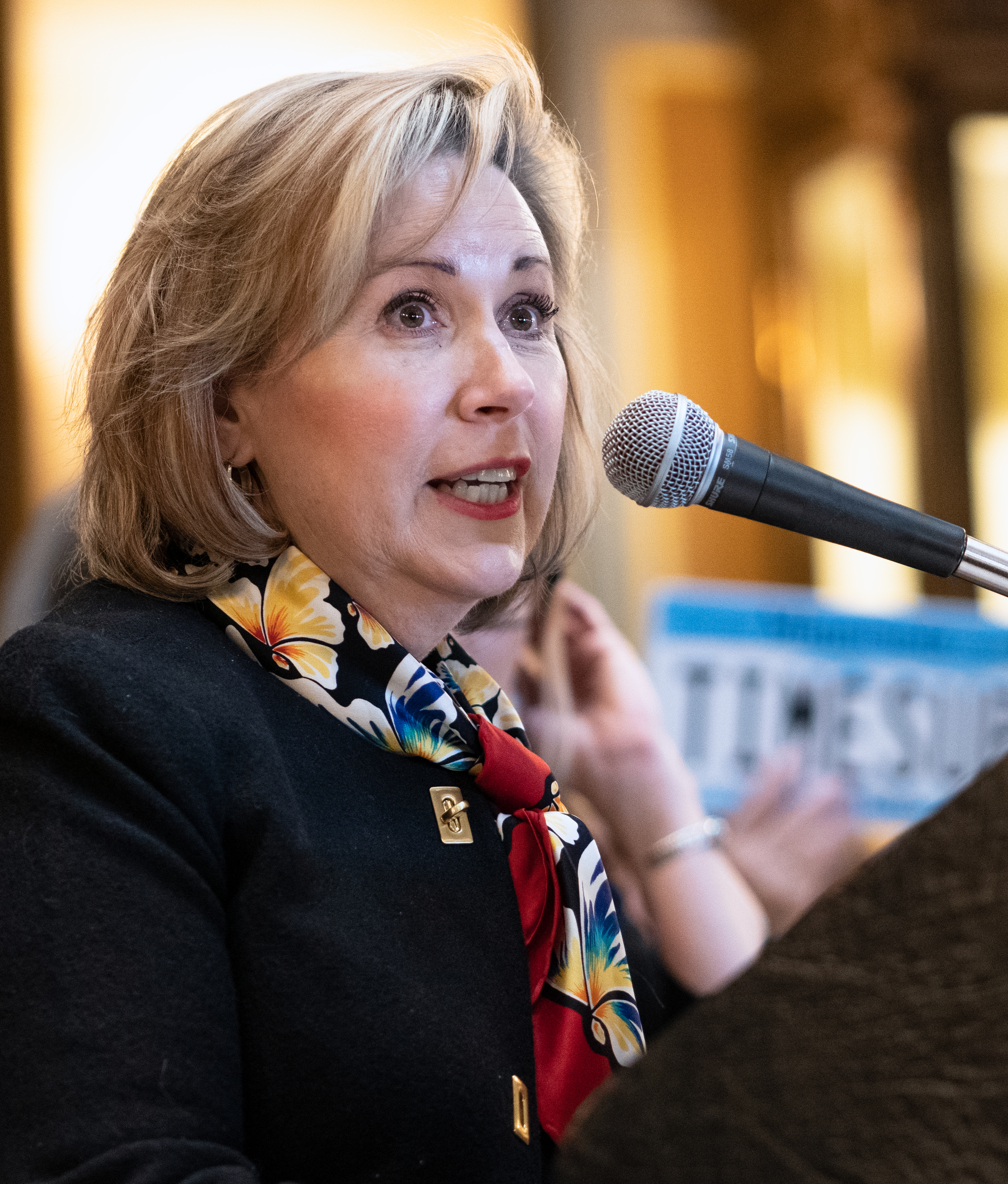
- Current; Gwen Walz since January 7, 2019
- Inaugural holder: Sarah Jane Sibley
- Formation: May 24, 1858
- Website: First Lady of Minnesota

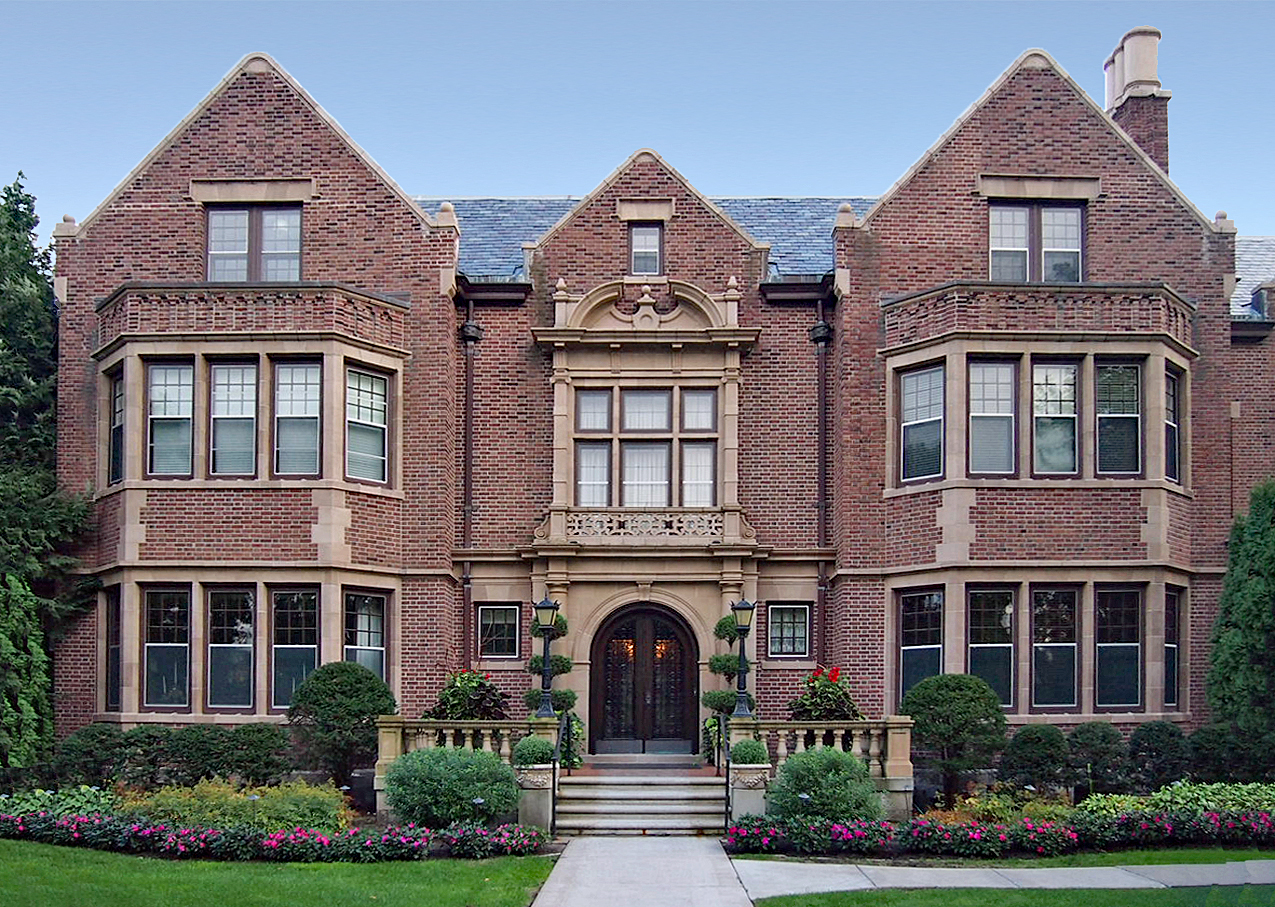
The Minnesota Governor's Mansion typically also is the residence of the First Spouse

The first lady or first gentleman of Minnesota is an honorary title granted to the spouse of the governor of Minnesota.

The current first lady is Gwen Walz, wife of Governor Tim Walz. John Bessler, the husband of Governor-elect Amy Klobuchar, will become the first first gentleman of Minnesota when he assumes the role.

== First spouses of Minnesota ==
| Name | Image | Term in office | Birth-Death | Spouse of | Notes |
|---|---|---|---|---|---|
| Sarah Sibley | | 1858-1860 | 1823-1869 | Henry Sibley | |
| Anna Earl Jenks Ramsey | | 1860-1863 | 1826-1884 | Alexander Ramsey | |
| Ruth Livingston Swift | | 1863-1864 | 1827-1881 | Henry Swift | |
| Margaret Funk Miller | | 1864-1866 | 1816-1879 | Stephen Miller | |
| Abby Langford Marshall | | 1866-1870 | 1826-1893 | William Marshall | |
| Mary Angelina "Lena" Morrill Austin | | 1870-1874 | 1835-1910 | Horace Austin | |
| Laura Bowman Davis | | 1874-1876 | c.1839-Unknown | Cushman Davis | |
| Mahala Fisk Pillsbury | | 1876-1882 | 1832-1910 | John S. Pillsbury | |
| Amelia Thomas Hubbard | | 1882-1887 | 1843-1923 | Lucius Hubbard | Born in Canada |
| Mary Elizabeth Wilson McGill | | 1887-1889 | 1853-1932 | Andrew McGill | |
| Laura Hancock Merriam | | 1889-1893 | 1850-1943 | William Merriam | |
| Nicolina Jacobsen Nelson | | 1893-1895 | 1846-1922 | Knute Nelson | Born in Norway |
| Addie Barton Clough | | 1895-1899 | 1850-1929 | D.M. Clough | |
| Alice Shepard Lind | | 1899-1901 | 1859-1942 | John Lind | |
| Ruth Hall Van Sant | | 1901-1905 | 1848-1928 | Samuel Van Sant | |
| Elinore "Nora" Preston Johnson | | 1905-1909 | c.1874-1955 | John Johnson | |
| Adele O. M. Koke Eberhart | | 1909-1915 | 1874-1945 | A.O. Eberhart | First First Lady born in Minnesota. |
| Vacant | | 1915-1915 | | Winfield Scott Hammond | Governor Hammond was not married. |
| Mary Louise Cross Burnquist | | 1915-1921 | 1880-1966 | J.A.A. Burnquist | |
| Idelle Louise Haugen Preus | | 1921-1925 | 1884-1968 | J.A.O. Preus | |
| Ruth E. Donaldson Christianson | | 1925-1931 | 1886-1944 | Theodore Christianson | |
| Ada A. Krejci Olson | | 1931-1936 | 1893-1969 | Floyd B. Olson | |
| Medora B. Grandprey Petersen | | 1936-1937 | 1896-1997 | Hjalmar Petersen | |
| Frances Lillian Miller Benson | | 1937-1939 | 1896-1990 | Elmer Benson | |
| Esther G. Glewwe Stassen | | 1939-1943 | 1906-2000 | Harold Stassen | Worked as a secretary in a downtown St. Paul law office |
| Myrtle Ennor Oliver Thye | | 1943-1947 | 1895-1972 | Edward Thye | |
| Irene Annet Engdahl Youngdahl | | 1947-1951 | 1896-1992 | Luther Youngdahl | |
| Lillian Otterstad Anderson | | 1951-1955 | 1913-1998 | C. Elmer Anderson | |
| Jane C. Shields Freeman | | 1955-1961 | 1921-2018 | Orville Freeman | |
| Eleanor A. Johnson Andersen | | 1961-1963 | 1911-2011 | Elmer Andersen | |
| Florence Boedeker Rolvaag | | 1963-1967 | 1921-1983 | Karl Rolvaag | Worked as a secretary at the literary journal "Southwestern Review" and taught at a business school |
| Iantha Powrie LeVander | | 1967-1971 | 1913-2009 | Harold LeVander | Served as a Republican National Committeewoman in the mid-1970s and program chair of the 1976 Republican National Convention. |
| Mary Christine McKee Anderson | | 1971-1976 | 1939-2018 | Wendell Anderson | Architect |
| Delores "Lola" Helen Simich Perpich | | 1976-1979 | 1931-2025 | Rudy Perpich | Renovated the Minnesota Governor's Residence and opened the residence to the public for the first time. |
| Gretchen Marie Hansen Quie | | 1979-1983 | 1927-2015 | Al Quie | |
| Delores "Lola" Helen Simich Perpich | | 1983-1991 | 1931-2025 | Rudy Perpich | |
| Susan Shepard Carlson | | 1991-1999 | 1949- | Arne Carlson | |
| Theresa "Terry" Masters Janos "Ventura" | | 1999-2003 | 1955- | Jesse Ventura | |
| Mary Pawlenty | | 2003-2011 | 1961- | Tim Pawlenty | State court judge |
| Vacant | | 2011-2019 | | Mark Dayton | Governor Dayton was unmarried while governor |
| Gwen Walz | | 2019–present | 1966- | Tim Walz | |
| John Bessler | | designate, scheduled to assume role on January 4 2027 | 1967– | Amy Klobuchar | |

== See also ==
- List of governors of Minnesota
