= Harmony, Minnesota =

City in Minnesota, United States

Harmony
- City
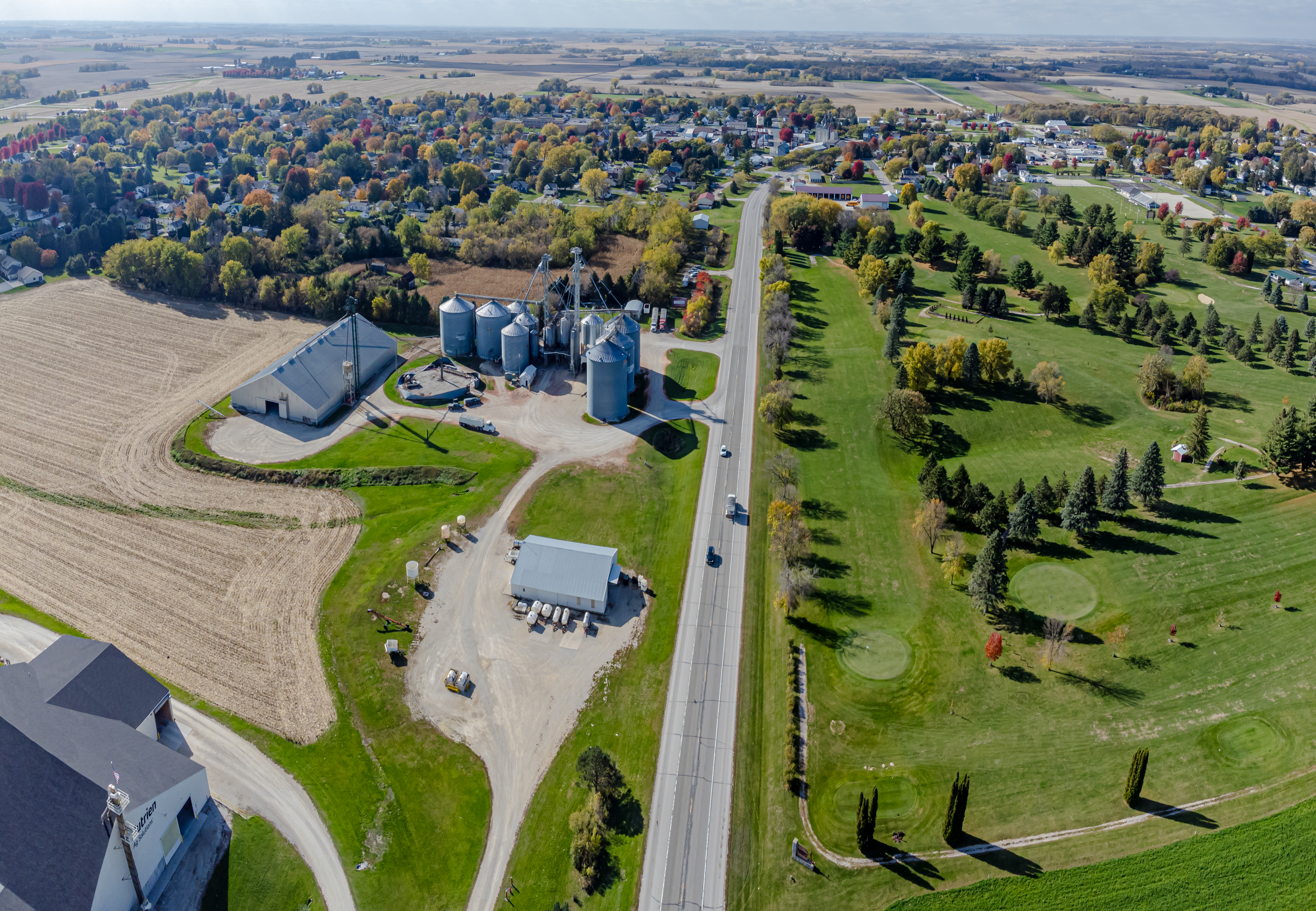
- Motto: "Biggest Little Town in Southern Minnesota"
- Location of Harmony, Minnesota
- Coordinates: 43°33′13″N 92°00′27″W
- Country: United States
- State: Minnesota
- County: Fillmore

Area
  - Total: 1.12 sq mi (2.89 km^{2})
  - Land: 1.12 sq mi (2.89 km^{2})
  - Water: 0 sq mi (0.00 km^{2})
- Elevation: 1,352 ft (412 m)

Population (2020)
  - Total: 1,043
  - Density: 935.5/sq mi (361.19/km^{2})
- Time zone: UTC-6 (Central (CST))
  - Summer (DST): UTC-5 (CDT)
- ZIP code: 55939
- Area code: 507
- FIPS code: 27-27188
- GNIS feature ID: 2394299
- Website: https://harmonymn.gov/

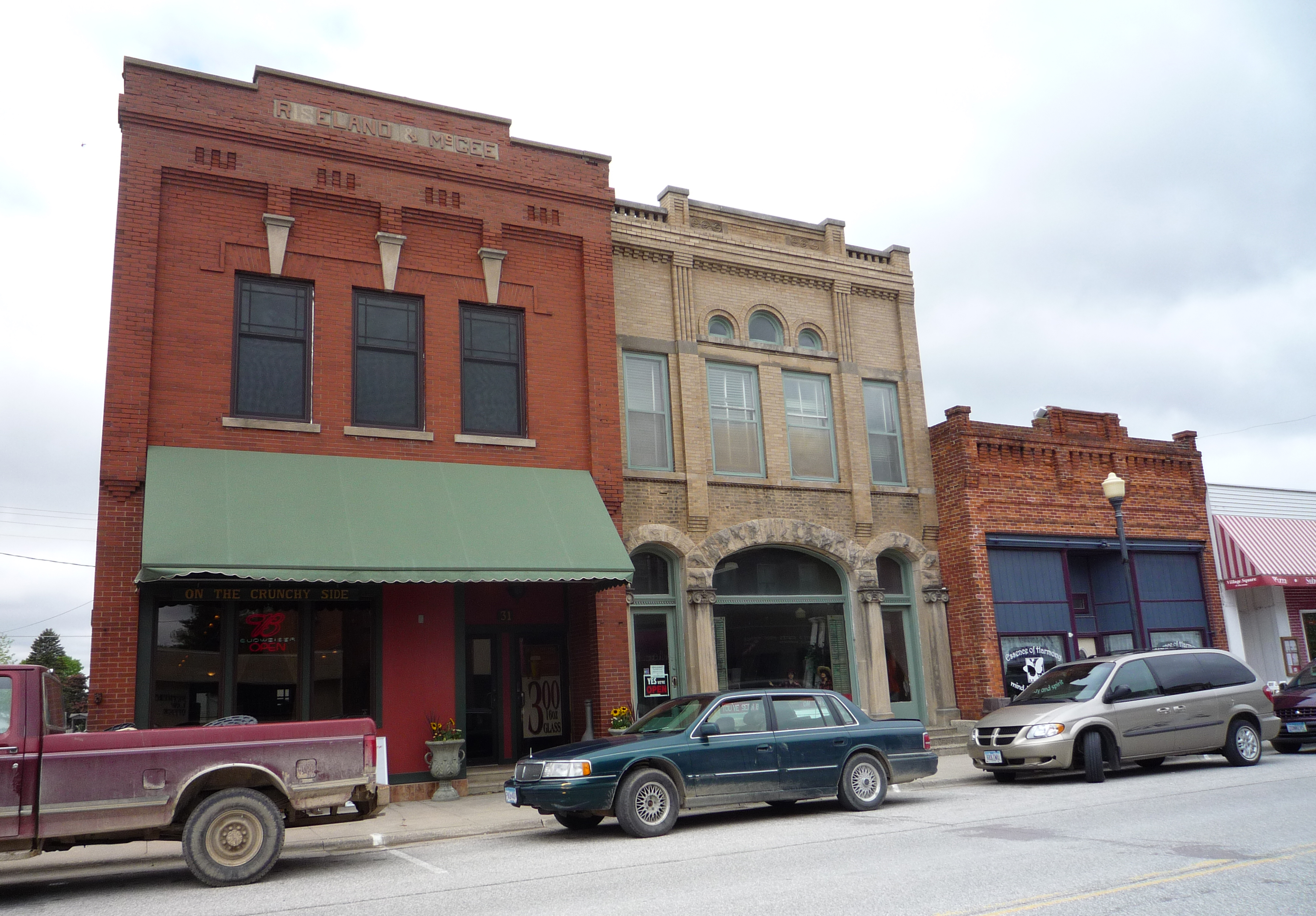
Main Avenue, Harmony

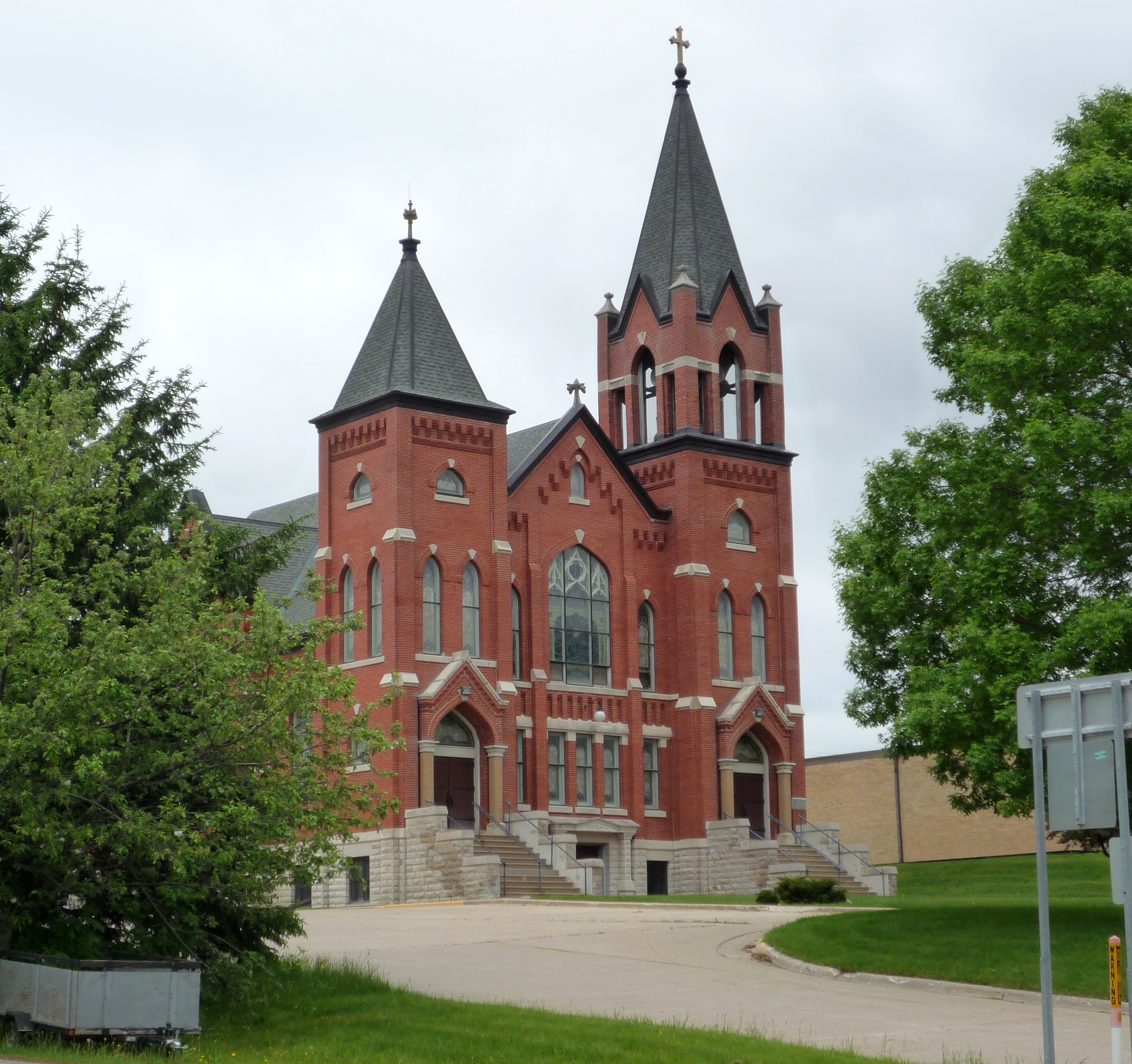
Greenfield Lutheran Church

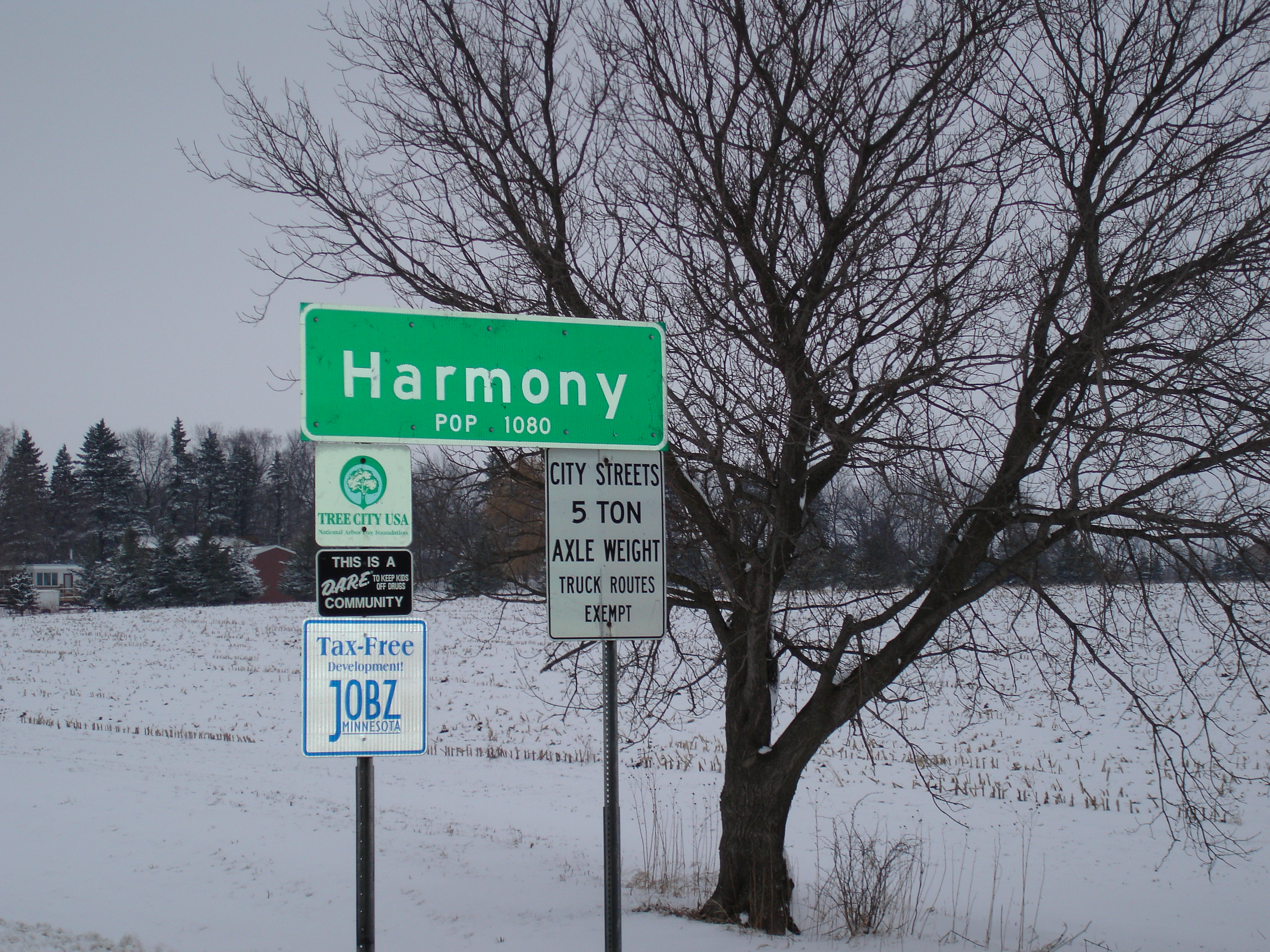
Harmony, Minnesota signpost

Harmony is a city in Fillmore County, Minnesota, United States. As of the 2020 census, Harmony had a population of 1,043. The town bills itself as the "Biggest Little Town in Southern Minnesota" and features the largest Amish community in the state.

== History ==
Harmony was founded in 1880.

Amish came to Fillmore County in 1974 from Ohio, seeking cheaper land.

== Geography ==
Harmony is located at 43°33′37″N 92°0′35″W. According to the United States Census Bureau, the city has a total area of 1.13 square miles (2.93 km^{2}), all of it land.

U.S. Highway 52 and Minnesota Highway 139 are two of the main routes in the community.

== Demographics ==
Historical population
Census	Pop.	Note	%±
1900	517		—
1910	655		26.7%
1920	718		9.6%
1930	821		14.3%
1940	890		8.4%
1950	1,022		14.8%
1960	1,214		18.8%
1970	1,130		−6.9%
1980	1,133		0.3%
1990	1,081		−4.6%
2000	1,080		−0.1%
2010	1,020		−5.6%
2020	1,043		2.3%
U.S. Decennial Census

=== 2010 census ===
As of the census of 2010, there were 1,020 people, 479 households, and 273 families living in the city. The population density was 902.7 inhabitants per square mile (348.5/km^{2}). There were 541 housing units at an average density of 478.8 per square mile (184.9/km^{2}). The racial makeup of the city was 98.1% White, 0.3% African American, 0.2% Native American, 0.2% Asian, and 1.2% from two or more races. Hispanic or Latino of any race were 1.0% of the population.

There were 479 households, of which 20.5% had children under the age of 18 living with them, 47.8% were married couples living together, 6.3% had a female householder with no husband present, 2.9% had a male householder with no wife present, and 43.0% were non-families. 38.8% of all households were made up of individuals, and 22.7% had someone living alone who was 65 years of age or older. The average household size was 2.02 and the average family size was 2.63.

The median age in the city was 53.3 years. 17.4% of residents were under the age of 18; 4.7% were between the ages of 18 and 24; 18.1% were from 25 to 44; 26.5% were from 45 to 64; and 33.2% were 65 years of age or older. The gender makeup of the city was 47.9% male and 52.1% female.

=== 2000 census ===
As of the census of 2000, there were 1,080 people, 477 households, and 299 families living in the city. The population density was 948.9 inhabitants per square mile (366.4/km^{2}). There were 500 housing units at an average density of 439.3 per square mile (169.6/km^{2}). The racial makeup of the city was 98.98% White, 0.19% African American, 0.09% Asian, 0.46% from other races, and 0.28% from two or more races. Hispanic or Latino of any race were 0.56% of the population.

There were 477 households, out of which 24.5% had children under the age of 18 living with them, 51.8% were married couples living together, 10.1% had a female householder with no husband present, and 37.3% were non-families. 34.4% of all households were made up of individuals, and 19.7% had someone living alone who was 65 years of age or older. The average household size was 2.16 and the average family size was 2.75.

In the city the population was spread out, with 20.6% under the age of 18, 5.0% from 18 to 24, 21.2% from 25 to 44, 22.6% from 45 to 64, and 30.6% who were 65 years of age or older. The median age was 48 years. For every 100 females there were 87.5 males. For every 100 females age 18 and over, there were 77.1 males.

The median income for a household in the city was $30,260, and the median income for a family was $38,750. Males had a median income of $27,188 versus $22,768 for females. The per capita income for the city was $16,859. About 8.4% of families and 9.8% of the population were below the poverty line, including 7.9% of those under age 18 and 16.0% of those age 65 or over.

== Arts and culture ==
=== Museums and other points of interest ===
The Amish are the focal point of local tourism & shopping with many Amish owned businesses in the surrounding area.

The JEM Theatre, a movie theater built in 1940, is the only one operating in Fillmore County. There are three antique shops in town. Generations of Harmony- A 50 dealer mall on hwy 52- North side of town. OLD Crow Antiques on hwy 52/corner of Main-A house full of primitives & garden decor(w/a Furniture warehouse on Main st).I Love Antiques-on South Main across from the bank- a traditional antique store.

Nearby Niagara Cave is one of the largest caves in the Midwest, and is rated among the top 10 best caves by various nationally recognized organizations. Niagara Cave features a 60-foot (18 m) waterfall in the largest room in the cave, 200 feet below ground level. It also has ancient fossils embedded in limestone that predate the dinosaurs, and a wedding chapel where there have been over 400 weddings performed since it opened. Outside the cave there is a gift shop, 10 acres (40,000 m^{2}) of picnic grounds, an 18-hole mini golf course, and a sluice box where people can mine for gems and fossils. The cave, containing 5 miles of passageways, was accidentally discovered in 1926 by a local pig farmer. It has been open to the public since 1933.

Harmony is the southern terminus of the Harmony-Preston Valley segment of the Blufflands State Trail. The Harmony-Preston State Trail connects the town to the renowned Root River Trail system.

=== Amish ===
In 1974, Amish from Wayne County, Ohio started a new settlement near Harmony. They belong to the Swartzentruber Amish affiliation, which are much more conservative than most other of the Old Order Amish affiliations. The total population of the Amish community near Harmony is about 1000 people. Besides farming they operate low-tech businesses, that produce and sell furniture, baskets, rugs, quilts, jams, baked goods and cashew crunch. The Amish are the focal point of local tourism attraction and shopping, with many Amish-owned businesses in the surrounding area.

== Education ==
Fillmore Central School District (#2198) is a public district that has one school in Harmony, the High School (7-12th grade). The Elementary (PK-4th grade) and the Middle School (5-6th grade) are located in nearby Preston. Fillmore Central's total enrollment for the school years of 2005-2006 are 641 students.

The Harmony Public Library is the public library in Harmony. It is a member of Southeastern Libraries Cooperating, the SE Minnesota library region.

== Notable people ==
- Tami Hoag, author
- Ole N. Thundale, merchant, mayor, and member of the Minnesota House of Representatives

== See also ==
- Canton, Minnesota
