= Upper Iowa Conference =

Iowa High School athletic conference

- Conference: IHSAA / IGHSAU
- Founded: 1938
- Sports fielded: 15
- No. of teams: 12
- Region: Northeast Iowa
- Website: https://www.upperiowaconference.org/

The Upper Iowa Conference is a high school athletic conference in Iowa made up of 1A, 2A, and 3A schools in northeastern Iowa. It is a twelve-team league split into 2 divisions, “Big” and “Small” as of the 2025-2026 school year. It has the current sports: volleyball, boys and girls basketball, golf, cross country, boys and girls track and field, baseball, softball, and wrestling. Clayton Ridge, North Fayette Valley, Postville, and MFL MarMac compete in soccer.

== History ==
The conference was formed in 1938 by West Union of the Northeast Iowa Conference, Monona, Postville, Maynard, Sumner, and Fayette school districts. Waukon and Elkader would join in 1940. Monona would leave the following year. Elgin joined in 1949, and would consolidate with Clermont to form Clermont-Elgin in 1954. In 1958, Maynard would be renamed West Central and Clermont-Elgin would consolidate again, this time with Wadena to form Valley-CEW. West Union would consolidate with Hawkeye and Alpha in 1960 to form North Fayette; the high school was more commonly known as North High.

After Waukon left to join larger schools in the Northeast Iowa Conference in 1968, they were replaced by M-F-L of Monona, who was a part of the Upper Mississippi Conference. Elkader would rename themselves to Central Elkader in 1969. North High and Fayette also merged to become North Fayette High School in 1986.

Eventually, in 1987, with the fall of the Upper Mississippi Conference, Kee High School and Mar-Mac opted to join the Upper Iowa Conference. Guttenberg would join the same year, leaving the Mid-East Conference. Wapsie Valley and Turkey Valley also joined the league after disbanding the Cedar-Waspie Conference, pushing membership to 13. M-F-L and Mar-Mac would consolidate in 1992 and North Winneshiek would be added to the conference in 1994. Garnavillo also joined following the fall of the Mid-East Conference. In 1998, Wapsie Valley in Fairbank left for the NICL (North Iowa Cedar League).

Garnavillo and Guttenberg merged districts, becoming Clayton Ridge in 1999. North Winneshiek closed its high school upon entering into a whole-grade sharing agreement with Decorah for grades 9–12 in 2002. Sumner consolidates with Fredericksburg, who was a part of the Iowa Star Conference, to form Sumner-Fredericksburg in 2004. In 2012 the Upper Iowa Conference expanded south and added Starmont and Edgewood–Colesburg (Ed-Co). In 2013 North Fayette and Valley-CEW decided to go into a whole-grade sharing agreement, bringing the total of teams in the conference down to 12. In the 2014–15 school year, Sumner-Fredericksburg began to competing in the North Iowa Cedar League, dropping the number of schools in the conference to 11.

Beginning in the 2017–18 school year Edgewood–Colesburg left the UIC to return to its original conference, the Tri-Rivers Conference. In 2018-19, Starmont left to join Edgewood-Colesburg in the Tri-Rivers Conference. The departure of the two schools dropped the total number of Upper Iowa Conference schools to nine.

Beginning in the 2025-2026 school year, Crestwood, New Hampton, and Waukon joined the Upper Iowa Conference after the Northeast Iowa Conference disbanded. There are currently two divisions (Big and Small).

== Members ==
Big School Division

School name	Location	Mascot	Colors	2026-2027 BEDS
Crestwood	Cresco	Cadets		242
MFL MarMac	Monona	Bulldogs		190
New Hampton	New Hampton	Chickasaws		225
North Fayette Valley	West Union	TigerHawks		227
South Winneshiek	Calmar	Warriors		157
Waukon	Waukon	Indians		278

Small School Division

School name	Location	Mascot	Colors	2026-2027 BEDS
Central	Elkader	Warriors		87
Clayton Ridge	Guttenberg	Eagles		133
Eastern Allamakee	Lansing	Kee Hawks		55
Postville	Postville	Pirates		157
Turkey Valley	Jackson Junction	Trojans		80
West Central	Maynard	Blue Devils		77
