= Waukon High School =

Public secondary school in Waukon, Iowa, United States

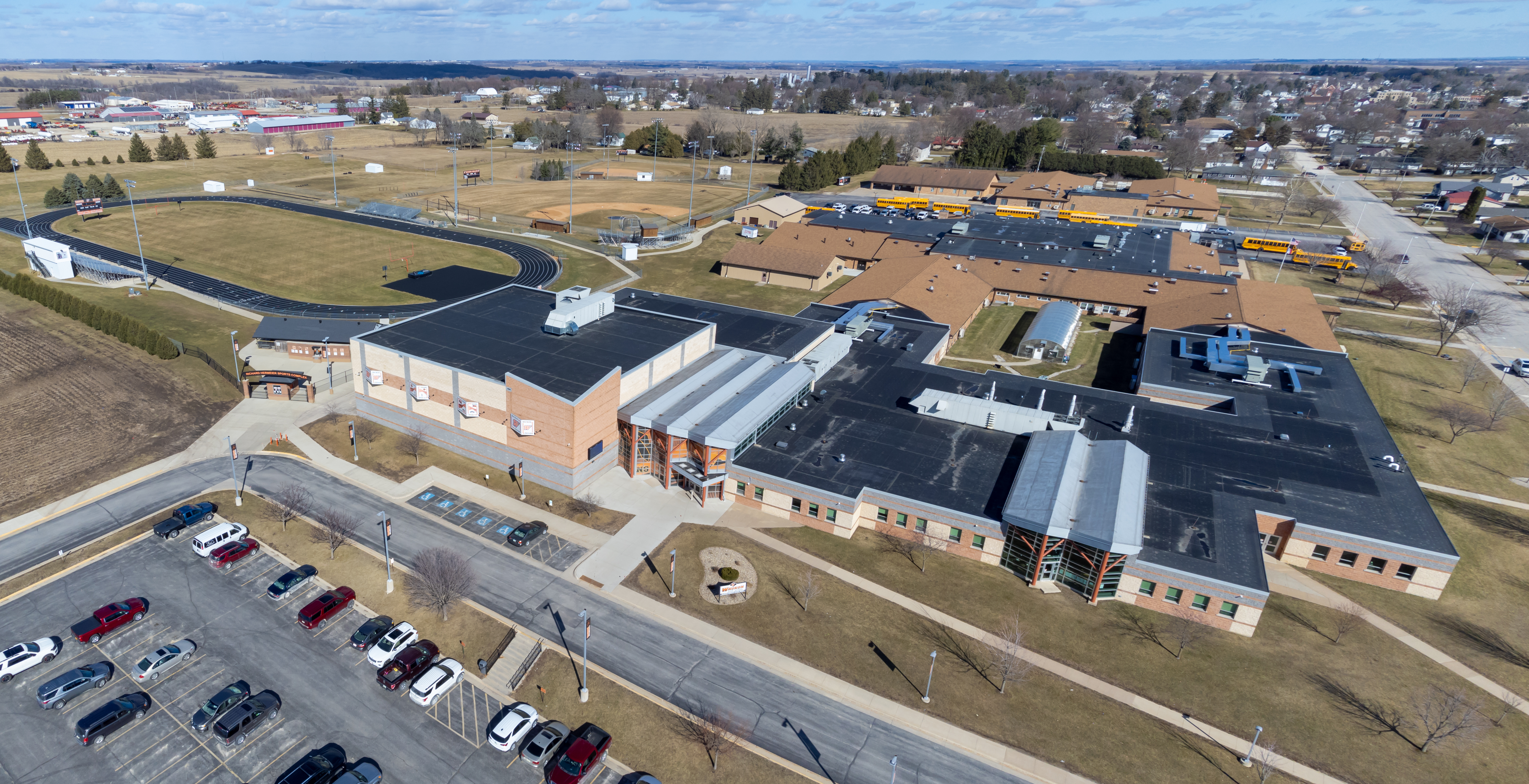

Location
- 1059 3rd Ave. N.W. Waukon, IA 52172; 43.272°N 91.491°W

Information
- Type: Public secondary
- Principal: Jennifer Garin
- Teaching staff: 24.99 (FTE)
- Grades: 9-12
- Enrollment: 378 (2023-2024)
- Student to teacher ratio: 15.13
- Colors: Black and Orange
- Athletics conference: Upper Iowa (1940-1968; 2025-present); Northeast Iowa (1968-2025)
- Mascot: Indians
- Website: whs.allamakee.k12.ia.us

Waukon High School is a public high school located in the city of Waukon, Iowa, United States. It is the only high school in the Allamakee Community School District and serves many of the surrounding towns, including: Harpers Ferry, Waterville, and Dorchester.

== 2007 Renovation ==
In 2007, a brand new $16 million addition was built onto the Senior High building.

Previously Jr. High students attended a building separate from the Senior High. Both Jr. High and Senior High students will now use the new addition to the school.

Waukon Wellness Center was also built and opened across the street from the school. Matt Hoover, season two winner of NBC's The Biggest Loser, spoke at the grand opening.

== Athletics ==
The athletic teams of Waukon High School are known as the Indians. The name "Indians" is named in honor of Waukon Decorah, a chief of what is now known as the Ho-Chunk nation (formerly the Winnebago tribe).

The Indians compete in the Upper Iowa Conference Conference in the following sports:

- Cross Country
  - Boys' 7-time Class 2A State Champions (1993, 1995, 1996, 1997, 1998, 1999, 2002)
  - Girls' 1993 Class 2A State Champions
- Volleyball
- Football
  - 2-time Class 2A State Champions (2017, 2020)
- Basketball
  - Girls' 2004 Class 3A State Champions
- Wrestling
- Bowling
- Track and Field
- Golf
- Baseball
- Softball

== Notable alumni ==
- Mark Farley, former head football coach at the University of Northern Iowa
- Parker Hesse, professional football player and former player for University of Iowa
- Edward P. Ney, physicist and physics professor at the University of Minnesota

== See also ==
- List of high schools in Iowa
