= Lansing Township =

Lansing Township may refer to:

- Lansing Township, Allamakee County, Iowa
- Lansing Charter Township, Michigan
- Lansing Township, Mower County, Minnesota
- Lansing Township, Towner County, North Dakota, in Towner County, North Dakota
- Lansing Township, Brown County, South Dakota, in Brown County, South Dakota
