= Allamakee Community School District =

Public school district in Waukon, Iowa, United States

Coordinates: 43.272123°N 91.490993°W

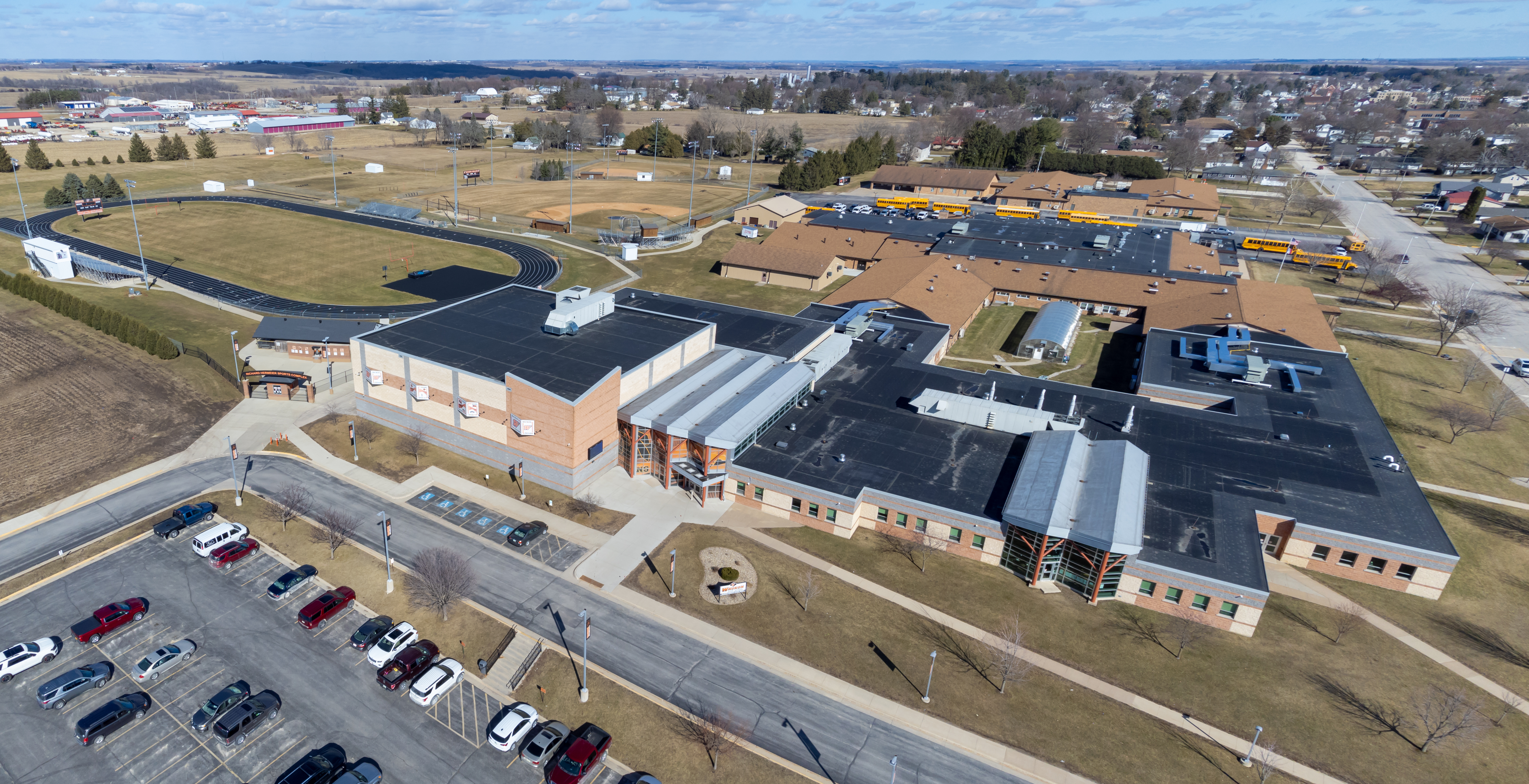
- Waukon high school, middle, and elementary

Location
- Waukon, Iowa Allamakee County and Winneshiek County United States
- Coordinates: 43.272123, -91.490993

District information
- Type: Local school district
- Grades: K–12
- Superintendent: Jay Mathis
- Schools: 4
- Budget: $17,139,000 (2020-21)
- NCES District ID: 1903390

Students and staff
- Students: 1164 (2022-23)
- Teachers: 80.29 FTE
- Staff: 87.13 FTE
- Student–teacher ratio: 14.50
- Athletic conference: Northeast Iowa Conference

Other information
- Website: allamakee.k12.ia.us

The Allamakee Community School District (also known as ACSD) is a public school district based in the city of Waukon in Allamakee County, Iowa, United States. The district is mainly in Allamakee County, with a small portion in Winneshiek County. It serves the cities of Waukon, Harpers Ferry, and Waterville, and the surrounding rural areas.

== History ==
Because of budget cuts, 26 teachers' positions were terminated in 2009.

Jay Mathis was hired as Superintendent in 2018. Mathis is an alumnus of the district, and previously served as Superintendent at Eldora–New Providence Community School District.

== List of schools ==
The district operates four schools, all in Waukon:

- East Campus Elementary School
- West Campus Elementary School
- Waukon Middle School
- Waukon High School

== See also ==
- List of school districts in Iowa
