= Eastern Allamakee Community School District =

Public school district in Lansing, Iowa, United States

Location
- Lansing, Iowa Allamakee County United States
- Coordinates: 43.36047°N 91.22177°W

District information
- Type: Local school district
- Grades: K-12
- Superintendent: Dr. Dale Crozier
- Schools: 3
- Budget: $5,980,000 (2020-21)
- NCES District ID: 1910410

Students and staff
- Students: 330 (2022-23)
- Teachers: 29.30 FTE
- Staff: 41.37 FTE
- Student–teacher ratio: 11.26
- Athletic conference: Upper Iowa Conference
- District mascot: Kee-Hawk
- Colors: Purple, White & Silver

Other information
- Website: www.keeschools.com

The Eastern Allamakee Community School District is a public school district based in the city of Lansing, Iowa.

The district is completely within Allamakee County. It serves the city of Lansing, and the surrounding rural areas.

== List of Schools ==
The district operates three schools:

- New Albin Elementary School
- Lansing Middle School
- Kee High School

== See also ==
- List of school districts in Iowa
