= Crestwood Secondary School (Iowa) =

Public secondary school in Cresco, Iowa, United States

Coordinates: 43.3747°N 92.1031°W

Location
- 1000 Schroder Drive; Cresco, IA 52136

Information
- Motto: Opportunity, Challenge, Success
- Established: 1960
- Superintendent: Theodore “Ted” Ihns
- Principal: Chris Rogne
- Teaching staff: 41.07 (FTE)
- Grades: 7–12
- Enrollment: 509 (2023-2024)
- Student to teacher ratio: 12.39
- Colors: Blue and White
- Athletics conference: Northeast Iowa Conference
- Mascot: Cadet
- Website: Crestwood Secondary School

Crestwood Secondary School is a public high school, located in Cresco, Howard County, in northeast Iowa. Crestwood is the high school for the Howard–Winneshiek Community School District. It serves students from the cities of Cresco, Chester, Lime Springs, Elma, and Ridgeway. Students from nearby Protivin can choose to attend this school as well. The school district was formed in 1960 by combining the independent school districts and high schools of Cresco, Chester, Elma, Lime Springs, and Ridgeway. The current high school building was built in 1969.

== Academic design ==
The school is developing a student centered learning environment that is addressing grading systems, gaps in knowledge, and student pacing. Students, teachers, community members, school board, post-secondary education, and administrators are developing this system. Developing young people with the skill sets necessary for careers can be seen through this Competency Based Education system. Traits of the CBE system are:

- Students advance upon proficiency
- Competencies include explicit, measurable, and transferable learning
- Assessment is meaningful and a positive learning experience for students
- Students receive rapid, differentiated support based on their individual learning needs
- Learning outcomes emphasize competencies that include application and creation of knowledge along with development of important skills and dispositions

== Coursework ==
Dual Credit Coursework

Crestwood High School offers the following to students through Northeast Iowa Community College (NICC):

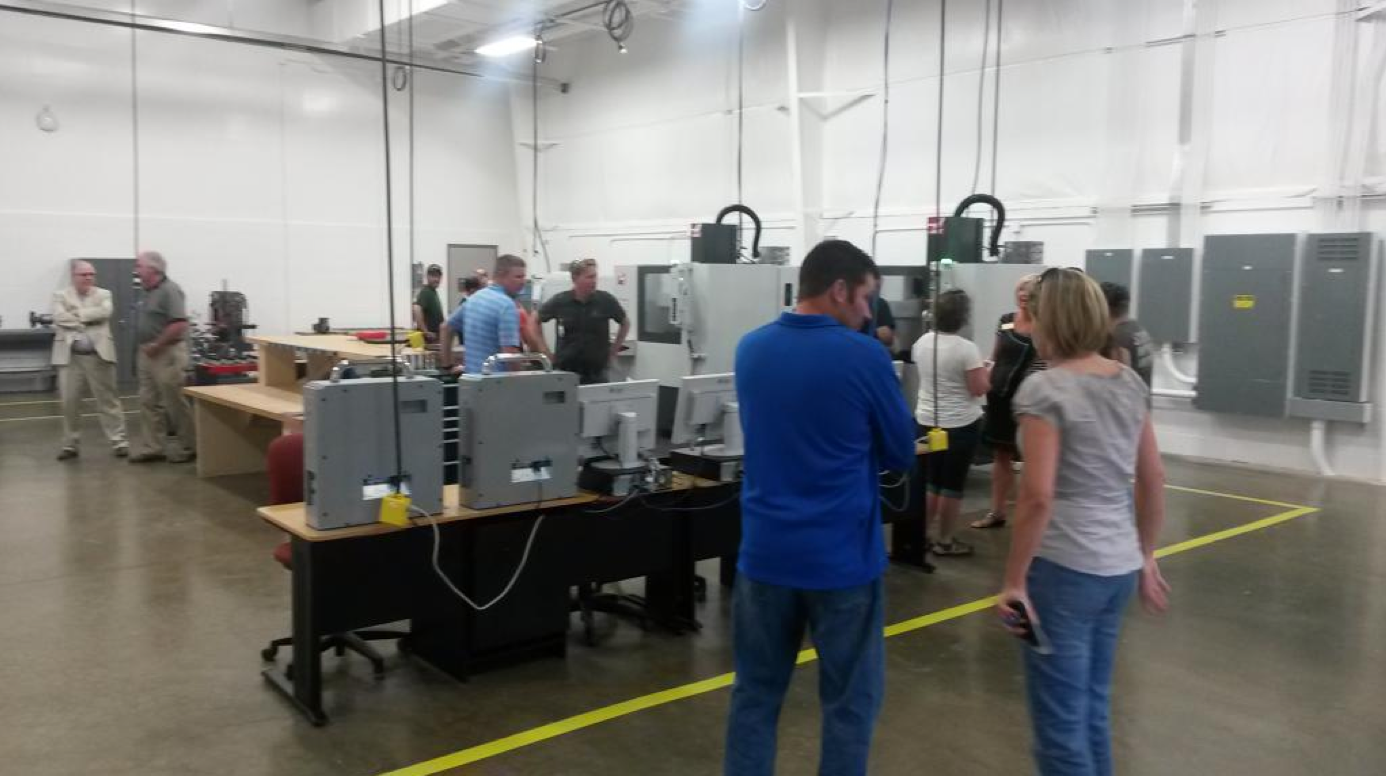
NICC CNC Lab

- Opportunities for post-secondary credit on campus
  - 33 unique courses with 1588 college credits during the 2013–14 school year
  - These college credits saved parents nearly $687,662 in college expenses
  - On average, this is a savings of over $4,117 per student per year
- College-level curriculum including:
  - Advanced Placement (AP)
  - Dual Credit Classes
  - CNC/Advanced Manufacturing
  - Certification Programs
  - Project Lead The Way (PLTW)

== Athletics ==
Crestwood is a founding member of the Northeast Iowa Conference (as Cresco), and the Cadets participate in the following sports:

- Cross country
- Volleyball
- Football
- Basketball
- Wrestling
  - 1986 class 3A state champions
- Track and Field
  - Boys' 2005 class 3A state champions
- Golf
- Baseball
- Softball

== See also ==
- List of high schools in Iowa
