= Howard–Winneshiek Community School District =

Public school district in Cresco, Iowa, United States

Coordinates: 43.374766°N 92.102207°W

Location
- Cresco, Iowa Howard, Winneshiek, and Chickasaw counties United States
- Coordinates: 43.374766, -92.102207

District information
- Type: Local school district
- Grades: K–12
- Established: 1960
- Superintendent: Ted Ihns
- Schools: 3
- Budget: $19,020,000 (2020-21)
- NCES District ID: 1914280

Students and staff
- Students: 1060 (2022-23)
- Teachers: 85.04 FTE
- Staff: 85.75 FTE
- Student–teacher ratio: 12.46
- Athletic conference: Northeast Iowa
- District mascot: Cadets
- Colors: Blue and White

Other information
- Website: www.howard-winn.k12.ia.us

Howard–Winneshiek Community School District is a rural public school district headquartered in Cresco, Iowa.

It is mostly in Howard and Winneshiek counties, with a small section in Chickasaw County. It serves Cresco, Chester, Elma, Lime Springs, and Ridgeway. It has a total of 434 square miles (1,120 km^{2}) of land. Circa 2003, it was the third largest school district in the state in terms of land area.

== History ==
The district was formed from the merger of the Cresco, Lime Springs/Chester, Elma, and Ridgeway school districts, opening on July 1, 1960.

The high school was called Crestwood High School. Crestwood Elementary/Junior High School were also in Cresco, Lime Springs/Chester Elementary, in Lime Springs, and Elma Elementary, in Elma. For the 2014–15 school year, Elma Elementary will be preschool only. Lime Springs/Chester Elementary will only be a fourth-grade center; however, this will include every fourth-grader in the district (even those who would go to Crestwood Elementary, being bused to Lime Springs for class. Every other grade from Elma, Lime Springs, and Chester will be bussed to the Cresco center. This is all due in part to the ending of the"doubling up" classroom policy by the Howard–Winneshiek Community School District. Howard County is mostly rural. These counties are suffering from population decline, which also contributes to the changes. Also beginning with the 2014–15 school year, children in Elma will have the open enrollment choice: their parents be able to decide if they want them at Howard–Winn, or Riceville. The communities of Ridgeway and Protivin currently have an open enrollment policy that allows kids to go to Howard–Winneshiek. The policy in Ridgeway allows students to go to either Howard–Winneshiek or Decorah. In Protivin, it allows kids to either go to Howard–Winneshiek or Turkey Valley. In both communities, the children are split between choices about half. The Howard–Winneshiek community school district had an Elementary school in Ridgeway that closed its doors after the 2009–10 school year. Until 2010, Elma, Lime Springs/Chester, and Ridgeway were all K–6 centers. Beginning in 2010, children in Ridgeway obtained the open enrollment choice, and Elma and Lime Springs/Chester were cut back to K–5.

In 2013 John Carver, the superintendent, stated that the district needed to improve technology in the curriculum.

In 2014 a proposal to rename the district Crestwood Community School District was submitted. The district's advisory committee decided against it, and on a 4-1 basis the district board voted against the proposal.

== Schools ==
- Crestwood Secondary School
- Crestwood Elementary School
- Crestwood Early Childhood Center

Former schools:

- Cresco Fairrgrounds Elementary School (grades 1–3)
- Elma Elementary School (grades K–6)
- Lime Springs-Chester Elementary School (grades K–6)
- Ridgeway Elementary School (grades K–6)

In 2015 the district board voted to close the Lime Springs-Chester Elementary School on a 4-1 basis.

In 2013 the district board voted to close Elma Elementary School; Lime Springs-Chester remained open as the facilities in Cresco could not hold all grades.

In 2008 Ridgeway Elementary School closed. The Ridgeway city government bought the school in 2010. In 2011 Sherill and Jeff Ryan bought the school and converted it into a shrimp farm.

== Transportation ==
Circa 2003 fewer than 68% of the students traveled to/from school by bus.

== See also ==
- List of school districts in Iowa
