= Farmersburg =

Farmersburg is the name of two places in the United States:

- Farmersburg, Indiana
- Farmersburg, Iowa
- Elk County, Kansas, an abandoned town
