= List of NASCAR series =

== NASCAR racing series ==
NASCAR currently manages several racing series that range in vehicle styles and formats. There are four major national racing series which include the NASCAR Cup Series, NASCAR O'Reilly Auto Parts Series, NASCAR Craftsman Truck Series, and ARCA Menards Series, while the other series are divided up by region. Beginning in 2011, NASCAR began hosting eRacing leagues.

== List of NASCAR–sanctioned series ==
You can also help Wikipedia by adding references

=== Current Series ===
Series	Former name(s)	Division	Number of Points Races	Special Events	Major Sponsor(s)	Former Sponsors	Inaugural Season	Car Style	Region/Nation	Ref.
Cup Series	Strictly Stock	National	36	The Clash	Multiple	Winston	1949	Stock	United States	
Cup Series	Strictly Stock	National	36	Daytona Duels	Multiple	Nextel	1949	Stock	United States	
Cup Series	Grand National	National	36	All-Star Race	Multiple	Sprint	1949	Stock	United States	
Cup Series	Grand National	National	36	All-Star Race	Multiple	Monster Energy	1949	Stock	United States	
O'Reilly Auto Parts Series	Sportsman	National	33	Dash 4 Cash	O'Reilly Auto Parts	Budweiser	1950	Stock	United States	
O'Reilly Auto Parts Series	Late Model	National	33	Dash 4 Cash	O'Reilly Auto Parts	Busch	1950	Stock	United States	
O'Reilly Auto Parts Series	Grand National	National	33	Dash 4 Cash	O'Reilly Auto Parts	Nationwide	1950	Stock	United States	
O'Reilly Auto Parts Series	Grand National	National	33	Dash 4 Cash	O'Reilly Auto Parts	Xfinity	1950	Stock	United States	
Craftsman Truck Series	SuperTruck	National	23	Triple Truck Challenge	Craftsman	Camping World	1995	Pickup truck	United States	
Craftsman Truck Series	SuperTruck	National	23	Triple Truck Challenge	Craftsman	Gander Outdoors	1995	Pickup truck	United States	
ARCA Menards Series	MARC	National	20		Menards	RE/MAX	1953	Stock	United States	
ARCA Menards Series East/West	NASCAR K&N Pro Series East/West	Regional	8 (East)		Menards	K&N	1987	Stock	United States	
ARCA Menards Series East/West	NASCAR K&N Pro Series East/West	Regional	11 (West)		Menards	Camping World	1987	Stock	United States	
Whelen Modified Tour		Regional	16		Whelen	Winston	1948	Modified stock car	United States	
Whelen Modified Tour		Regional	16		Whelen	Featherlite	1948	Modified stock car	United States	
Advance Auto Parts Weekly Series	All-American	Local	Several		Advance Auto Parts	Winston	1985	Various	United States	
Advance Auto Parts Weekly Series	All-American	Local	Several		Advance Auto Parts	Dodge	1985	Various	United States	
Advance Auto Parts Weekly Series	All-American	Local	Several		Advance Auto Parts	Whelen	1985	Various	Canada	
Canada Series	CASCAR	National	13		None	Canadian Tire	1986	Pony car	Canada	
Canada Series	CASCAR	National	13		None	Pinty's	1986	Pony car	Canada	
Mexico Series		National	13		None	Corona	2004	Late model	Mexico	
Mexico Series		National	13		None	Toyota	2004	Late model	Mexico	
Mexico Series		National	13		None	Peak	2004	Late model	United States	
Challenge Series	NASCAR Mexico	National	14		None	FedEx	2006	V6	Mexico	
Challenge Series	Mini Stocks	National	14		None	FedEx	2006	V6	Mexico	
Challenge Series	Stock V6	National	14		None	FedEx	2006	V6	Mexico	
Euro Series	Euro-Racecar	International	13		None	Whelen	2009	Late model	(European Union) Europe	
Euro Series	Touring	International	13		None	Whelen	2009	Late model	(European Union) Europe	
Brasil Series	GT Sprint Race	National	9		None		2012	Stock	Brazil	
Coca-Cola iRacing Series		Online	20		Coca-Cola	Peak	2011	eRacing	International	
Ignite Series		Online	20		IRacing		2020	eRacing	International	
College iRacing Series		Online	3		NACE Starleague		2022	eRacing	United States	
International iRacing Series		Online	5		D-Box Technologies		2021	eRacing	International	

=== Former Series ===
Series	Former name(s)	Status	Division	Seasons managed	Car style	Nation	Ref.
ISCARS Dash Touring Series	Baby Grand	Defunct	National	1973–2003	Sedan	United States	
ISCARS Dash Touring Series	Goody's Dash	Defunct	National	1973–2003	Sedan	United States	
ISCARS Dash Touring Series	IPOWER Dash	Defunct	National	1973–2003	Sedan	United States	
Elite Division Midwest Series	RE/MAX Challenge Series	ASA Midwest Tour	Regional	1998–2006	Late model	United States	
Elite Division Northwest Series	NASCAR Northwest Tour	Defunct	Regional	1985–2006	Late model	United States	
Elite Division Southeast Series	Slim Jim All-Pro Series	Defunct	Regional	1991–2006	Late model	United States	
Elite Division Southwest Series	Featherlite Southwest Tour	SRL Southwest Tour	Regional	1986–2006	Late model	United States	
NASCAR North Tour	NASCAR Stroh's Tour; NASCAR Molson Tour; NASCAR Coors Tour	American Canadian Tour	Regional	1979–1985	Late model	United States; Canada	
Southern Modified Tour		Merged w/Whelen Modified Tour	Regional	2005–2016	Modified stock car	United States	
Australian Touring Series	AUSCAR	Defunct	National	1989–2002	Australian Touring Car	Australia	
Speedway Division		Defunct	National	1952–1953	Open-wheel	United States	
Convertible Division		Defunct	National	1956–1959	Convertible	United States	
Sportsman Division	NASCAR Igloo Sportsman Challenge	Defunct	National	1989–1996	Stock car	United States	
Grand National East Series		Defunct	Regional	1972–1973	Stock car	United States	
All-Star Tour	Busch All-Star Tour	Defunct	Regional	1985–2002	Dirt late model	United States	
Grand American Stock Car Division	Grand American	Defunct	National	19681972	Pony car	United States	
Grand American Stock Car Division	Grand American	Defunct	National	1978–1985	Stock car	United States	
Short Track Division		Defunct	Regional	1951–1959	Stock car	United States	
Pro Invitational Series		Defunct	Online	2020–2021	eRacing	United States	
Heat Pro League		Defunct	Online	2019–2020	eRacing	International	

== See also ==
- NASCAR
- ARCA
- IndyCar Series
- Formula 1
- NHRA
- American Canadian Tour
- World of Outlaws
- List of auto racing tracks
- List of auto racing tracks in the United States
