= Ernest J. Windmiller =

American politician

Ernest J. Windmiller (July 24, 1897 – November 4, 1971) was an American politician and businessman.

Windmiller was born in Cresco, Howard County, Iowa and served in the United States Army during World War I. He lived in Fergus Falls, Otter Tail County, Minnesota with his wife family and was the owner of Star Laundry and Cleaners. Windmiller served on the Fergus Falls City Council and in the Minnesota House of Representatives from 1943 to 1960. Windmiller died at St. Luke's Hospital in Fargo, North Dakota and his funeral and burial was in Fergus Falls, Minnesota.
