= Kee High School =

Public secondary school in Lansing, Iowa, United States

Location
- 569 Center Street; Lansing, IA 52151; United States
- 43.3604°N 91.2222°W

Information
- Type: Public
- Motto: ...committed to educating the future
- Established: 1961 (Consolidation of Lansing High School and New Albin High School)
- School district: Eastern Allamakee Community School District
- Superintendent: Dale Crozier
- Principal: Sarah Updegraff
- Teaching staff: 15.38 (FTE)
- Grades: 9-12
- Enrollment: 91 (2023-2024)
- Student to teacher ratio: 5.92
- Colors: Purple, White & Silver
- Athletics conference: Upper Iowa
- Mascot: Kee-Hawk
- Newspaper: The Talon (An insert to the Waukon Standard
- Website: www.keeschools.com

Kee High School is a rural, public high school located in Lansing, Iowa. The school is part of the Eastern Allamakee Community School District. Their mascot is the Kee-Hawk.

== Athletics ==
The Kee-Hawks compete in the Upper Iowa Conference in the following sports:

- Cross Country
  - Boys' 5-time State Champions (1980, 1981, 1982, 1988, 1989)
- Volleyball
- Football
- Basketball
- Track and Field
  - Girls' State co-champions (2019) with Alburnett
- Baseball
  - 11-time State Champions (1973, 1977, 1978, 1980, 1981, 1986, 1989, 1990, 1991, 1992, 2005)
- Softball
  - 2016, 2017 Class 1A State Champions

As of 2006, Kee's baseball coach, Gene Schultz, is the winningest high school baseball coach in the United States.

== See also ==
- List of high schools in Iowa
