= Leighton Abel =

American politician and businessman

Member of the Iowa House of Representatives from the 70th district
- In office January 8, 1951 – January 9, 1955

Personal details
- Born: Leighton W. Abel; February 22, 1900 Monona, Iowa, U.S.
- Died: April 23, 1975 (aged 75) Guttenberg, Iowa, U.S.
- Party: Republican
- Occupation: Politician, businessman

Leighton W. Abel (February 22, 1900 – April 23, 1975) was an American politician and businessman.

Born in Monona, Iowa, Abel owned the Abel Shoe Company in Guttenberg, Iowa. He was also involved with the insurance business, He served in the Iowa House of Representatives from 1951 to 1955 and was a Republican. Abel then served as a lobbyist and also served as secretary of the Iowa Commerce Commission. Abel died at a hospital in Guttenberg, Iowa.
