= Mount Hosmer (Iowa) =

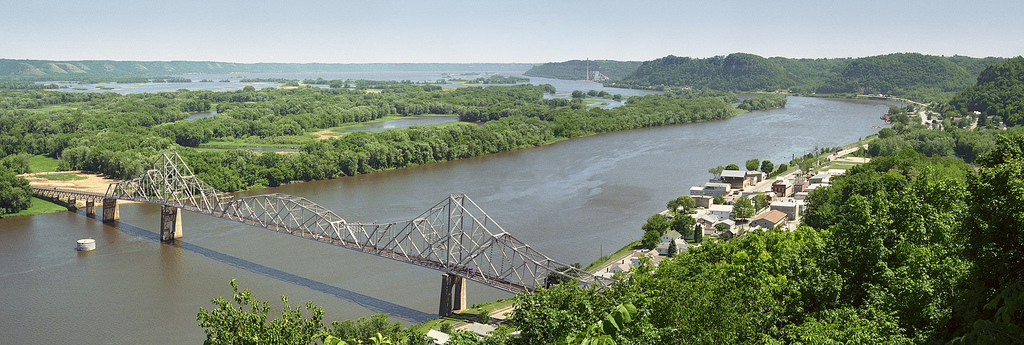
- View from Mt. Hosmer

Highest point
- Elevation: 1,040 ft (320 m)
- Coordinates: 43°21′59″N 91°13′20″W

Geography
- Location: Allamakee County, Iowa, United States

Climbing
- Easiest route: Road entrance

Mount Hosmer is a bluff overlooking Lansing, Iowa. It is located directly adjacent to the Upper Mississippi River and offers a panoramic view of the river, including the Black Hawk Bridge. Mount Hosmer rises 450 feet above downtown Lansing.

Accessible from Lansing, Mount Hosmer Park is a popular destination for photographers. According to a plaque inside the park, Mount Hosmer is named for Harriet Hosmer, a sculptor, who won a footrace to the summit of the hill during a steamboat layover during the 1850s.

== See also ==
- Pikes Peak, a similar park atop a bluff in Clayton County
