= Polygonal Barn, New Oregon Township =

- U.S. National Register of Historic Places
- Location within Iowa Location within the United States
- Location: Off Iowa Highway 39, Cresco, Iowa
- Coordinates: 43°13′32″N 92°7′38″W
- Area: less than one acre
- Built: 1920
- MPS: Iowa Round Barns: The Sixty Year Experiment TR
- NRHP reference No.: 86001437
- Added to NRHP: June 30, 1986

The Polygonal Barn, New Oregon Township is an historic building located near Cresco in rural Howard County, Iowa, United States. It was built in 1920 as a show barn for English Shorthorn cattle. The 16-sided building measures 70 feet (21 m) in diameter. The polygonal barn of 6 to 16 equal sides is the most common variation of the round barn that was constructed in Iowa. It features a two-pitch sectional roof, a 13 feet (4.0 m) central silo and small dormers near the top of the roof on the north and south sides. The barn was used for dairy cattle from 1958 to 1968, and it was then used for pigs and feeder cattle. It has been listed on the National Register of Historic Places since 1986.
