= Postville Community School District =

Public school district in Postville, Iowa, United States

Coordinates: 43.082583°N 91.572890°W

Location
- Postville, Iowa Allamakee, Clayton, Fayette, and Winneshiek counties United States
- Coordinates: 43.082583, -91.572890

District information
- Type: Local school district
- Grades: K-12
- Superintendent: Tim Dugger
- Schools: 4
- Budget: $12,000,000 (2020-21)
- NCES District ID: 1923340

Students and staff
- Students: 694 (2022-23)
- Teachers: 65.51 FTE
- Staff: 56.87 FTE
- Student–teacher ratio: 10.59
- Athletic conference: Upper Iowa
- District mascot: Pirates
- Colors: Red and Black

Other information
- Website: www.postvilleschools.com

Postville Community School District is a rural public school district headquartered in Postville, Iowa.

It operates Cora B. Darling Elementary School, named after a teacher, and Postville Junior-Senior High School, also known as John R. Mott High School, named for John R. Mott, the 1946 winner of the Nobel Peace Prize.

The district occupies sections of four counties: Allamakee, Clayton, Fayette, and Winneshiek, and serves the city of Postville, and surrounding rural areas.

== Demographics ==
As of 1999, the high school had about 205 students. As of 2017, about 45% of the students at the elementary school were of Mexican or Central American origin.

== See also ==
- List of school districts in Iowa
