= John L. Bascom =

American politician (1860–1950)

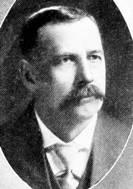

Member of the Iowa House of Representatives from the Dickinson County (97th) district
- In office January 8, 1907 – January 12, 1913

Personal details
- Born: November 6, 1860 Farmersburg, Iowa
- Died: January 1, 1950 (aged 89)
- Resting place: Okoboji Cemetery, Arnolds Park, Iowa
- Party: Republican
- Spouse: Winifred Yorker
- Education: Northern Indiana Normal School (now Valparaiso University)
- Occupation: lawyer
- Profession: law, real estate

John Luman Bascom (November 6, 1860 – January 1, 1950) was born in Farmersburg, Iowa, the son of John Sanburn Bascom and Phoebe Spencer. He was an Iowan lawyer and politician. A member of the Republican Party, he was elected three times to the Iowa House of Representatives, representing the Dickinson County district (House District 97) and serving from January 8, 1907, to January 12, 1913. He was educated at the Northern Indiana Normal School (now Valparaiso University) in Valparaiso, Indiana, studying science and law. He was admitted to the Iowa bar in 1888 and worked in law and real estate. He married Winifred Yorker in 1904, from which union produced four children, three daughters and one son. Bascom is buried at the Okoboji Cemetery in Arnolds Park, Iowa.

== Notes ==
† Appears to be a reproduction of the relevant records from the Iowa Official Register, produced biannually by the Iowa Secretary of State, though not attributed as such on the site.
