= Parker Hesse =

American football player (born 1995)

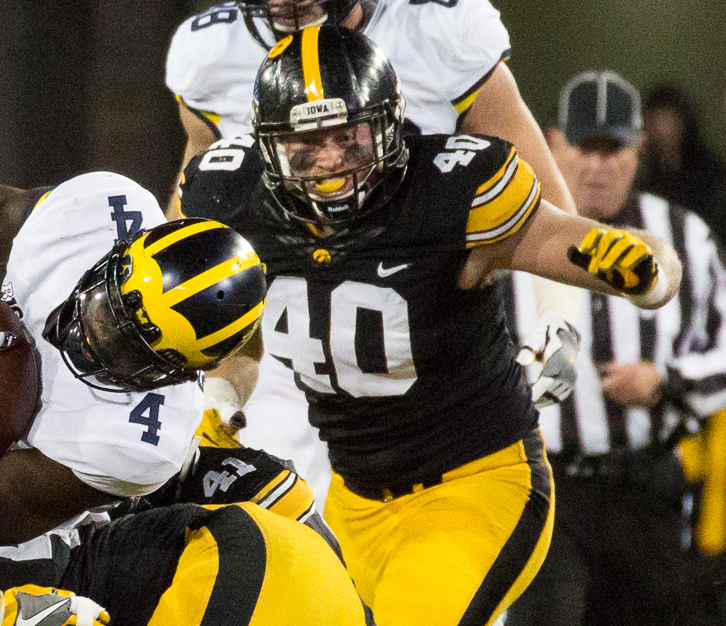
- Hesse with the Iowa Hawkeyes in 2016

Profile
- Position: Tight end

Personal information
- Born: May 26, 1995 (age 31); La Crosse, Wisconsin, U.S.
- Listed height: 6 ft 3 in (1.91 m)
- Listed weight: 255 lb (116 kg)

Career information
- High school: Waukon (Waukon, Iowa)
- College: Iowa (2014–2018)
- NFL draft: 2019: undrafted

Career history
- Tennessee Titans (2019–2020)*; Atlanta Falcons (2021–2023); Detroit Lions (2024)
- * Offseason or practice squad member only

Career NFL statistics as of 2024
- Receptions: 14
- Receiving yards: 132
- Stats at Pro Football Reference

Parker Hesse (born May 26, 1995) is an American professional football tight end. He played college football for the Iowa Hawkeyes.

== College career ==
Hesse was a member of the Iowa Hawkeyes for five seasons, redshirting as a true freshman. He originally practiced as a linebacker during his redshirt year, but was moved to defensive end near the end of the season. He finished his collegiate career with 182 tackles, 14 sacks, 31 tackles for loss and two interceptions in 52 games played.

== Professional career ==
Pre-draft measurables
Height	Weight	Arm length	Hand span	40-yard dash	10-yard split	20-yard split	20-yard shuttle	Three-cone drill	Vertical jump	Broad jump	Bench press
6 ft 2 1/8 in (1.88 m)	253 lb (115 kg)	32 1/8 in (0.82 m)	8 5/8 in (0.22 m)	4.87 s	1.67 s	2.76 s	4.40 s	7.18 s	37.0 in (0.94 m)	9 ft 7 in (2.92 m)	18 reps
All values from Pro Day

=== Tennessee Titans ===
Hesse signed with the Tennessee Titans as an undrafted free agent on May 13, 2019. He was moved to tight end during the preseason and was waived at the end of training camp. He was resigned by the Titans' practice squad, where he spent the rest of the season. Hesse was waived during final roster cuts before being resigned to the Titans' practice squad again during the 2020 season.

=== Atlanta Falcons ===
Hesse was signed by the Atlanta Falcons on May 13, 2021. He was waived on October 9, 2021, and re-signed to the practice squad. He was promoted to the active roster on November 18. He was waived on December 6 and re-signed to the practice squad. He was promoted back to the active roster on January 4, 2022.

The Falcons re-signed Hesse on February 23, 2023. He was released on August 29, and re-signed to the practice squad. He did not sign a reserve/future contract after the season and thus became a free agent upon the expiration of his practice squad contract.

=== Detroit Lions ===
On May 13, 2024, Hesse signed with the Detroit Lions. He was released on November 2.
