= Wilma Anderson Gilman =

American concert pianist

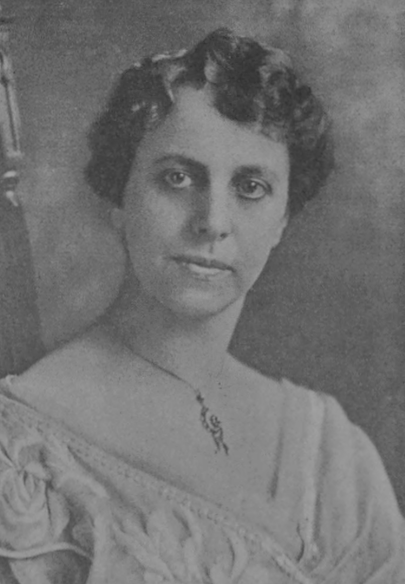
- Born: Wilma Hortensia Anderson; July 9, 1881; Cresco, Iowa, U.S.
- Died: September 12, 1971 (aged 90)
- Occupations: concert pianist; music teacher; clubwoman
- Spouse: Charles Lewis Gilman (m. 1907; died 1930)
- Children: 2

Wilma Anderson Gilman (née, Anderson; July 9, 1881 – September 12, 1971) was an American concert pianist, music teacher, and clubwoman. After making her debut in Brussels, she appeared in concerts in 34 U.S. states. Gilman was the first Minnesota musician asked to play as a soloist with the Minneapolis Symphony.

== Early life and education ==
Wilma Hortensia Anderson was born in Cresco, Howard County, Iowa, July 9, 1881. (Note: According to Leonard (1914) and Familysearch.org, Wilma was born in Winneshiek County, Iowa. According to her obituary in the Star Tribune (1971), Wilma was born in Ojata, North Dakota.) (Note: According to Leonard (1914), Wilma was born in July 1883.) She was the daughter of Andrew Edward Anderson (1852-1929) and Lavina N. (Nichols) Anderson (1847-1931). Her siblings were: Evelyn, Edward, Ernest, and Don. The family lived in a small town in North Dakota, coming to Minneapolis, Minnesota in 1890.

She attended grade and private schools in Minneapolis, taking lessons on the piano. When twelve years old, she made a concert trip with the Hutchison Family and the Ski-U-Mah Quartet. In 1896, she went with her sister, Ruth Anderson, to Europe for further music study and remained there four years. She received an additional two years of private schooling.

== Career ==
On returning to the U.S., Gilman made several concert trips throughout the country, studying and playing in New York City between trips.

Since making Minneapolis her permanent home, she was active in the music profession as a concert pianist, teacher, and clubwoman. With T. P. Giddings, Minneapolis Public Schools music supervisor, she worked out a system of piano class teaching which was used in many of the largest cities of the U.S. Gilman was also a teacher of piano and music literature in the MacPhail School of Music. She was a member of Minnesota State Music Teachers Association.

Gilman was for several years chair of the music committee of the Minnesota Federation of Women's Clubs. She served on the Executive Board of the Minnesota Thursday Musical Club. She was active in various other organizations whose service was toward raising the standard and cooperation of the music profession. She was also a member of the St. Anthony Falls chapter of the Daughters of the American Revolution.

== Personal life ==
On June 20, 1907, in Hennepin County, Minnesota, she married Charles Lewis Gilman (1882-1930). They had two children, Frances Wilma Gilman (1914–2010) and Clark A. Gilman (1917–?).

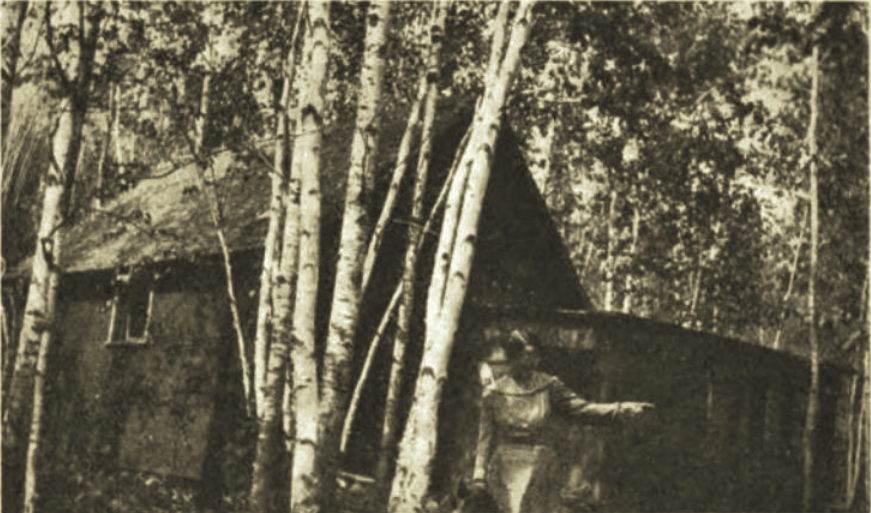
Gilman home in northern Minnesota

Mr. and Mrs. Gilman owned a second home in a forested area of northern Minnesota, which she wrote about in The Minnesota Horticulturist.

Gilman was ranked an expert shot. She favored woman suffrage. In religion, she was Presbyterian.

Wilma Anderson Gilman died September 12, 1971. Her correspondence and memoirs are held by the Minnesota Historical Society.
