= John R. Mott High School =

Public secondary school in Postville, Iowa, United States

Location
- 314 W. Post St; Postville, Iowa, 52162; United States
- 43.0826°N 91.5734°W

Information
- Type: Public secondary
- School district: Postville Community School District
- Superintendent: Tim Dugger
- Principal: Brendan Knudtson
- Teaching staff: 28.81 (FTE)
- Grades: 7-12
- Enrollment: 365 (2023-2024)
- Student to teacher ratio: 12.67
- Colors: Red and Black
- Athletics conference: Upper Iowa
- Mascot: Pirate
- Website: www.postvilleschools.com/postville-jrsr-high

John R. Mott High School, or Postville Jr/Sr High School, is a public high school in Postville, Iowa. The school is part of the Postville Community School District. Its mascot is the Postville Pirate.

== Athletics ==
The Pirates compete in the Upper Iowa Conference in the following sports:

- Cross Country
- Volleyball
- Football
- Basketball
- Wrestling
- Track and Field
- Golf
- Soccer
- Baseball
  - 1992 Class 2A State Champions
- Softball

== Sources ==
- Official Website

== See also ==
- List of high schools in Iowa
