= Cresco, Iowa =

- City
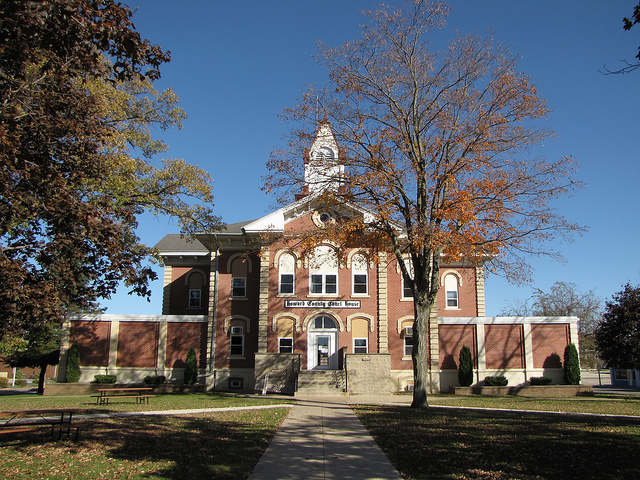
- Howard County Courthouse in Cresco
- Motto: "Iowa's Year Round Play Ground"
- Location of Cresco, Iowa

- Location within Iowa Location within the United States
- Coordinates: 43°22′28″N 92°6′54″W
- Country: United States
- State: Iowa
- County: Howard
- Incorporated: June 6, 1868

Government
  - Mayor: Alex Fortune

Area
  - Total: 3.34 sq mi (8.65 km^{2})
  - Land: 3.34 sq mi (8.65 km^{2})
  - Water: 0 sq mi (0.00 km^{2})
- Elevation: 1,293 ft (394 m)

Population (2020)
  - Total: 3,888
  - Density: 1,164.2/sq mi (449.49/km^{2})
- Time zone: UTC-6 (Central (CST))
  - Summer (DST): UTC-5 (CDT)
- ZIP Code: 52136
- Area code: 563
- FIPS code: 19-17220
- GNIS feature ID: 0455712
- Website: www.cityofcresco.com

Cresco is a city in Howard County, Iowa, United States. The population was 3,888 at the 2020 census, down from 3,905 at the 2000 census. It is the county seat of Howard County.

== History ==
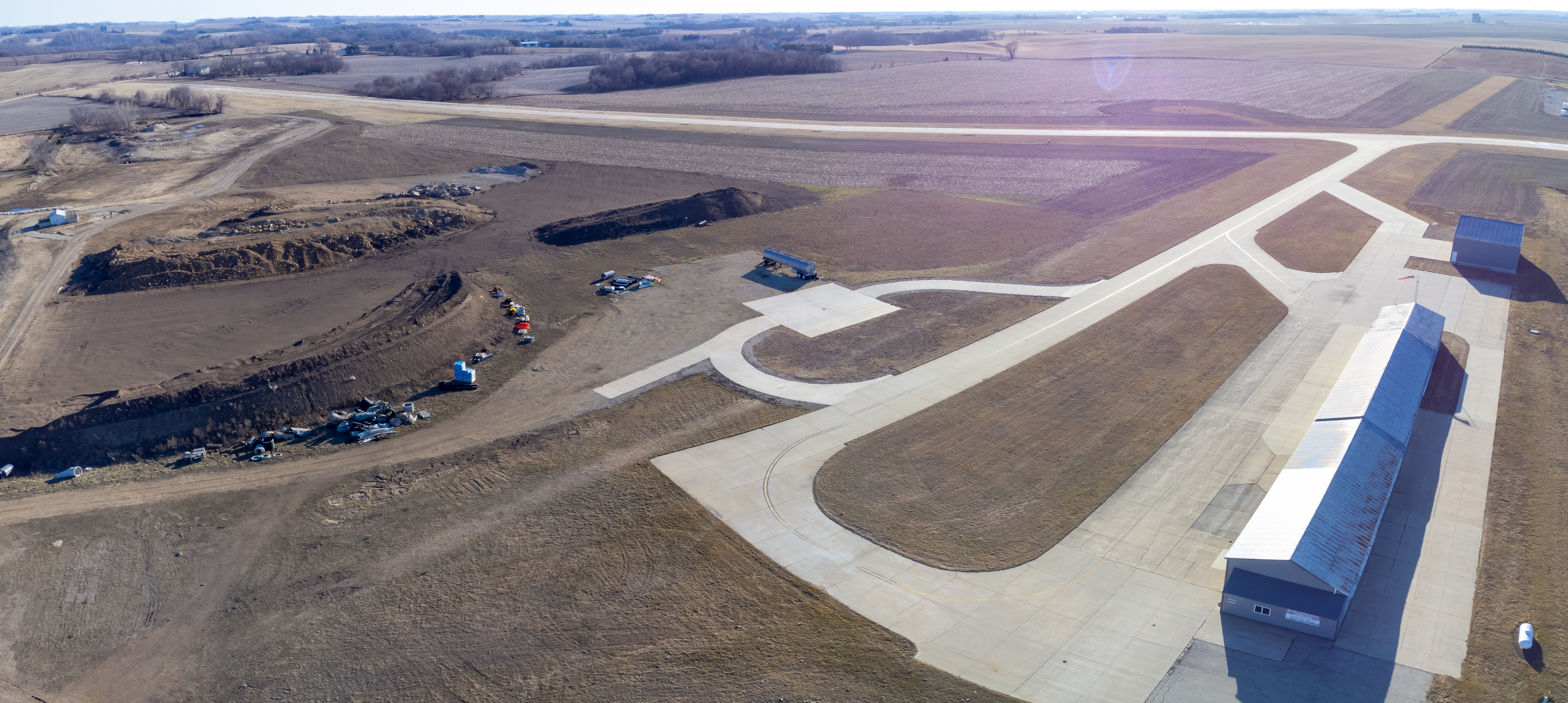
Cresco airport

Cresco was platted in 1866, when the railroad was expanding into the area. "Cresco" is Latin for "I grow". Cresco was incorporated on June 6, 1868.

On October 20, 1980, The David Letterman Show was broadcast from Cresco, the winner of a competition to host the show.

== Geography ==
According to the United States Census Bureau, the city has an area of 3.35 square miles (8.68 km^{2}), all land.

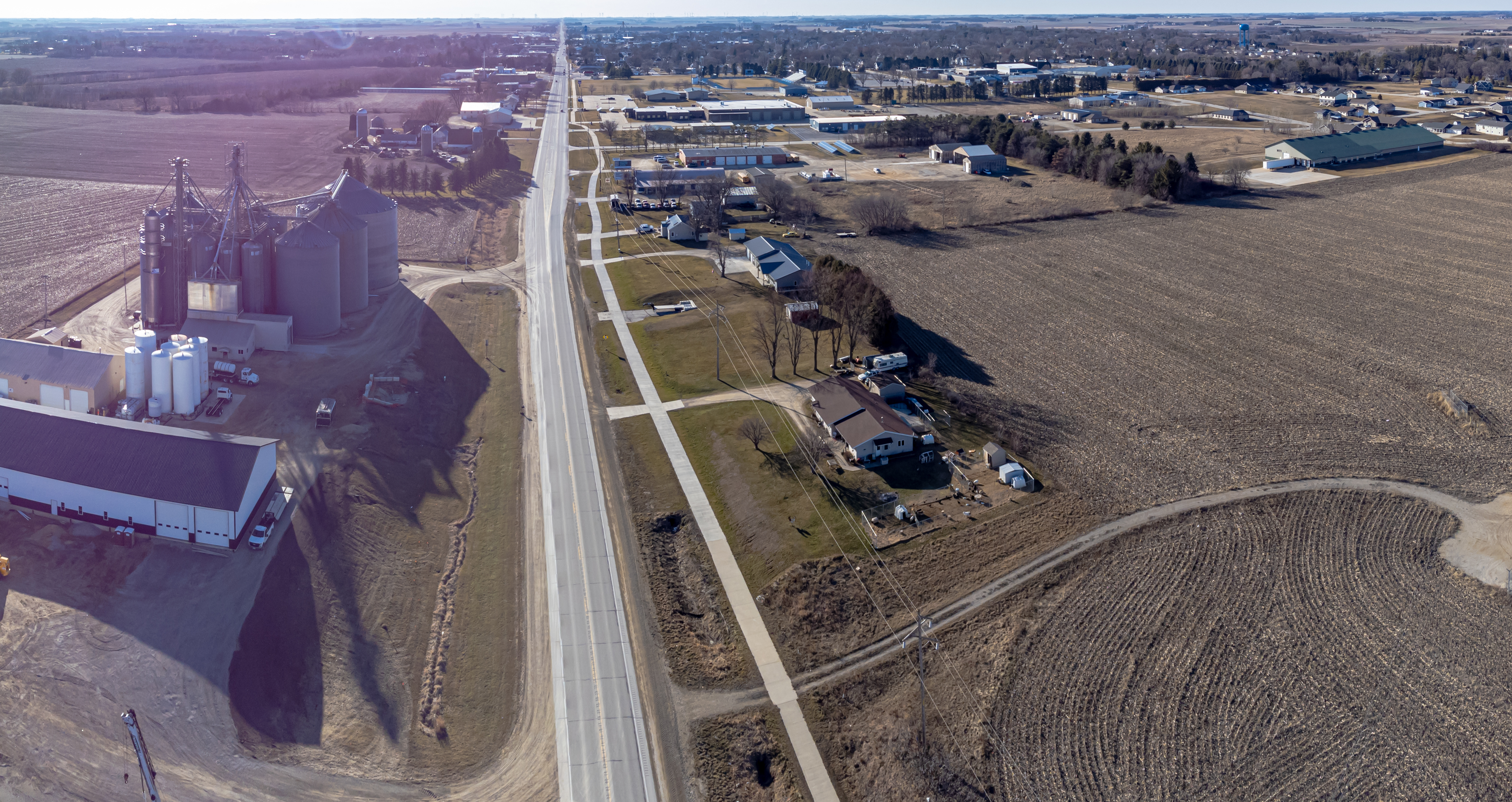
IA-9 runs through town

=== Climate ===
Cresco experiences a humid continental climate (Köppen Dfb) with long, cold, snowy winters and very warm, humid summers.

Climate data for Cresco
Month	Jan	Feb	Mar	Apr	May	Jun	Jul	Aug	Sep	Oct	Nov	Dec	Year
Record high °F (°C)	54 (12)	63 (17)	83 (28)	91 (33)	91 (33)	100 (38)	102 (39)	101 (38)	98 (37)	92 (33)	75 (24)	62 (17)	102 (39)
Mean daily maximum °F (°C)	21.5 (−5.8)	27.6 (−2.4)	40.0 (4.4)	55.6 (13.1)	68.7 (20.4)	78.3 (25.7)	81.9 (27.7)	79.7 (26.5)	71.6 (22.0)	59.2 (15.1)	41.4 (5.2)	26.7 (−2.9)	54.4 (12.4)
Mean daily minimum °F (°C)	2.8 (−16.2)	9.4 (−12.6)	21.9 (−5.6)	34.0 (1.1)	45.8 (7.7)	55.5 (13.1)	59.6 (15.3)	57.3 (14.1)	47.9 (8.8)	36.2 (2.3)	23.5 (−4.7)	9.4 (−12.6)	33.6 (0.9)
Record low °F (°C)	−35 (−37)	−36 (−38)	−29 (−34)	−1 (−18)	23 (−5)	34 (1)	40 (4)	34 (1)	24 (−4)	10 (−12)	−16 (−27)	−30 (−34)	−36 (−38)
Average precipitation inches (mm)	1.02 (26)	0.88 (22)	2.21 (56)	3.52 (89)	3.92 (100)	4.65 (118)	4.54 (115)	5.17 (131)	3.69 (94)	2.40 (61)	2.36 (60)	1.27 (32)	35.63 (904)
Average snowfall inches (cm)	10.0 (25)	6.9 (18)	6.4 (16)	2.5 (6.4)	trace	0 (0)	0 (0)	0 (0)	0 (0)	0.4 (1.0)	4.9 (12)	9.0 (23)	40.1 (102)
Source: NOAA

== Demographics ==
Historical population
Census	Pop.	Note	%±
1870	912		—
1880	1,875		105.6%
1890	2,018		7.6%
1900	2,806		39.0%
1910	2,658		−5.3%
1920	3,195		20.2%
1930	3,069		−3.9%
1940	3,530		15.0%
1950	3,638		3.1%
1960	3,809		4.7%
1970	3,927		3.1%
1980	3,860		−1.7%
1990	3,669		−4.9%
2000	3,905		6.4%
2010	3,868		−0.9%
2020	3,888		0.5%
U.S. Decennial Census

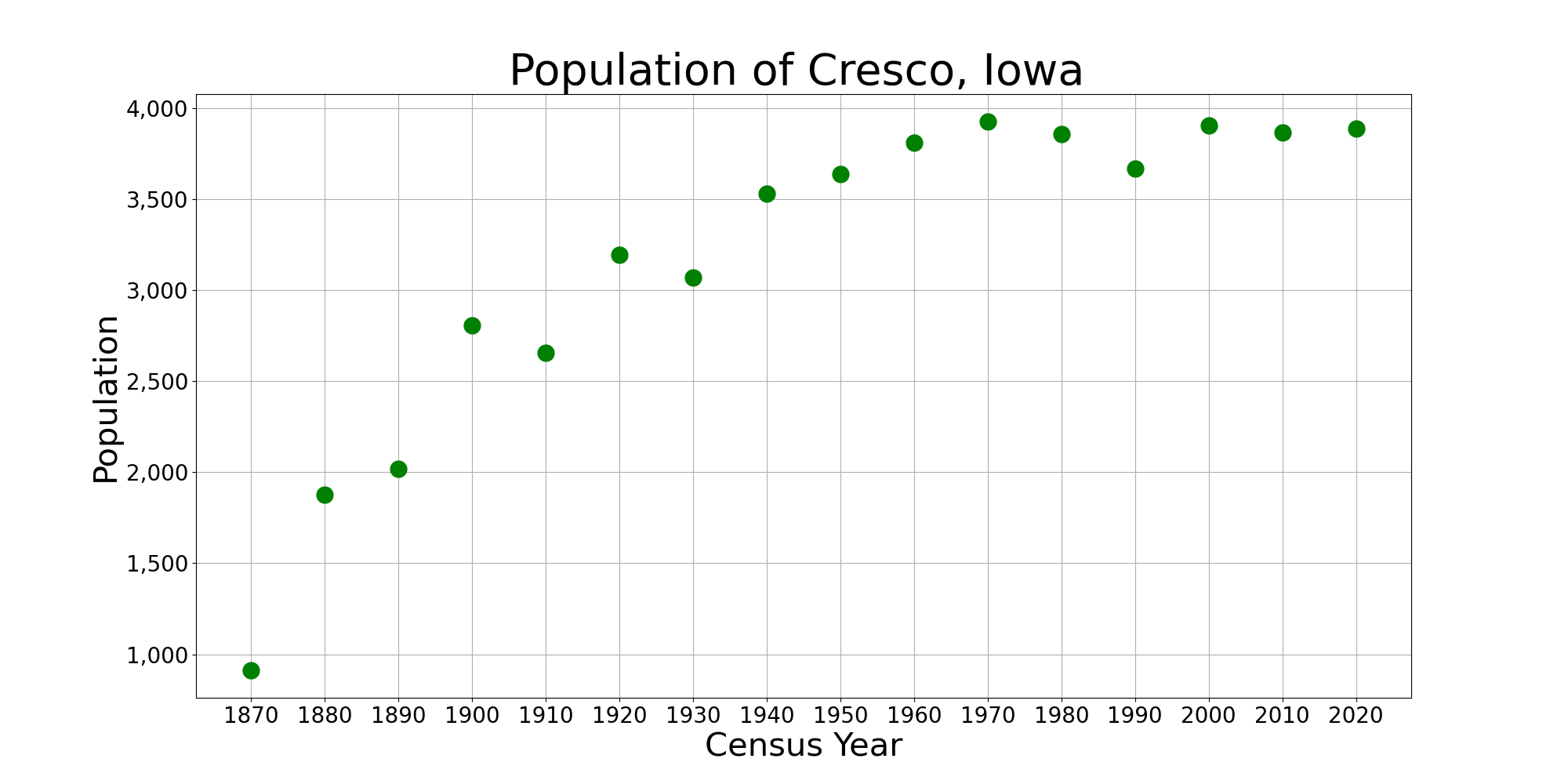
The population of Cresco from US census data

=== 2020 census ===
As of the 2020 census, there were 3,888 people, 1,699 households, and 970 families residing in the city. The population density was 1,164.2 inhabitants per square mile (449.5/km^{2}). There were 1,846 housing units at an average density of 552.7 per square mile (213.4/km^{2}). The median age was 41.1 years. 23.9% of residents were under the age of 18 and 20.8% were 65 years of age or older. 25.8% of residents were under the age of 20; 5.3% were between the ages of 20 and 24; 23.2% were from 25 to 44; and 24.8% were from 45 to 64. The gender makeup of the city was 49.2% male and 50.8% female. For every 100 females there were 97.0 males, and for every 100 females age 18 and over there were 94.4 males age 18 and over.

100% of residents lived in rural areas.

There were 1,699 households, of which 26.8% had children under the age of 18 living in them. Of all households, 43.4% were married-couple households, 7.2% were cohabitating-couple households, 20.7% were households with a male householder and no spouse or partner present, and 28.8% were households with a female householder and no spouse or partner present. 42.9% of all households were non-families. About 37.6% of all households were made up of individuals and 17.0% had someone living alone who was 65 years of age or older.

There were 1,846 housing units, of which 8.0% were vacant. The homeowner vacancy rate was 2.4% and the rental vacancy rate was 9.1%.

Racial composition as of the 2020 census
Race	Number	Percent
White	3,628	93.3%
Black or African American	22	0.6%
American Indian and Alaska Native	24	0.6%
Asian	21	0.5%
Native Hawaiian and Other Pacific Islander	1	0.0%
Some other race	48	1.2%
Two or more races	144	3.7%
Hispanic or Latino (of any race)	108	2.8%

=== 2010 census ===
As of the census of 2010, there were 3,868 people, 1,660 households, and 962 families residing in the city. The population density was 1,154.6 inhabitants per square mile (445.8/km^{2}). There were 1,821 housing units at an average density of 543.6 per square mile (209.9/km^{2}). The racial makeup of the city was 97.3% White, 0.4% African American, 0.1% Native American, 0.4% Asian, 0.7% from other races, and 1.1% from two or more races. Hispanic or Latino of any race were 1.6% of the population.

There were 1,660 households, of which 29.3% had children under the age of 18 living with them, 45.1% were married couples living together, 9.0% had a female householder with no husband present, 3.9% had a male householder with no wife present, and 42.0% were non-families. 36.3% of all households were made up of individuals, and 17.3% had someone living alone who was 65 years of age or older. The average household size was 2.26 and the average family size was 2.95.

The median age in the city was 39.8 years. 25.1% of residents were under the age of 18; 7.4% were between the ages of 18 and 24; 24.2% were from 25 to 44; 23.6% were from 45 to 64; and 19.7% were 65 years of age or older. The gender makeup of the city was 48.0% male and 52.0% female.

=== 2000 census ===
As of the census of 2000, there were 3,905 people, 1,652 households, and 1,004 families residing in the city. The population density was 1,184.1 inhabitants per square mile (457.2/km^{2}). There were 1,791 housing units at an average density of 543.1 per square mile (209.7/km^{2}). The racial makeup of the city was 98.77% White, 0.23% African American, 0.15% Native American, 0.15% Asian, 0.03% from other races, and 0.67% from two or more races. Hispanic or Latino of any race were 0.72% of the population.

There were 1,652 households, out of which 30.5% had children under the age of 18 living with them, 49.0% were married couples living together, 8.1% had a female householder with no husband present, and 39.2% were non-families. 35.0% of all households were made up of individuals, and 19.5% had someone living alone who was 65 years of age or older. The average household size was 2.27 and the average family size was 2.95.

Age spread: 25.6% under the age of 18, 7.1% from 18 to 24, 26.1% from 25 to 44, 18.5% from 45 to 64, and 22.8% who were 65 years of age or older. The median age was 39 years. For every 100 females, there were 88.6 males. For every 100 females age 18 and over, there were 87.0 males.

The median income for a household in the city was $32,236, and the median income for a family was $43,682. Males had a median income of $30,088 versus $21,444 for females. The per capita income for the city was $18,190. About 2.1% of families and 6.8% of the population were below the poverty line, including 5.2% of those under age 18 and 5.9% of those age 65 or over.

== Arts and culture ==
=== Museums and other points of interest ===
The Mighty Howard County Fair takes place in June each year. Originally established in 1868, the inaugural Howard County Fair took place in the Howard County Court House Square. The arts and crafts, as well as produce exhibits, were housed on the top floor of the Court House, while larger exhibits were situated on the lawn surrounding the Court House.

Cresco Community Theatre is a nonprofit organization open to anyone with an idea or the desire to contribute. Contributing members decide which shows will be produced on the Cresco stage, and have ranged from famous productions to locally written plays.

Cresco is home to the Glen Brand Wrestling Hall of Fame of Iowa, which had its first inductee banquet in 1970. As of April 2010, 97 members had made outstanding contributions to the sport of amateur wrestling.

Although Cresco is no longer on a railroad line, it is home to a restored Milwaukee Road FP7 diesel engine known as the Heritage Train, displayed in Beadle Park at the center of the city on Highway 9. Cresco is also the headquarters of Featherlite Trailers.

The Cresco post office contains a mural, Iowa Farming, painted in 1937 by Richard Haines. Murals were produced from 1934 to 1943 in the United States through the Section of Painting and Sculpture, later called the Section of Fine Arts, of the Treasury Department.

== Media ==
The city newspaper is the weekly Cresco Times Plain Dealer, published on Wednesdays. The Cresco Shopper is published on Tuesdays.

KCZQ 102.3 FM is a licensed radio station based in Cresco, known as "Super C". The station's studios, near Elm Street, serve as its central operational hub. Mega Media LTD has owned KCZQ since it began broadcasting in 1991.

== Education ==
Notre Dame Catholic School in Cresco and Trinity Catholic school in Protivin offer private education to elementary students. There was previously a Notre Dame High School in Cresco. Its final class graduated in 1989.

=== Governance and expansion (1871–1880) ===
The school board's earliest documented minutes date to December 1871. Among the board's initial members were Augustus Beadle, Edward Gillette, W. R. Mead, S. A. Stone, and W. H. Patterson. During this period bonds were issued and subsequently sold for cash, providing the financial resources to expand the school building with the addition of the west wing.

The next year brought changes in both the composition and governance of the board. In January 1872, the board welcomed new members D. W. Owe and Charles I. White. A series of appointments took place in March of that same year, with Beadle assuming the role of president, John E. Peck appointed treasurer, and White taking on the position of secretary.

During the course of 1872, the board undertook initiatives to further enhance the educational facilities. An allocation of $400 was approved for the acquisition of four lots adjacent to the schoolhouse, aiming to provide ample space for future development. Additionally, a tax levy of 10 mills on the dollar was introduced to contribute to the school house fund.

=== Growth and expansion (1878–1896) ===
In 1878, an east wing was added to the building. The project was completed by 1880, with a total estimated cost of $13,000. Cresco High School's inaugural commencement ceremony took place on June 18, 1880, in Lyric Hall. The principal, L. T. Weld, delivered an address to the graduating class of six students. Although historical records from this period are somewhat limited, it is known that the high school offered a three-year course of study at the time. The curriculum was expanded to a four-year program in 1901.

The physical infrastructure of Cresco's schools continued to evolve to meet its expanding student population's needs. In 1893, a grade school building was erected on the central campus. This structure experienced a devastating fire in 1917.

In response to the growing demands of Cresco's educational landscape, the South Ward grade school was constructed in 1896. This facility underwent a comprehensive renovation in 1953.

=== Physical growth and development (1905–1913) ===
To meet Cresco's ever-changing educational requirements, a new high school building was erected in 1905. Citizens in the independent school district approved the project, with a budget not exceeding $25,000, in March that year. The construction bids were awarded in May, and by December, classes were already being held in the newly completed facilities.

The structure, 100 feet by 80 feet, was built out of pressed brick and Postville stone. It reached a height of 84 feet from the grade line to the top of its dome. The cornice and bell tower were made of galvanized iron. Though called a high school, the building held classes for students in grades 3 to 12.

The building's first floor consisted of the superintendent's office and five grade rooms. On the second floor was the seventh-grade room, six high-school classrooms, four recitation rooms, an assembly room, and a laboratory. The basement housed the manual training department and the furnace room.

The building used a steam heating system and an advanced ventilation system. In 1910, The Howard County Times wrote: "a series of air ducts lead to the cupola where a number of radiators form an upward current that completely changes the air of all rooms in approximately three minutes. Fresh air from the outside is first warmed over radiators and then conducted to all the rooms, after which it passes out through the ducts leading to the cupola."

In 1919, Cresco opened the east high school building and the West Ward school building. To finance these projects, bonds totaling $56,000 were issued.

=== Modernization (1927–1951) ===
Cresco Junior College, founded on September 6, 1927, was in a renovated house opposite the high school buildings. It enrolled 19 students in its first year and 23 students the next year. The college faced a setback due to small enrollment and ceased operations after two years.

In 1935, a new corridor was constructed, linking the 1905 building with the 1919 building. The same year, plans began for the construction of a gymnasium. It was completed in 1938. As part of this expansion, the gymnasium in the 1919 building was reconfigured into a small performance space.

Further expansions and additions were made in 1951 with a new garage and bus barn, and a band room for the music program.

=== Consolidation and expansion (1960–1983) ===
The Howard-Winneshiek Community School District was established on July 1, 1960, through the consolidation of public schools. This brought together the public schools of Chester, Cresco, Elma, Lime Springs, and Ridgeway, necessitating the expansion of educational infrastructure to accommodate the growing student population.

In December 1965, voters approved a $1,500,000 bond proposal whose primary objective was to fund the construction of new elementary buildings in Lime Springs and Ridgeway and a high school in Cresco. Construction of the high school began in 1967, and Crestwood High School opened in 1968. During the transition to the new high school, the original school buildings in the Central Complex continued to be used for elementary and junior high courses. In 1983, these buildings underwent extensive renovations.

=== A new century (1991–present) ===
In July 1991, the citizens of the Howard-Winneshiek Community School District approved a bond issue of $5.975 million to fund construction of a new K-8 building north of Crestwood High School. They also approved the allocation of $700,000 from an existing schoolhouse fund balance specifically designated for the renovation of the outlying centers, ensuring that these educational spaces would receive the necessary upgrades and improvements.

The total cost of this initiative was $7.2 million. A majority of 64.5% voted in favor of the new school.

== Notable people ==
- Norman Borlaug, Nobel Peace Prize laureate, attended Cresco High School
- Charles Bowers, cartoonist and filmmaker
- Ellen Church, the world's first female flight attendant
- Edward Aloysius Fitzgerald, the fourth bishop of the Roman Catholic Diocese of Winona
- Wilma Anderson Gilman (1881–1971), concert pianist, music teacher, clubwoman
- Maurice C. Gregory, United States Marine Corps brigadier general
- Hal Holmes, United States congressman
- Edward Howard, Roman Catholic archbishop of Portland, Oregon
- Edouard Izac, Medal of Honor recipient
- Frank J. Lowry, United States admiral
- Oliver Munson, Wisconsin state senator
- Harold Nichols, former Iowa State University wrestling coach
- Robert E. Smylie, 24th governor of Idaho; raised in Cresco
- Elmarie Wendel, American actress and singer
- Ernest J. Windmiller, Minnesota state legislator and businessman

== Attractions ==
- Polygonal Barn, New Oregon Township, listed on the National Register of Historic Places
