= Farmersburg, Iowa =

- City
- Location of Farmersburg, Iowa
- Coordinates: 42°57′34″N 91°22′00″W
- Country: United States
- State: Iowa
- County: Clayton

Area
  - Total: 0.41 sq mi (1.05 km^{2})
  - Land: 0.41 sq mi (1.05 km^{2})
  - Water: 0 sq mi (0.00 km^{2})
- Elevation: 925 ft (282 m)

Population (2020)
  - Total: 271
  - Density: 667/sq mi (257.4/km^{2})
- Time zone: UTC-6 (Central (CST))
  - Summer (DST): UTC-5 (CDT)
- ZIP code: 52047
- Area code: 563
- FIPS code: 19-26850
- GNIS feature ID: 2394745

Farmersburg is a city in Clayton County, Iowa, United States. The population was 271 at the time of the 2020 census, down from 300 in 2000.

== History ==
Farmersburg was first called Windsor when it was surveyed in 1856.

In 1916, Farmersburg contained three general stores, bank, hotel, grain elevator, and lumber yards.

== Geography ==
According to the United States Census Bureau, the city has a total area of 0.40 square miles (1.04 km^{2}), all land.

== Demographics ==
Historical populations
Year	Pop.	±%
1900	143	—
1910	259	+81.1%
1920	290	+12.0%
1930	275	−5.2%
1940	296	+7.6%
1950	263	−11.1%
1960	250	−4.9%
1970	232	−7.2%
1980	276	+19.0%
1990	291	+5.4%
2000	300	+3.1%
2010	302	+0.7%
2020	271	−10.3%
Source:"U.S. Census website". United States Census Bureau. and Iowa Data Center; Source: U.S. Decennial Census

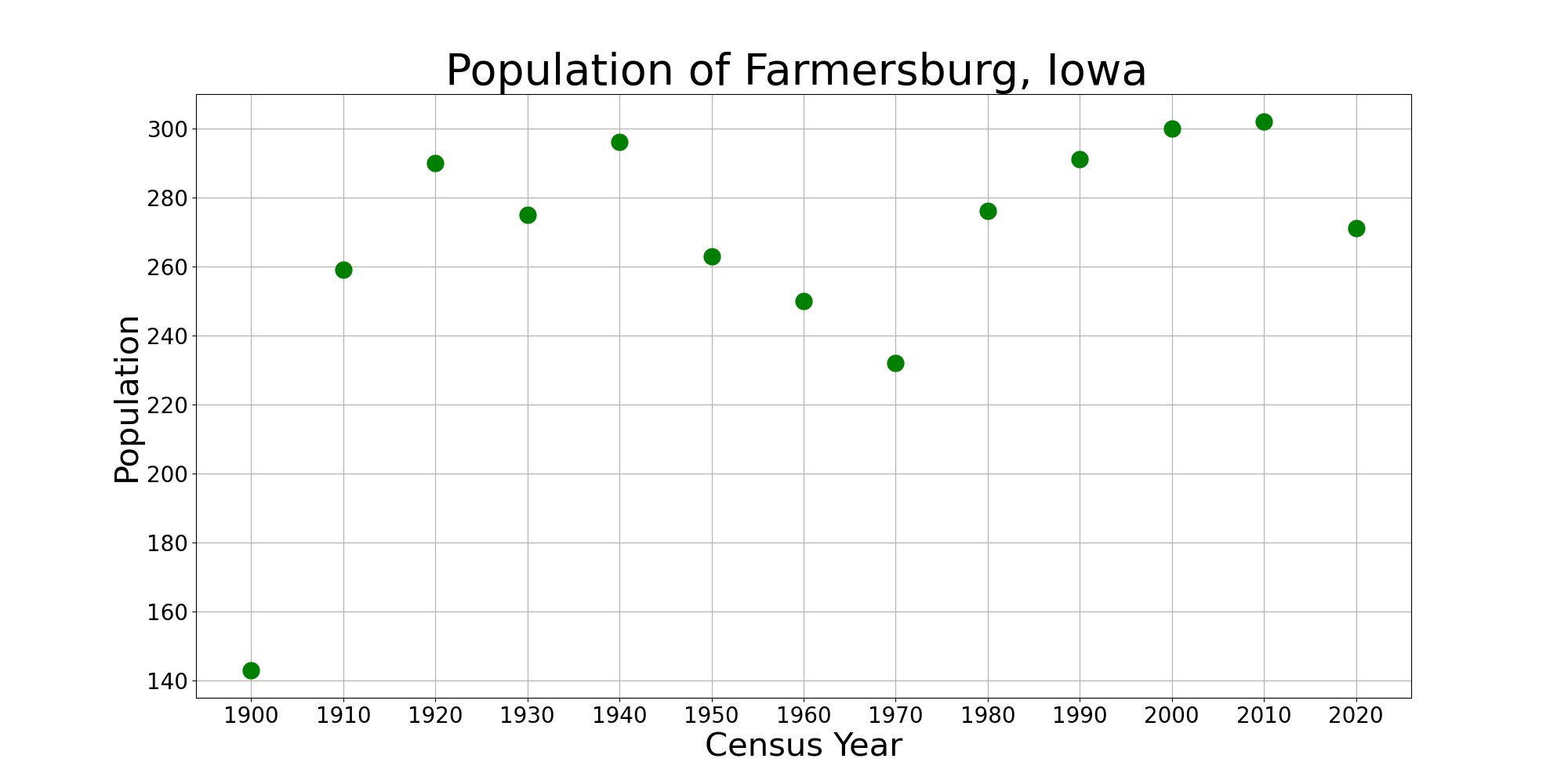
The population of Farmersburg, Iowa from US census data

=== 2020 census ===
As of the census of 2020, there were 271 people, 108 households, and 67 families residing in the city. The population density was 666.7 inhabitants per square mile (257.4/km^{2}). There were 125 housing units at an average density of 307.5 per square mile (118.7/km^{2}). The racial makeup of the city was 93.7% White, 0.4% Black or African American, 0.0% Native American, 0.0% Asian, 0.0% Pacific Islander, 0.0% from other races and 5.9% from two or more races. Hispanic or Latino persons of any race comprised 1.8% of the population.

Of the 108 households, 23.1% of which had children under the age of 18 living with them, 50.9% were married couples living together, 9.3% were cohabitating couples, 15.7% had a female householder with no spouse or partner present and 24.1% had a male householder with no spouse or partner present. 38.0% of all households were non-families. 33.3% of all households were made up of individuals, 12.0% had someone living alone who was 65 years old or older.

The median age in the city was 38.5 years. 25.5% of the residents were under the age of 20; 10.7% were between the ages of 20 and 24; 21.8% were from 25 and 44; 24.7% were from 45 and 64; and 17.3% were 65 years of age or older. The gender makeup of the city was 53.9% male and 46.1% female.

=== 2010 census ===
As of the census of 2010, there were 302 people, 126 households, and 80 families living in the city. The population density was 755.0 inhabitants per square mile (291.5/km^{2}). There were 133 housing units at an average density of 332.5 per square mile (128.4/km^{2}). The racial makeup of the city was 97.0% White, 0.3% African American, 0.3% Asian, and 2.3% from two or more races. Hispanic or Latino of any race were 0.3% of the population.

There were 126 households, of which 34.9% had children under the age of 18 living with them, 52.4% were married couples living together, 6.3% had a female householder with no husband present, 4.8% had a male householder with no wife present, and 36.5% were non-families. 28.6% of all households were made up of individuals, and 13.5% had someone living alone who was 65 years of age or older. The average household size was 2.40 and the average family size was 2.96.

The median age in the city was 37.4 years. 26.8% of residents were under the age of 18; 8.3% were between the ages of 18 and 24; 24.2% were from 25 to 44; 26.2% were from 45 to 64; and 14.6% were 65 years of age or older. The gender makeup of the city was 48.3% male and 51.7% female.

=== 2000 census ===
As of the census of 2000, there were 300 people, 123 households, and 83 families living in the city. The population density was 745.9 inhabitants per square mile (288.0/km^{2}). There were 130 housing units at an average density of 323.2 per square mile (124.8/km^{2}). The racial makeup of the city was 98.33% White, and 1.67% from two or more races. Hispanic or Latino of any race were 1.67% of the population.

There were 123 households, out of which 30.1% had children under the age of 18 living with them, 60.2% were married couples living together, 4.9% had a female householder with no husband present, and 32.5% were non-families. 29.3% of all households were made up of individuals, and 17.1% had someone living alone who was 65 years of age or older. The average household size was 2.44 and the average family size was 3.02.

In the city, the population was spread out, with 26.0% under the age of 18, 6.3% from 18 to 24, 28.7% from 25 to 44, 20.3% from 45 to 64, and 18.7% who were 65 years of age or older. The median age was 39 years. For every 100 females, there were 93.5 males. For every 100 females age 18 and over, there were 89.7 males.

The median income for a household in the city was $34,000, and the median income for a family was $40,694. Males had a median income of $28,750 versus $20,278 for females. The per capita income for the city was $14,796. About 2.6% of families and 6.3% of the population were below the poverty line, including none of those under the age of eighteen and 10.9% of those 65 or over.

== Education ==
It is within the MFL MarMac Community School District. The district formed on July 1, 1994, with the merger of the Mar-Mac and M-F-L districts.

== Notable person ==
- John L. Bascom, attorney and Iowa State Representative
- Pork Chop, famous dog
