= MFL MarMac Community School District =

Public school district in Monona, Iowa, United States

Coordinates: 43.046969°N 91.392603°W

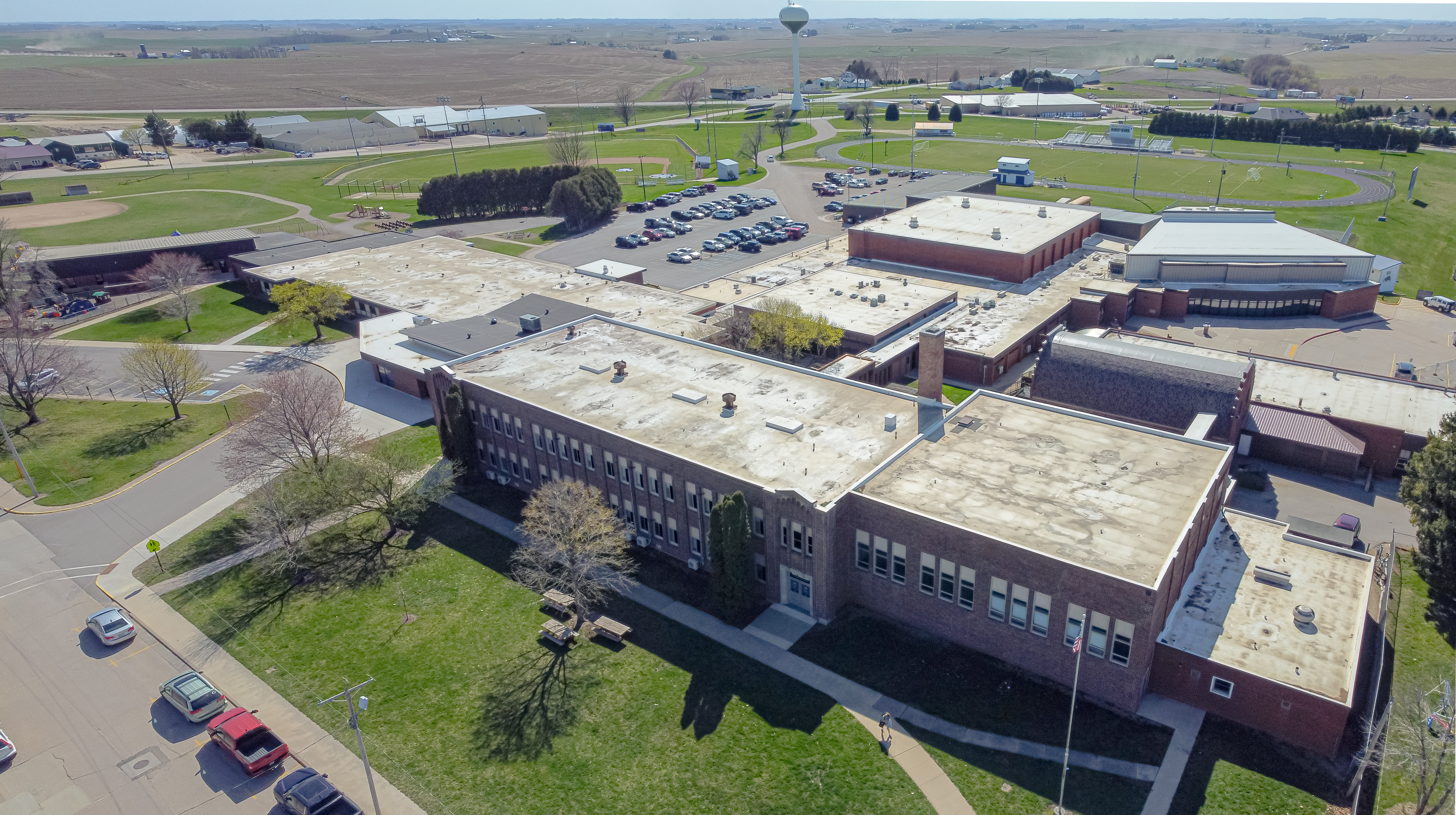

Location
- Monona, Iowa Clayton and Allamakee counties United States
- Coordinates: 43.046969, -91.392603

District information
- Type: Local school district
- Grades: K-12
- Established: 1994
- Superintendent: Tim Dugger
- Schools: 4
- Budget: $12,966,000 (2022-23)
- NCES District ID: 1918120

Students and staff
- Students: 894 (2022-23)
- Teachers: 62.24 FTE
- Staff: 68.58 FTE
- Student–teacher ratio: 14.36
- Athletic conference: Upper Iowa
- District mascot: Bulldogs
- Colors: Blue and Gold

Other information
- Website: www.mflmarmac.com

MFL MarMac Community School District is a rural public school district headquartered in Monona, Iowa. It operates an elementary school and high school in Monona and a separate middle school in McGregor.

The district is within Clayton and Allamakee counties. It serves Monona, McGregor, Farmersburg, Luana, and Marquette.

== History ==
The district formed on July 1, 1994, with the merger of the Mar-Mac and M-F-L districts.

In 2003, the district had about 1,000 students.

== Schools ==
- MFL MarMac Elementary School, Monona
- MFL MarMac Middle School, McGregor
- MFL MarMac High School, Monona

=== Predecessor Schools ===
- M-F-L
  - Monona-Farmersburg
    - Monona
    - Farmersburg
  - Luana
- Mar-Mac
  - McGregor
  - Marquette Community

== MFL MarMac High School ==
=== Athletics ===
The Bulldogs compete in the Upper Iowa Conference in the following sports:

- Cross Country
- Volleyball
- Football
- Basketball
- Wrestling
- Track and Field
- Golf
- Baseball
- Softball
- Soccer

The Monona high school baseball team was the fall season state champions in 1947 (fall) and 1948 (spring) and the MFL high school baseball team was the Class 1A summer state champions in 1976.

== See also ==
- List of school districts in Iowa
- List of high schools in Iowa
