= Lansing Township, Allamakee County, Iowa =

Township in Iowa, US

Lansing Township, Allamakee County
- Township
- Coordinates: 43°23′11″N 091°17′56″W
- Country: United States
- State: Iowa
- County: Allamakee

Area
  - Total: 50.0 sq mi (129.6 km^{2})
  - Land: 45.59 sq mi (118.09 km^{2})
  - Water: 4.4 sq mi (11.5 km^{2})
- Elevation: 1,033 ft (315 m)

Population (2010)
  - Total: 1,424
  - Density: 31/sq mi (12.1/km^{2})
- Time zone: UTC-6 (CST)
  - Summer (DST): UTC-5 (CDT)
- FIPS code: 19-92382
- GNIS feature ID: 0468192

Lansing Township is one of eighteen townships in Allamakee County, Iowa, USA. At the 2010 census, its population was 1424.

== History ==
Lansing Township was organized in 1852.

== Geography ==
Lansing Township covers an area of 50.04 square miles (129.6 km^{2}) and contains one settlement, Lansing. According to the USGS, it contains five cemeteries: Gethsemane, Heminway, Lansing Ridge, May's Prairie and Oak Hill.
