= Lansing, Iowa =

- City
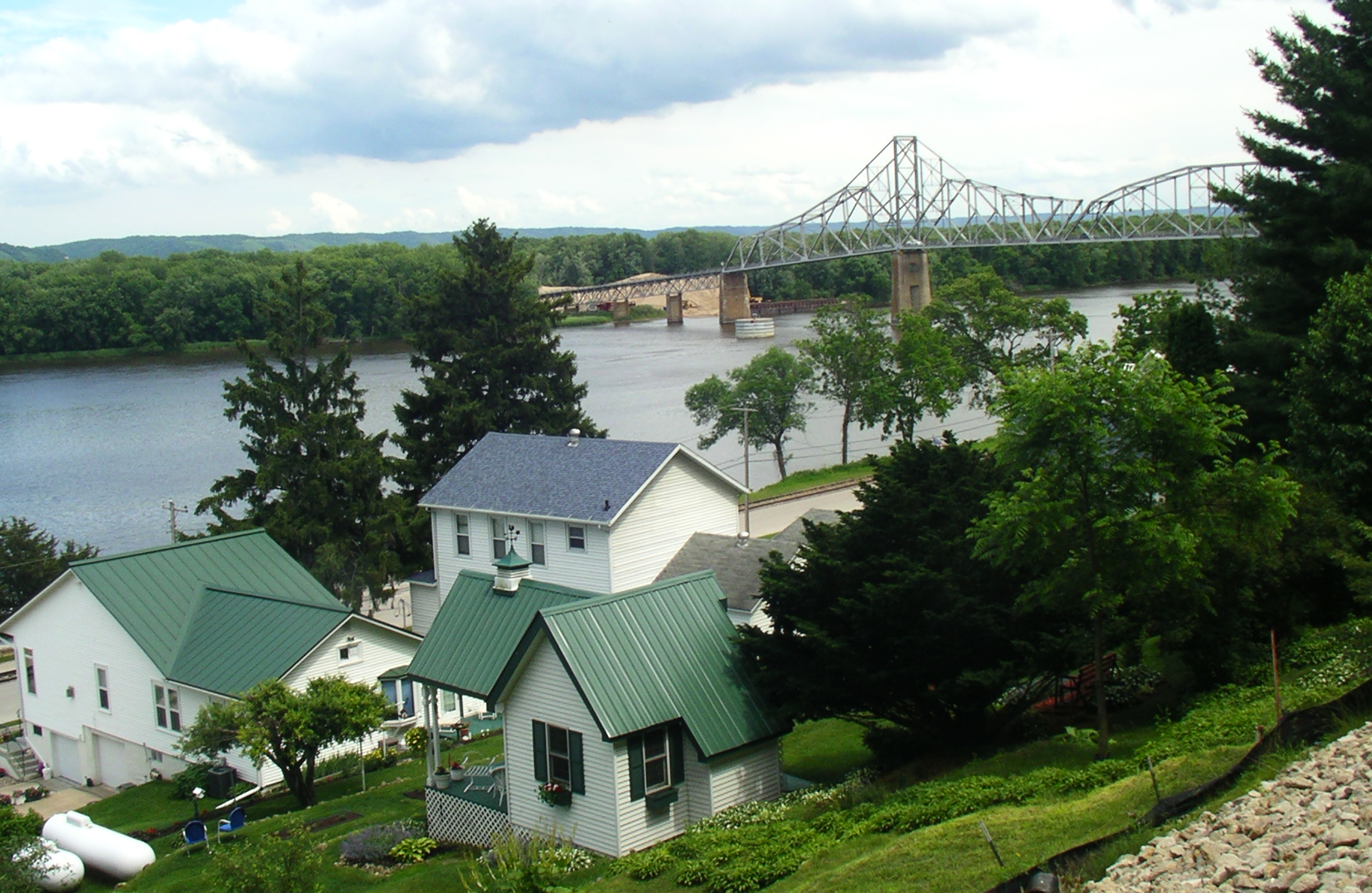
- The Black Hawk Bridge in Lansing
- Motto: Where Main Street Meets The Mississippi
- Location of Lansing, Iowa
- Coordinates: 43°21′51″N 91°13′44″W
- Country: United States
- State: Iowa
- County: Allamakee
- Township: Lansing
- Platted: circa 1851
- Incorporated: July 1, 1867
- Named for: Lansing, Michigan

Area
  - Total: 1.17 sq mi (3.03 km^{2})
  - Land: 1.07 sq mi (2.76 km^{2})
  - Water: 0.10 sq mi (0.27 km^{2})
- Elevation: 633 ft (193 m)

Population (2020)
  - Total: 968
  - Density: 908.8/sq mi (350.89/km^{2})
- Time zone: UTC-6 (Central (CST))
  - Summer (DST): UTC-5 (CDT)
- ZIP code: 52151
- Area code: 563
- FIPS code: 19-43275
- GNIS feature ID: 2395631
- Website: www.lansingiowa.com

Lansing is a city in Lansing Township, Allamakee County, Iowa, United States. The population was 968 at the time of the 2020 census.

== History ==
Lansing was platted circa 1851. The city was so named because the first settler was a native of Lansing, Michigan. Lansing became incorporated as a city on July 1, 1867.

Joseph "Diamond Jo" Reynolds, namesake of the famous Diamond Jo steamship line, built his first boat in Lansing and named it for the town.

On December 20, 2025, the Black Hawk Bridge was demolished using explosives due to unsafe conditions such as shaking and creaking on the 94 year old bridge.

== Geography ==
According to the United States Census Bureau, the city has a total area of 1.18 square miles (3.06 km^{2}), of which 1.08 square miles (2.80 km^{2}) is land and 0.10 square miles (0.26 km^{2}) is water.

Mount Hosmer is located on the north end of Lansing.

== Demographics ==
Historical populations
Year	Pop.	±%
1870	1,755	—
1880	1,811	+3.2%
1890	1,668	−7.9%
1900	1,438	−13.8%
1910	1,542	+7.2%
1920	1,447	−6.2%
1930	1,321	−8.7%
1940	1,388	+5.1%
1950	1,536	+10.7%
1960	1,325	−13.7%
1970	1,227	−7.4%
1980	1,181	−3.7%
1990	1,007	−14.7%
2000	1,012	+0.5%
2010	999	−1.3%
2020	968	−3.1%
Source:"U.S. Census website". United States Census Bureau. and Iowa Data Center; Source: U.S. Decennial Census

=== 2020 census ===
As of the census of 2020, there were 968 people, 442 households, and 235 families residing in the city. The population density was 908.8 inhabitants per square mile (350.9/km^{2}). There were 639 housing units at an average density of 599.9 per square mile (231.6/km^{2}). The racial makeup of the city was 96.1% White, 0.8% Black or African American, 0.0% Native American, 0.8% Asian, 0.0% Pacific Islander, 0.2% from other races and 2.1% from two or more races. Hispanic or Latino persons of any race comprised 0.8% of the population.

Of the 442 households, 21.3% of which had children under the age of 18 living with them, 43.2% were married couples living together, 8.1% were cohabitating couples, 25.1% had a female householder with no spouse or partner present and 23.5% had a male householder with no spouse or partner present. 46.8% of all households were non-families. 39.8% of all households were made up of individuals, 21.0% had someone living alone who was 65 years old or older.

The median age in the city was 53.0 years. 19.7% of the residents were under the age of 20; 3.6% were between the ages of 20 and 24; 17.4% were from 25 and 44; 27.8% were from 45 and 64; and 31.5% were 65 years of age or older. The gender makeup of the city was 49.5% male and 50.5% female.

=== 2010 census ===
As of the census of 2010, there were 999 people, 451 households, and 257 families living in the city. The population density was 925.0 inhabitants per square mile (357.1/km^{2}). There were 598 housing units at an average density of 553.7 per square mile (213.8/km^{2}). The racial makeup of the city was 98.8% White, 0.1% African American, 0.2% Native American, 0.4% Asian, 0.4% from other races, and 0.1% from two or more races. Hispanic or Latino of any race were 0.6% of the population.

There were 451 households, of which 22.6% had children under the age of 18 living with them, 45.5% were married couples living together, 7.5% had a female householder with no husband present, 4.0% had a male householder with no wife present, and 43.0% were non-families. 37.5% of all households were made up of individuals, and 16.4% had someone living alone who was 65 years of age or older. The average household size was 2.10 and the average family size was 2.74.

The median age in the city was 50.9 years. 17.9% of residents were under the age of 18; 5.8% were between the ages of 18 and 24; 18.4% were from 25 to 44; 30.8% were from 45 to 64; and 27% were 65 years of age or older. The gender makeup of the city was 49.5% male and 50.5% female.

=== 2000 census ===
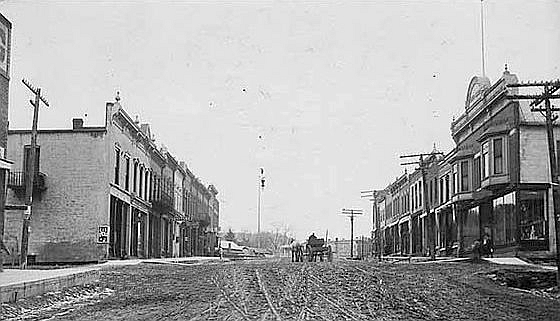
Main Street, 1913

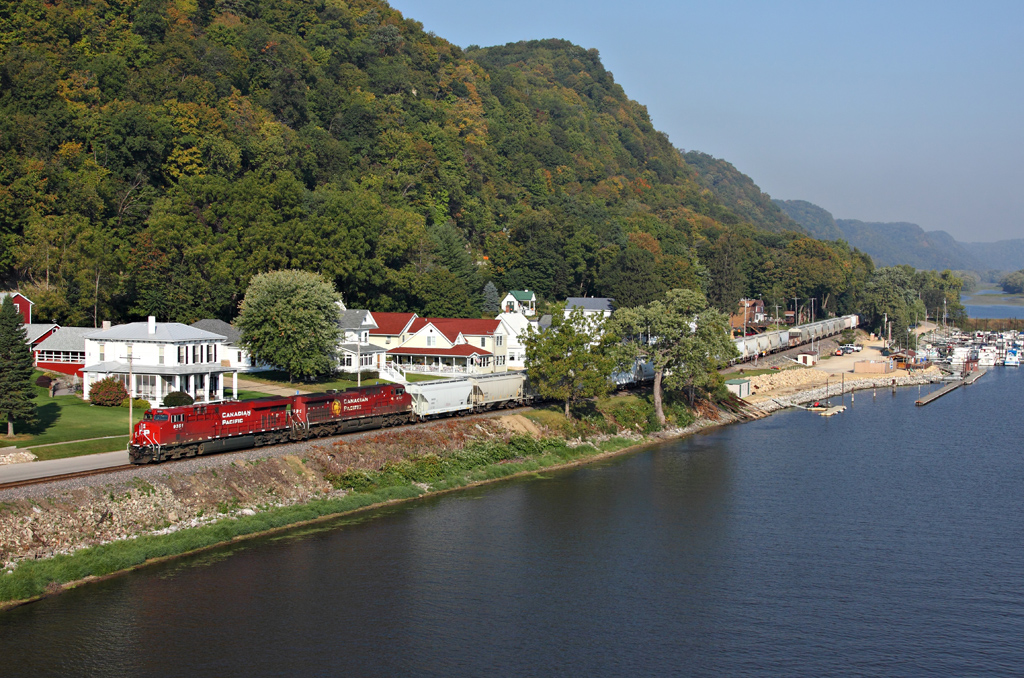
Lansing across the Mississippi River

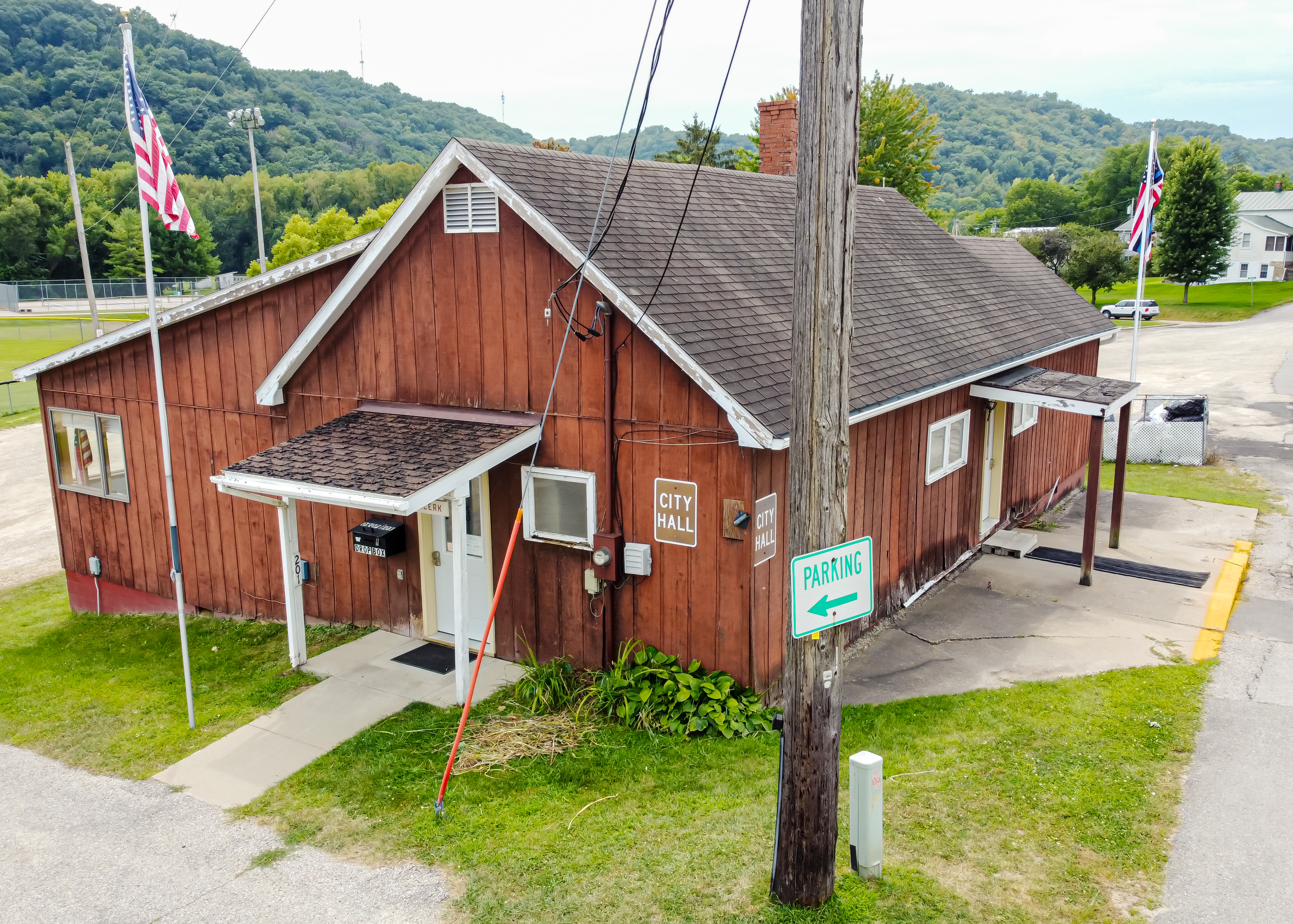
City hall

As of the census of 2000, there were 1,012 people, 441 households, and 258 families living in the city. The population density was 939.4 inhabitants per square mile (362.7/km^{2}). There were 573 housing units at an average density of 531.9 per square mile (205.4/km^{2}). The racial makeup of the city was 99.01% White, 0.10% African American, 0.40% Asian, 0.49% from other races. Hispanic or Latino of any race were 0.59% of the population.

There were 441 households, out of which 22.9% had children under the age of 18 living with them, 48.1% were married couples living together, 7.9% had a female householder with no husband present, and 41.3% were non-families. 37.4% of all households were made up of individuals, and 19.5% had someone living alone who was 65 years of age or older. The average household size was 2.17 and the average family size was 2.87.

Age spread: 20.7% under the age of 18, 5.6% from 18 to 24, 21.9% from 25 to 44, 24.5% from 45 to 64, and 27.3% who were 65 years of age or older. The median age was 46 years. For every 100 females, there were 87.4 males. For every 100 females age 18 and over, there were 86.7 males.

The median income for a household in the city was $29,482, and the median income for a family was $34,519. Males had a median income of $26,510 versus $17,596 for females. The per capita income for the city was $17,372. About 4.2% of families and 6.8% of the population were below the poverty line, including 1.7% of those under age 18 and 12.4% of those age 65 or over.

== Arts and culture ==
Attractions include:

- Old Stone School – Built in 1864
- Commercial Fishing Museum – Displays Lansing's history as a fishing town including commercial fishing, the pearl button industry, and ice harvesting.
- Black Hawk Bridge – Built in 1931
- Mount Hosmer – Named for artist Harriet Hosmer after she climbed to the peak in 1851.
- Allamakee County Historical Society Museum

The Waukon Standard is the local newspaper.

== Education ==
The Eastern Allamakee Community School District operates local public schools.

- New Albin Elementary School
- Lansing Middle School
- Kee High School

== Infrastructure ==
Passenger train service was provided to Lansing throughout its early history. Trains ran from La Crosse along the west bank of the Mississippi River through Lansing to Dubuque. This service gradually decreased in the first half of the twentieth century and was discontinued on June 8, 1951.

Lansing is served by Iowa Highway 9, which terminates on the Black Hawk Bridge leading to Wisconsin. Beginning in 2017, the Iowa Department of Transportation revealed plans to replace the Black Hawk Bridge with construction beginning in 2024. The Black Hawk Bridge was imploded on December 20, 2025.

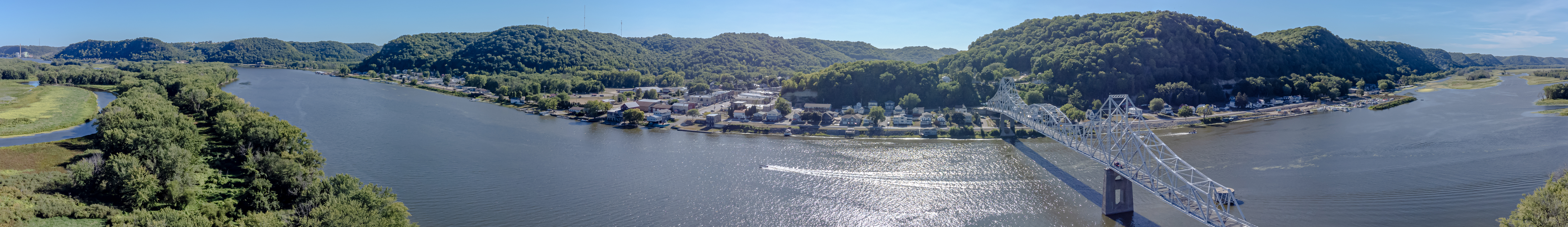
Lansing

== Notable people ==
- James Isham Gilbert - Union general during Civil War; settled in Iowa in 1851 where he helped found the town of Lansing.
- Edwin G. Krebs - co-recipient of 1992 Nobel Prize in Medicine.

== See also ==
- Lansing Township
