= Featherlite Trailers =

Featherlite Inc.
- Type: Private
- Industry: Trailers
- Founded: 1973
- Headquarters: Cresco, Iowa USA
- Website: www.fthr.com

Featherlite Trailers is an all-aluminum trailer manufacturer, located in Cresco, Iowa. It is one of the oldest all-aluminum trailer brands in the United States with the oldest being Trailex, and today manufactures horse trailers and a range of specialty trailers.

== History ==
The company was established in 1973 in Oklahoma, when it built the first all-aluminum gooseneck livestock trailer. In 1988 the company was acquired by Conrad Climent, Featherlite Manufacturing of Grand Meadow, Minnesota, relocating to Cresco, Iowa in 1993.

The company created the first ever custom aluminum race car semi trailer for NASCAR racer Dale Earnhardt and team owner Richard Childress. Today Featherlite is the official trailer of NASCAR, supplying 85% of the NASCAR Sprint Cup teams.

The Featherlite brand was acquired on December 31, 2019 by a newly formed corporation, Featherlite Trailer Manufacturing, LLC, owned by Tim Masud and Howard Palmer.

== Products ==
Featherlite manufactures a range of all-aluminum trailers, mainly using aluminum alloys. Types of trailers include horse trailers, livestock trailers, living quarters trailers, car trailers and utility trailers. Featherlite's Specialty Trailers division manufactures custom trailers for professional sports teams, medical businesses, the aerospace industry, government services, the U.S. military and many others.

== Sponsorships ==
- NASCAR
