= Northeast Iowa Conference =

Iowa High School athletic conference

- Conference: IHSAA / IGHSAU
- Founded: 1920
- Sports fielded: 18
- No. of teams: 2
- Region: Northeast Iowa
- Website: www.northeastiaconference.org

North East Iowa Conference School Locations

The Northeast Iowa Conference (NEIC) was a two school athletic conference made up of mid-sized schools in the Northeast Corner of Iowa. The conference dates in 1920, making it one of Iowa's oldest existing athletic conferences.

== Members ==
Departing members highlighted in red.

Institution	Location	Mascot	Colors	Affiliation	2024-2025 BEDS
Charles City	Charles City	Comets		Public	383
Decorah	Decorah	Vikings		Public	435

Waverly-Shell Rock will be removed from the NEIC as of June 30, 2023, due to an imbalance of enrollment when compared to the other members. Likely landing spots for the school include the Iowa Alliance Conference or the Mississippi Valley Conference Waverly-Shell Rock will compete as an independent in the 2024-2025 school year. The school attempted to join the WaMaC Conference for the 2025-2026 school year, but was denied, leaving the future of the school's athletic competition uncertain.

In January 2024, Howard-Winneshiek School District (Crestwood High School) agreed to join the Upper Iowa Conference, leaving the NEIC with 4 members in the 2025-2026 school year.

2 weeks after Crestwood High School announced it would leave the NEIC, both New Hampton School District and Allamakee School District (Waukon High School) announced their acceptance into the Upper Iowa Conference. Their admission would also be effective for the 2025-2026 school year.

Charles City School District attempted to join the North Central Conference (Iowa), but was rejected. The school district has asked for state mediation for acceptance into the conference. On July 23, 2024, the North Central Conference announced that Charles City would be a transitional member for the 2025-2026 and 2026-2027 school years, and a full member beginning in the 2027-2028 school year.

Decorah Community School District also attempted to join the Upper Iowa Conference but was denied as well. Decorah also appealed for state intervention, but ultimately lost, forcing Decorah to become independent for the foreseeable future.

== Invited Members ==
The following school districts were invited to the NEIC on April 25 for the 2023-24 school year. All schools have since declined invitation.

Institution	Location	Mascot	Colors	Affiliation	2022-2023 BEDS	Class	Current Conference
MFL-MarMac	Monona	Bulldogs		Public	187	1A	Upper Iowa
North Fayette Valley	West Union	Tigerhawks		Public	249	2A	Upper Iowa
Oelwein	Oelwein	Huskies		Public	266	2A	NICL
Osage	Osage	Green Devils		Public	226	2A	Top of Iowa
Sumner-Fredericksburg	Sumner	Cougars		Public	202	2A	NICL

Oelwein and Osage were formerly charter members. Osage left the conference in 1958, Oelwein in 2021

== History ==
The NEIC was founded in 1920 by seven schools in northeastern Iowa. These seven schools were Charles City, Cresco, Decorah, New Hampton, Oelwein, Osage, and Waverly. All of the schools were located in some of the largest cities in Northeastern Iowa and most were located in their respective county seats. Cedar Falls joined the league in or around 1948, pushing membership to eight. By the early-1960s, Osage and Cedar Falls had left the conference to join a more local and a larger conference, respectively. Cresco also merged with other small area schools to become Crestwood High School around this time, while the small Shell Rock district joined Waverly. The membership of the conference stayed at six for a few years until Allamakee School District in Waukon joined the conference. Membership has been the same since at least 1970. As of 2011, all of the schools are either 3A or 2A by classification, Iowa's second and third largest classes. New Hampton has been a 2A school since 2010, and Waukon moved to class 2A in 2012. 2021-22, Oelwein left for the NICL leaving the conference with 6 members
