= Ridgeway, Iowa =

- City
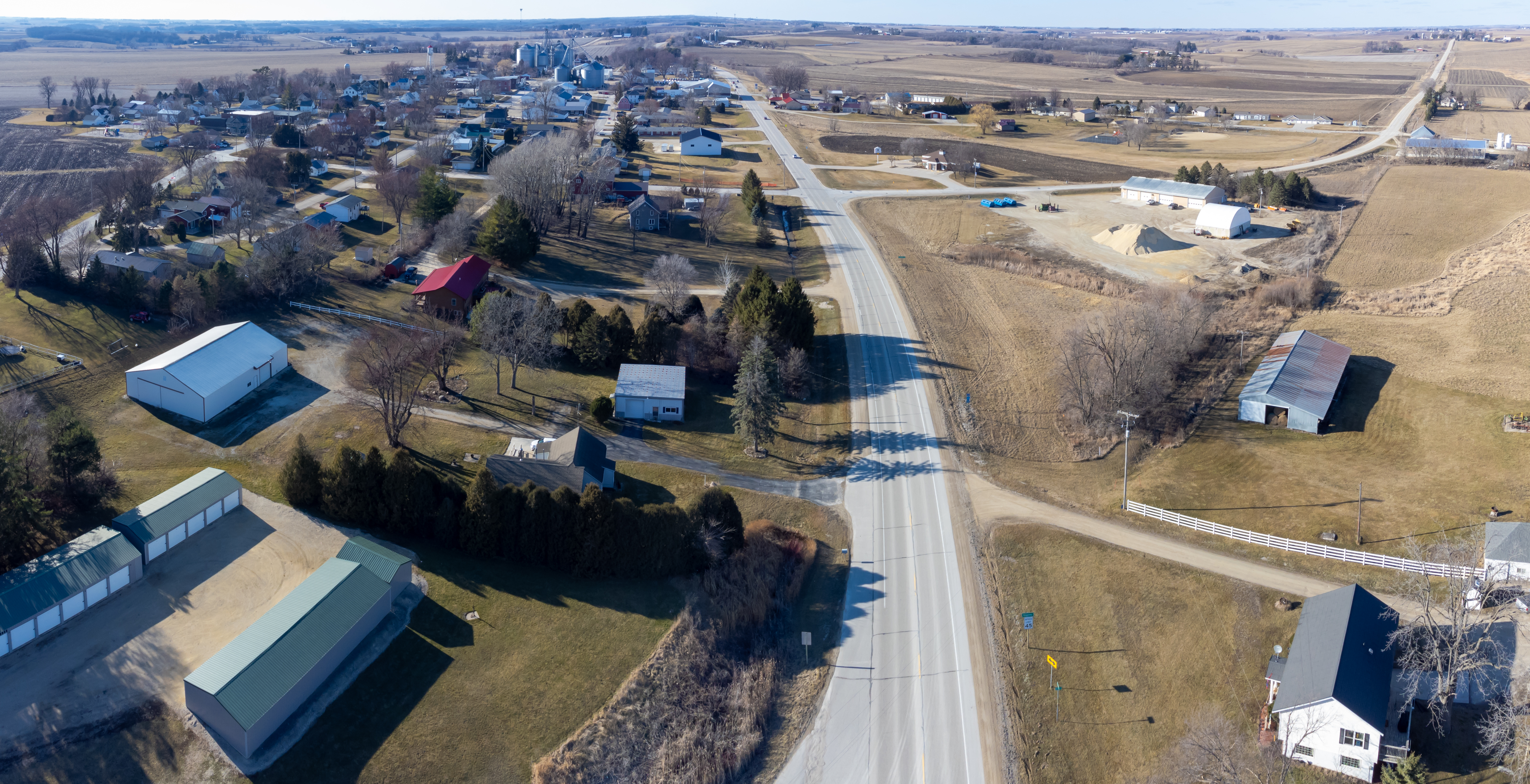
- IA-9 runs through town

- Location of Ridgeway, Iowa
- Coordinates: 43°17′52″N 91°59′21″W
- Country: United States
- State: Iowa
- County: Winneshiek
- Incorporated: March 15, 1894

Area
  - Total: 0.76 sq mi (1.96 km^{2})
  - Land: 0.76 sq mi (1.96 km^{2})
  - Water: 0 sq mi (0.00 km^{2})
- Elevation: 1,198 ft (365 m)

Population (2020)
  - Total: 275
  - Density: 364.3/sq mi (140.66/km^{2})
- Time zone: UTC-6 (Central (CST))
  - Summer (DST): UTC-5 (CDT)
- ZIP code: 52165
- Area code: 563
- FIPS code: 19-67035
- GNIS feature ID: 0460629

Ridgeway is a city in Winneshiek County, Iowa, United States. The population was 275 at the time of the 2020 census. Ridgeway's post office was established in 1867.

== Geography ==
Ridgeway is located at 43°17′52″N 91°59′21″W (43.297884, -91.989187).

According to the United States Census Bureau, the city has a total area of 1.02 square miles (2.64 km^{2}), all land.

== Demographics ==
Historical populations
Year	Pop.	±%
1900	371	—
1910	354	−4.6%
1920	349	−1.4%
1930	348	−0.3%
1940	323	−7.2%
1950	307	−5.0%
1960	267	−13.0%
1970	218	−18.4%
1980	308	+41.3%
1990	295	−4.2%
2000	293	−0.7%
2010	315	+7.5%
2020	275	−12.7%
Source:"U.S. Census website". United States Census Bureau. and Iowa Data Center; Source: U.S. Decennial Census

=== 2020 census ===
As of the census of 2020, there were 275 people, 134 households, and 68 families residing in the city. The population density was 364.3 inhabitants per square mile (140.7/km^{2}). There were 140 housing units at an average density of 185.5 per square mile (71.6/km^{2}). The racial makeup of the city was 92.4% White, 0.4% Black or African American, 0.0% Native American, 0.0% Asian, 0.0% Pacific Islander, 4.7% from other races and 2.5% from two or more races. Hispanic or Latino persons of any race comprised 6.5% of the population.

Of the 134 households, 27.6% of which had children under the age of 18 living with them, 39.6% were married couples living together, 14.9% were cohabitating couples, 20.9% had a female householder with no spouse or partner present and 24.6% had a male householder with no spouse or partner present. 49.3% of all households were non-families. 32.1% of all households were made up of individuals, 16.4% had someone living alone who was 65 years old or older.

The median age in the city was 37.3 years. 20.7% of the residents were under the age of 20; 9.8% were between the ages of 20 and 24; 26.9% were from 25 and 44; 24.4% were from 45 and 64; and 18.2% were 65 years of age or older. The gender makeup of the city was 50.2% male and 49.8% female.

=== 2010 census ===
As of the census of 2010, there were 315 people, 138 households, and 77 families living in the city. The population density was 308.8 inhabitants per square mile (119.2/km^{2}). There were 147 housing units at an average density of 144.1 per square mile (55.6/km^{2}). The racial makeup of the city was 99.7% White and 0.3% from two or more races.

There were 138 households, of which 29.0% had children under the age of 18 living with them, 46.4% were married couples living together, 4.3% had a female householder with no husband present, 5.1% had a male householder with no wife present, and 44.2% were non-families. 34.8% of all households were made up of individuals, and 13.8% had someone living alone who was 65 years of age or older. The average household size was 2.28 and the average family size was 3.03.

The median age in the city was 32.4 years. 24.8% of residents were under the age of 18; 9.4% were between the ages of 18 and 24; 26.9% were from 25 to 44; 23.1% were from 45 to 64; and 15.6% were 65 years of age or older. The gender makeup of the city was 50.8% male and 49.2% female.

=== 2000 census ===
As of the census of 2000, there were 293 people, 124 households, and 80 families living in the city. The population density was 276.0 inhabitants per square mile (106.6/km^{2}). There were 137 housing units at an average density of 129.1 per square mile (49.8/km^{2}). The racial makeup of the city was 99.66% White and 0.34% African American. Hispanic or Latino of any race were 1.37% of the population.

There were 124 households, out of which 27.4% had children under the age of 18 living with them, 54.0% were married couples living together, 7.3% had a female householder with no husband present, and 34.7% were non-families. 29.8% of all households were made up of individuals, and 13.7% had someone living alone who was 65 years of age or older. The average household size was 2.36 and the average family size was 2.91.

In the city, the population was spread out, with 22.5% under the age of 18, 13.0% from 18 to 24, 25.6% from 25 to 44, 19.1% from 45 to 64, and 19.8% who were 65 years of age or older. The median age was 39 years. For every 100 females, there were 91.5 males. For every 100 females age 18 and over, there were 84.6 males.

The median income for a household in the city was $33,750, and the median income for a family was $42,500. Males had a median income of $25,750 versus $17,188 for females. The per capita income for the city was $15,206. About 2.6% of families and 8.2% of the population were below the poverty line, including 4.3% of those under the age of eighteen and 11.8% of those 65 or over.

== Education ==
Howard–Winneshiek Community School District operates public schools. The district was formed from the merger of the Cresco, Lime Springs/Chester, Elma, and Ridgeway school districts, opening on July 1, 1960.

In 2008 Ridgeway Elementary School closed. The Ridgeway city government bought the school in 2010. In 2011 Sherill and Jeff Ryan bought the school and converted it into a shrimp farm.

== Notable person ==
- Drengman Aaker, Iowa businessman and state legislator, lived in Ridgeway.
