= Monona, Iowa =

- City
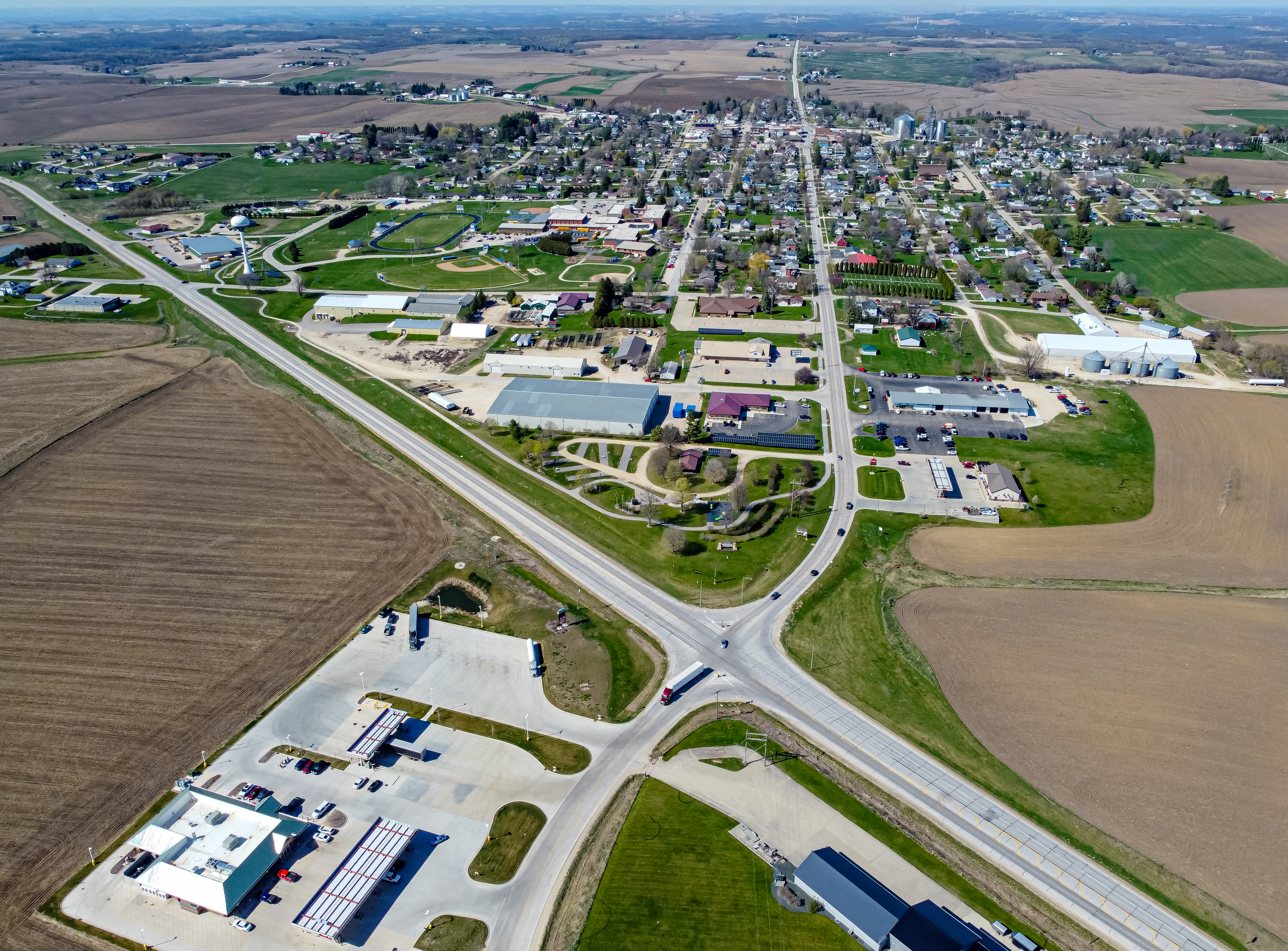
- US-18 runs by town
- Motto: The Garden City.
- Location of Monona, Iowa
- Coordinates: 43°02′59″N 91°23′28″W
- Country: United States
- State: Iowa
- County: Clayton

Area
  - Total: 1.29 sq mi (3.33 km^{2})
  - Land: 1.29 sq mi (3.33 km^{2})
  - Water: 0 sq mi (0.00 km^{2})
- Elevation: 1,188 ft (362 m)

Population (2020)
  - Total: 1,471
  - Density: 1,143/sq mi (441.2/km^{2})
- Time zone: UTC-6 (Central (CST))
  - Summer (DST): UTC-5 (CDT)
- ZIP code: 52159
- Area code: 563
- FIPS code: 19-53310
- GNIS feature ID: 2395373
- Website: City of Monona Website

Monona is a city in Clayton County, Iowa, United States. The population was 1,471 at the time of the 2020 census.

== History ==
The name Monona is of American native origin.

The Monona Post Office was established in 1849 and the city was incorporated May 11, 1897. In 1916, Monona contained a public house, two stores, and several mechanic shops.

== Geography ==
Monona is located at 43°3′5″N 91°23′26″W (43.051258, -91.390529).

According to the United States Census Bureau, the city has a total area of 1.17 square miles (3.03 km^{2}), all land.

== Demographics ==
Historical populations
Year	Pop.	±%
1880	420	—
1890	460	+9.5%
1900	674	+46.5%
1910	792	+17.5%
1920	1,049	+32.4%
1930	1,163	+10.9%
1940	1,191	+2.4%
1950	1,346	+13.0%
1960	1,346	+0.0%
1970	1,395	+3.6%
1980	1,530	+9.7%
1990	1,520	−0.7%
2000	1,550	+2.0%
2010	1,549	−0.1%
2020	1,471	−5.0%
Source:"U.S. Census website". United States Census Bureau. and Iowa Data Center; Source: U.S. Decennial Census

=== 2020 census ===
As of the 2020 census, Monona had a population of 1,471. The population density was 1,142.8 inhabitants per square mile (441.2/km^{2}), and the housing unit density was 559.3 per square mile (216.0/km^{2}).

The median age was 42.0 years. 23.0% of residents were under the age of 18 and 21.1% were 65 years of age or older. 24.6% of residents were under the age of 20; 3.3% were between the ages of 20 and 24; 25.2% were from 25 to 44; and 25.8% were from 45 to 64. The gender makeup of the city was 48.9% male and 51.1% female. For every 100 females there were 95.6 males, and for every 100 females age 18 and over there were 90.1 males age 18 and over.

0.0% of residents lived in urban areas, while 100.0% lived in rural areas.

There were 671 households, of which 25.0% had children under the age of 18 living in them. Of all households, 46.2% were married-couple households, 8.5% were cohabitating couples, 18.6% were households with a male householder and no spouse or partner present, and 26.7% were households with a female householder and no spouse or partner present. 41.6% of households were non-families. About 36.1% of all households were made up of individuals and 18.2% had someone living alone who was 65 years of age or older.

There were 720 housing units, of which 6.8% were vacant. The homeowner vacancy rate was 2.0% and the rental vacancy rate was 10.3%.

Racial composition as of the 2020 census
Race	Number	Percent
White	1,416	96.3%
Black or African American	4	0.3%
American Indian and Alaska Native	1	0.1%
Asian	10	0.7%
Native Hawaiian and Other Pacific Islander	0	0.0%
Some other race	1	0.1%
Two or more races	39	2.7%
Hispanic or Latino (of any race)	16	1.1%

=== 2010 census ===
At the 2010 census there were 1,549 people, 675 households, and 440 families living in the city. The population density was 1,323.9 inhabitants per square mile (511.2/km^{2}). There were 725 housing units at an average density of 619.7 per square mile (239.3/km^{2}). The racial makeup of the city was 98.3% White, 0.5% African American, 0.1% Native American, 0.3% Asian, 0.3% from other races, and 0.6% from two or more races. Hispanic or Latino of any race were 1.0%.

Of the 675 households, 29.5% had children under the age of 18 living with them, 52.1% were married couples living together, 8.7% had a female householder with no husband present, 4.3% had a male householder with no wife present, and 34.8% were non-families. 30.8% of households were one person and 16.6% were one person aged 65 or older. The average household size was 2.29 and the average family size was 2.83.

The median age was 42.4 years. 23.6% of residents were under the age of 18; 6.9% were between the ages of 18 and 24; 22.7% were from 25 to 44; 26.5% were from 45 to 64; and 20.2% were 65 or older. The gender makeup of the city was 48.5% male and 51.5% female.

=== 2000 census ===
At the 2000 census there were 1,550 people, 659 households, and 432 families living in the city. The population density was 1,344.6 inhabitants per square mile (519.2/km^{2}). There were 706 housing units at an average density of 612.4 per square mile (236.4/km^{2}). The racial makeup of the city was 98.65% White, 0.06% African American, 0.58% Native American, 0.39% Asian, and 0.32% from two or more races. Hispanic or Latino of any race were 0.06%.

Of the 659 households, 28.7% had children under the age of 18 living with them, 55.4% were married couples living together, 5.8% had a female householder with no husband present, and 34.4% were non-families. 30.3% of households were one person and 19.0% were one person aged 65 or older. The average household size was 2.35 and the average family size was 2.93.

Age spread: 24.1% under the age of 18, 6.5% from 18 to 24, 26.9% from 25 to 44, 19.2% from 45 to 64, and 23.4% 65 or older. The median age was 40 years. For every 100 females, there were 90.9 males. For every 100 females age 18 and over, there were 89.7 males.

The median household income was $35,000 and the median family income was $42,679. Males had a median income of $28,942 versus $19,954 for females. The per capita income for the city was $18,746. About 5.2% of families and 7.3% of the population were below the poverty line, including 6.2% of those under age 18 and 9.0% of those age 65 or over.

== Education ==
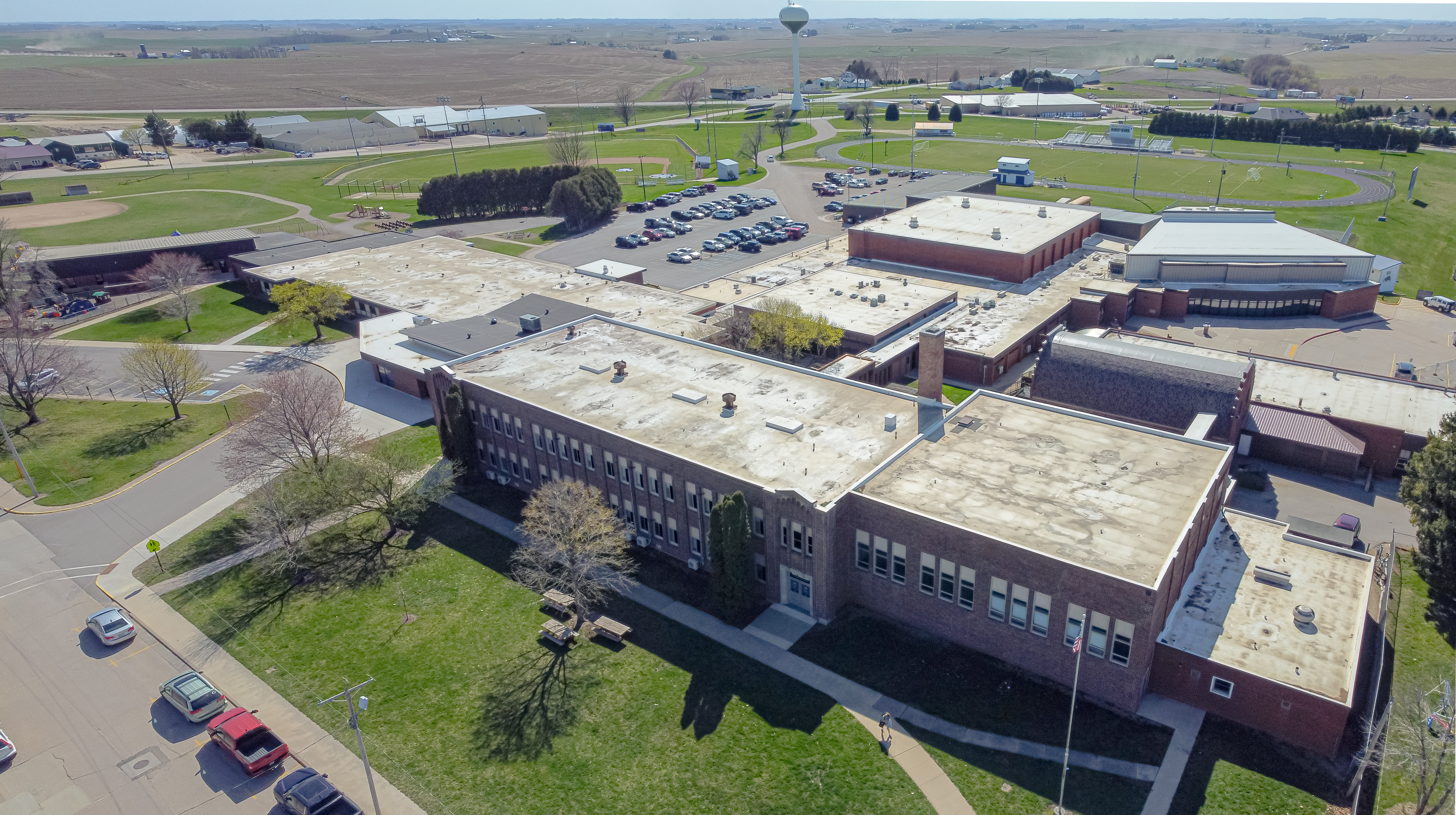
MFL MarMac High School in Monona

It is within the MFL MarMac Community School District. The district formed on July 1, 1994, with the merger of the Mar-Mac and M-F-L districts.

== Notable people ==
- Leighton Abel, Iowa state politician and businessman
- Alexander Gardner, photographer
- Raef LaFrentz, basketball player
