= National Register of Historic Places listings in Lincoln County, South Dakota =

Location of Lincoln County in South Dakota

This is a list of the National Register of Historic Places listings in Lincoln County, South Dakota.

This is intended to be a complete list of the properties and districts on the National Register of Historic Places in Lincoln County, South Dakota, United States. The locations of National Register properties and districts for which the latitude and longitude coordinates are included below, may be seen in a map.

There are 28 properties and districts listed on the National Register in the county, including 1 National Historic Landmark. Another 2 properties were once listed but have been removed.

This National Park Service list is complete through NPS recent listings posted October 16, 2026.

== Current listings ==
	Name on the Register	Image	Date listed	Location	City or town	Description
1	Dr. Andrew Anderson House	Dr. Andrew Anderson House	February 5, 2003 (#02001765)	416 E. 2nd St. 43°18′14″N 96°35′18″W	Canton	
2	Magnus O. Bergstrom House	Magnus O. Bergstrom House	March 17, 1994 (#94000196)	415 S. Cedar; 43°17′43″N 96°36′08″W	Canton	
3	Blood Run Site	Blood Run Site	August 29, 1970 (#70000246)	On the Iowa/South Dakota border along the Big Sioux River; 43°30′01″N 96°35′49″W	Canton	Extends into Lyon County, Iowa
4	Brooklyn School District No. 42	Brooklyn School District No. 42	December 15, 2004 (#04001364)	29534 468th Ave. 43°06′34″N 96°50′41″W	Beresford	
5	Byrnes House	Byrnes House	November 18, 2009 (#09000946)	525 N. Broadway St. 43°18′17″N 96°35′29″W	Canton	
6	Canton Asylum for American Indians Cemetery	Canton Asylum for American Indians Cemetery	February 20, 1998 (#98000074)	North of the junction of U.S. Route 18 and the former Chicago, Milwaukee, St. Paul and Pacific railroad tracks 43°18′20″N 96°33′04″W	Canton	At least 121 burials at this cemetery are dated from the existence of the Asylum, which was open from 1898 to 1934.
7	Canton Carnegie Library	Canton Carnegie Library	December 6, 2016 (#16000826)	225 E. 4th St. 43°18′06″N 96°35′28″W	Canton	
8	Canton Lutheran Church	Canton Lutheran Church	May 30, 2002 (#02000582)	124 E. 2nd St. 43°18′14″N 96°35′30″W	Canton	
9	Anthon W. Elster House	Anthon W. Elster House	June 28, 2010 (#10000412)	27765 476th Ave. 43°21′52″N 96°41′18″W	Canton	
10	Dickens Round Barn	Dickens Round Barn	March 11, 2019 (#100003439)	27882 473rd Ave. 43°20′50″N 96°44′24″W	Worthing vicinity	
11	Gale Buildings	Gale Buildings	June 27, 2019 (#100004126)	101 and 103-107 S. Main; 43°18′03″N 96°35′34″W	Canton	
12	Grand Valley Schoolhouse, District No. 12	Grand Valley Schoolhouse, District No. 12	March 3, 1997 (#97000143)	47872 285th St. 43°15′28″N 96°38′16″W	Canton	
13	Hansen-Hagedorn Barn	Hansen-Hagedorn Barn	December 11, 2013 (#13000916)	46954 272nd St. 43°26′50″N 96°48′57″W	Tea	
14	Harney Hospital	Harney Hospital	August 1, 1984 (#84003341)	305 S. Main St. 43°21′11″N 96°53′31″W	Lennox	
15	Hudson Boy Scout Cabin	Hudson Boy Scout Cabin	June 18, 2009 (#09000448)	416 Wheelock St. 43°07′48″N 96°27′17″W	Hudson	
16	John Isakson House	John Isakson House	August 1, 1984 (#84003342)	504 E. 3rd St. 43°18′11″N 96°35′14″W	Canton	
17	C. B. Kennedy Mansion	C. B. Kennedy Mansion	February 9, 2001 (#01000093)	903 N. Dakota St. 43°18′30″N 96°35′22″W	Canton	
18	Norway Center Store	Norway Center Store	May 30, 2003 (#03000496)	29339 Highway 11; 43°07′39″N 96°37′44″W	Hudson	Private residence, as of 2015
19	Old Main, Augustana Academy	Old Main, Augustana Academy	December 2, 1985 (#85003093)	Lawler and 2nd Sts. 43°18′13″N 96°34′43″W	Canton	
20	Penmarch Place	Penmarch Place	February 26, 1987 (#87000220)	Penmarch Place, RD 1, Box 142; 43°29′58″N 96°43′33″W	Sioux Falls	
21	Rudolph-Parke House	Rudolph-Parke House	September 14, 2001 (#01001000)	412 E. 1st St. 43°18′17″N 96°35′18″W	Canton	
22	Mathias Schmid Farm		December 15, 2004 (#04001367)	47405 293rd St. 43°08′35″N 96°43′32″W	Beresford	
23	Skartvedt House	Skartvedt House	February 18, 2000 (#00000121)	224 E. 2nd St. 43°18′14″N 96°35′26″W	Canton	
24	South Dakota Dept of Trans. Bridge No. 42-200-125	South Dakota Dept of Trans. Bridge No. 42-200-125	May 30, 2002 (#02000580)	Three Mile Rd. 43°19′27″N 96°31′45″W	Canton	No longer extant per aerial view.
25	J. W. Taylor House	J. W. Taylor House	August 16, 2000 (#00001001)	308 N. Broadway St. 43°18′11″N 96°35′28″W	Canton	
26	Peder and Helga Tuntland Farmstead		March 17, 1994 (#94000194)	Roughly 10 miles northwest of Beresford; 43°09′50″N 96°39′48″W	Beresford	
27	Ulrickson Barn	Ulrickson Barn	August 25, 2005 (#05000946)	Highway 11 29350; 43°08′04″N 96°37′19″W	Hudson	
28	Dr. Cyrus L. and Edna J. Wendt House	Dr. Cyrus L. and Edna J. Wendt House	September 5, 2025 (#100012207)	604 N. Broadway St. 43°18′20″N 96°35′29″W	Canton	

== Former listings ==
	Name on the Register	Image	Date listed	Date removed	Location	City or town	Description
1	Kruger Dam		May 1, 1979 (#79002404)	February 8, 2012	Northeast of Canton; 43°23′10″N 96°31′18″W	Canton	
2	South Dakota Department of Transportation Bridge No. 42-103-207		January 14, 2000 (#99001688)	March 26, 2008	Local road over local creek 43°06′46″N 96°43′10″W	Beresford	

== See also ==
- List of National Historic Landmarks in South Dakota
- National Register of Historic Places listings in South Dakota
