= Resurrection Lutheran Church =

Church in Redondo Beach, California

Coordinates: 33.81357°N 118.3864°W

Resurrection Lutheran Church (RLC) is a Lutheran congregation of the Evangelical Lutheran Church in America, located in Redondo Beach, California. The church offers both traditional and contemporary worship services, which are live-streamed for remote attendance. The church's pastor is Ken Johnson. Established on October 21, 1951, in response to population growth in the South Bay area, the church started with 99 members. RLC is also home to Riviera Hall Lutheran School, founded in 1952, and engages in various community service initiatives, including support for people experiencing homelessness, hosting benefit concerts, and organizing events to assist local families and communities.

== Church history ==
=== Early years and development ===
In the 1950s and 60s, South Bay (Los Angeles County) experienced significant population growth driven by the expansion of aerospace and related industries. In response to this demand, the Home Mission Department of the Evangelical Lutheran Church in America organized the Lutheran Church of the Resurrection on October 21, 1951, starting with 99 members and Pastor Lyle Gangsei.

Groundbreaking for the chapel took place on May 11, 1952, and the first worship service was held on November 3, 1952. This initial chapel later became Rygh Hall, named after Pastor Marvin Rygh, who served as the congregation's second pastor for 28 years. Rygh came from Canton Lutheran Church of Canton, South Dakota. He studied at St. Olaf College and Luther Seminary. He served in the United States Coast Guard and the United States Army during World War II. His first service was in 1957.

=== Growth and expansion ===
In 1958, the church hosted an event featuring Louis Zamperini, the Torrance High School track and Olympic star, and author of "Devil at My Heels." Known for surviving 47 days adrift in the Pacific Ocean after a plane crash during World War II and over two years of brutal captivity as a Japanese prisoner of war, Zamperini shared his experiences and insights as a Christian evangelist with the church community.

As the congregation grew in the early 1960s, plans for a larger church building emerged, leading to groundbreaking for the new sanctuary on March 10, 1963, which was dedicated on March 9, 1964. Membership peaked at over 1,800 in 1965, and while the official name remains Lutheran Church of the Resurrection, it is widely known as Resurrection Lutheran Church (RLC).

== Riviera Hall Lutheran School ==
The church also established an elementary school called Riviera Hall Lutheran School in 1952, which expanded to include grades K-8 by 1956 and currently serves over 200 students. Riviera Hall Lutheran Preschool was added in 1968. Former United States President Bill Clinton attended his nephew's graduation from Riviera Hall in 2008.

The school participates in a number of community activities. Students at the school have participated in Locks of Love. In 2019, fifth graders presented the idea of reusable biodegradable utensils as a sustainable solution to reduce plastic waste during their participation in the California National Geographic Society contest. Fathers with children at the school started a program called "Rad Dads" to enhance security.

Professional baseball player Morgan Ensberg attended Riviera Hall.

== Musical performances ==
In 1993, RLC hosted the Philippine Orphan's Choir for a presentation of "Never a Child," a three-act concert featuring gospel and traditional Filipino songs and dances, to benefit Filipino orphans living at the David Livingstone Missionary Foundation Children's Village in Cebu.

In 2007, the Watoto Children's Choir performed at the church. During this visit, parishioner Corina O’Neill hosted one of the children and gifted him drumsticks that sparked his passion for drumming. Years later, Kiyaga returned as a chaperone and drummer, crediting the church's support with guiding him to join a church band and earn a college degree].

== Art collection ==
In 2010, a member of the church discovered a rustic Crown of Thorns sculpture while searching the heater room, leading to an exploration of the church's collection of artwork by notable artists. The church subsequently showcased this collection, including the Crown of Thorns and works by former members, at a public art show, highlighting its historical significance.

== Community service ==
In 1990, RLC participated in a walk-a-thon to benefit people experiencing homelessness. In 2013, RLC held a benefit event on Saturday for a local family in need, featuring various activities such as a silent auction and food offerings.
