= James M. Wahl =

American politician

James M. Wahl (Given name: Jens Magnus Wahl) (January 7, 1846 - February 9, 1939) was a pioneer Norwegian American settler in South Dakota. He served as the first legislator of Lincoln County, South Dakota in the Dakota Territorial Legislature. Wahl named the city of Canton, South Dakota.

== Biography ==
Wahl was born at Storvahl in Nærøy Municipality in Nord-Trøndelag county, Norway. He was the son of Fredrik Andreas Jenssen (1814-1866) and Johanna Maria Mikkelsdatter (1825-1917). Wahl emigrated to La Crosse, Wisconsin in 1867 from Nord-Trøndelag County, Norway. He attended West Salem Seminary in La Crosse, Wisconsin and upon completion moved to Sioux Falls, South Dakota. He served as a guide to immigrants coming to Lincoln County, South Dakota from Norway for many years. He later moved to the Sioux Valley arriving on April 23, 1868, in Canton, South Dakota. He filed for a homestead on the very piece of property on which the county courthouse stands today.

Among many contributions to the community, Wahl assisted with the organization of Bethlehem Lutheran church (now Canton Lutheran Church), organized bringing the Augustana College from Beloit, Iowa to Sioux Falls, South Dakota and wrote a 277-page record of local settlement. He died in 1939, a citizen of the United States for 73 years.
