= Sisseton Carnegie Library =

- U.S. National Register of Historic Places
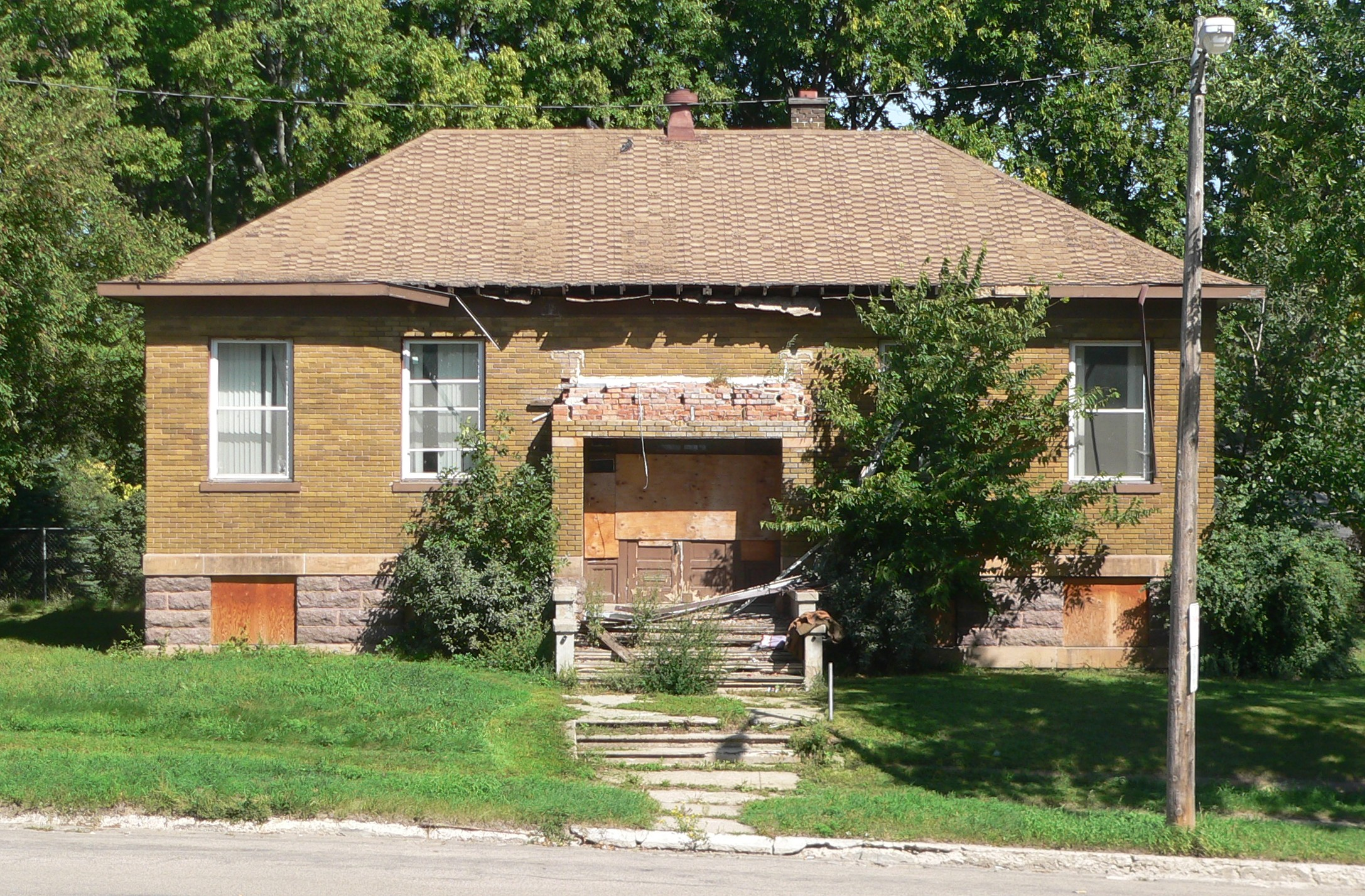

- Location within South Dakota Location within the United States
- Location: 215 Oak St., E., Sisseton, South Dakota
- Coordinates: 45°39′54″N 97°02′51″W
- Area: less than one acre
- Built: 1916
- Built by: Carlson & Hasslen
- Architect: George Issenhuth
- Architectural style: Classical Revival
- NRHP reference No.: 96001227
- Added to NRHP: October 24, 1996

The Sisseton Carnegie Library, located at 215 Oak Street, East, in Sisseton, South Dakota, is a Carnegie library built in 1916. It was listed on the National Register of Historic Places in 1996. It was by then also known as the Pohlen Center and as the Heritage Museum of Roberts County.

It is a Classical Revival-style brick building on a pink granite foundation. The architect was George Issenhuth of Huron.
