= Augustana Academy =

- Old Main
- U.S. National Register of Historic Places
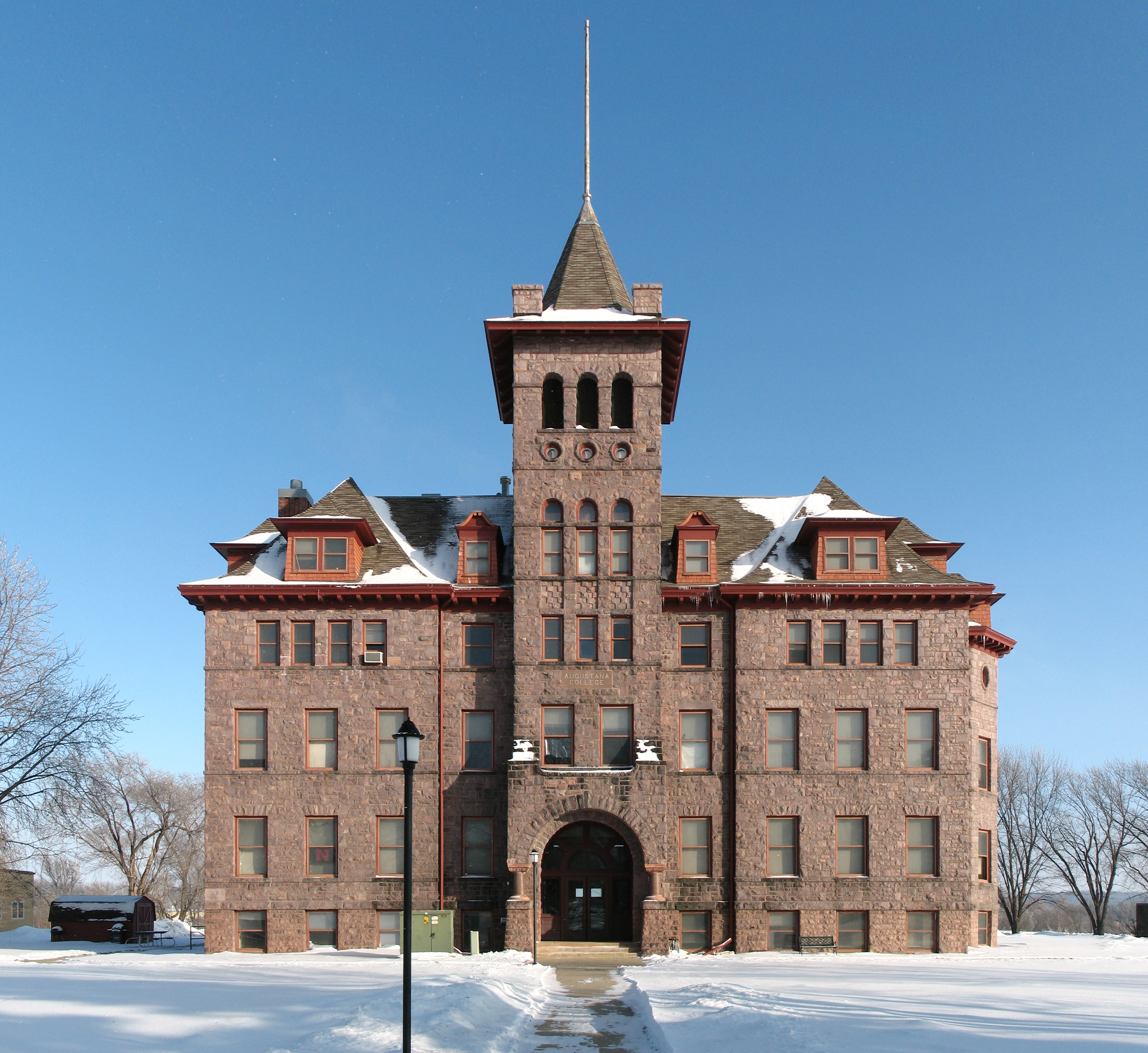
- Old Main on the Augustana Academy campus, December 2010

- Location within South Dakota
- Location: Lawler and 2nd Sts., Canton, South Dakota
- Coordinates: 43°18′13″N 96°34′41″W
- Architectural style: Romanesque
- NRHP reference No.: 85003093
- Added to NRHP: December 2, 1985

Augustana Academy was an educational institution in Canton, South Dakota.

The Norwegian Augustana Synod was established in 1870. In that year, the Synod began an academy called the Marshall Academy in Marshall, Wisconsin. In 1881, the academy was moved to Beloit, Iowa, and renamed to Augustana Seminary and Academy. In 1884 the institution, now simply called Augustana College, moved from Beloit to Canton, South Dakota. It included Augustana Academy for high school students.

In 1917 the Norwegian Synod, Hauge Synod and the United Norwegian Lutheran Church in America merged to become the Norwegian Lutheran Church of America. The new synod combined Augustana College with Lutheran Normal School in Sioux Falls, some 25 miles away. The Normal School was from the Norwegian Synod. Augustana Academy, no longer a division of the college, remained in Canton. Augustana Academy closed in 1971. Since Augustana Academy closed, its records are held by Augustana University in Sioux Falls.

== Notable alumni ==
- Carl Braaten, America theologian
- Ole Rølvaag, well known for his writings on the Norwegian American immigrant experience on the Great Plains. Among other writings, he was author of Giants in the Earth.
- Archie M. Gubbrud, 22nd Governor of South Dakota
- Mary Hart, longtime host of Entertainment Tonight

== Other sources ==
- Nelson, E. Clifford, and Fevold, Eugene L. The Lutheran Church among Norwegian-Americans: a history of the Evangelical Lutheran Church (Minneapolis: Augsburg Publishing House, 1960)
