= Morgan Ensberg =

American baseball player and coach (born 1975)

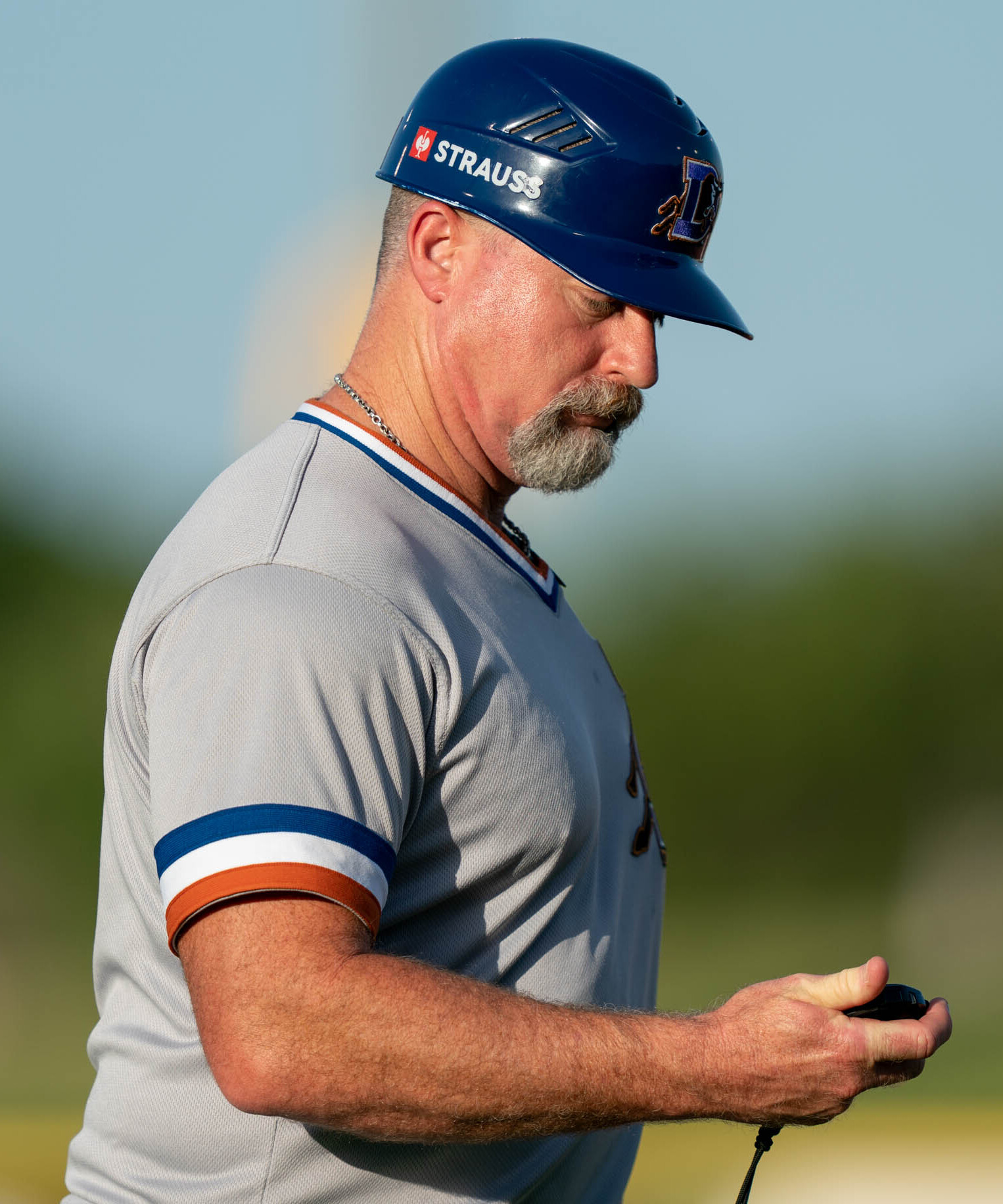
- Ensberg with the Durham Bulls in 2025
- Third baseman
- Born: August 26, 1975 (age 50); Hermosa Beach, California, U.S.
- Batted: Right Threw: Right

MLB debut
- September 20, 2000, for the Houston Astros

Last MLB appearance
- May 25, 2008, for the New York Yankees

MLB statistics
- Batting average: .263
- Home runs: 110
- Runs batted in: 347
- Stats at Baseball Reference

Teams
- Houston Astros (2000–2007); San Diego Padres (2007); New York Yankees (2008)

Career highlights and awards
- All-Star (2005); Silver Slugger Award (2005)

Morgan Paul Ensberg (born August 26, 1975) is an American former professional baseball infielder. He played in Major League Baseball (MLB) for the Houston Astros, San Diego Padres, and New York Yankees. Ensberg bats and throws right-handed. From 2011–12 he was the co-host of MLB Roundtrip on SiriusXM's MLB Network Radio. As of 2025, Ensberg is the manager of the Durham Bulls, the Triple-A affiliate of the Tampa Bay Rays.

== Early life ==
Ensberg was born in Hermosa Beach, California. He attended Riviera Hall Lutheran School during elementary and middle school. He was an All CIF Basketball and Baseball Player at Redondo Union High School (Redondo Beach, California). He was also named to the Daily Breeze All Area Team in both basketball and baseball his senior year.

== College career ==
Ensberg attended the University of Southern California and played third base. In 1997, he played collegiate summer baseball in the Cape Cod Baseball League for the Yarmouth-Dennis Red Sox. He was a 1998 All-American and Team MVP for USC's 1998 National Championship team. He is the only Trojan who has compiled 20 home runs and 20 stolen bases in a single season. He holds top 10 records in 10 offensive categories. While attending USC, he joined the Phi Delta Theta fraternity.

== Professional career ==
Ensberg was drafted in the ninth round of the 1998 Major League Baseball draft. In spring training of 2000, he and five of his teammates were in their hotel room when two gunmen burst into their room. Aaron Miles was in the next room and wrestled one of the gunmen to the ground before the other one fled, only to be caught later on. The other players involved were: Derrek Nicholson, Keith Ginter, Mike Rose, and Eric Cole.

Ensberg enjoyed a stellar 2005 season, batting .283 with 36 home runs and compiling a career high 101 RBI while helping lead the Astros to the World Series. He was named to the National League All-Star team at the last minute in 2005, replacing the injured Scott Rolen. He was also awarded the Silver Slugger Award for NL third basemen.

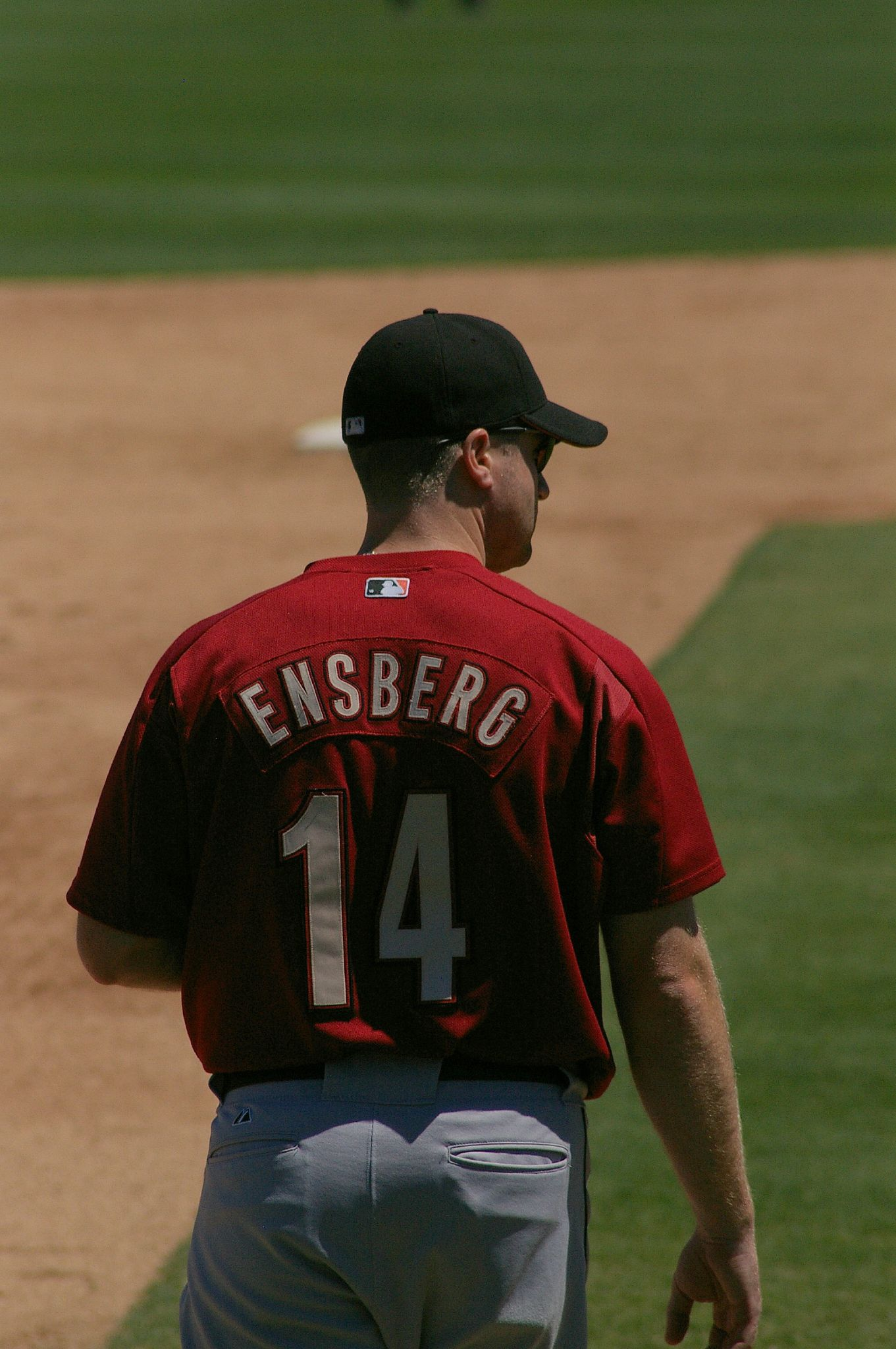
Ensberg with the Astros

Other than Barry Bonds, Ensberg was the only major league player to record at least 100 walks and have fewer hits than walks in 2006.

On July 31, 2007, the Astros traded Ensberg to the San Diego Padres. This was only days after the Astros traded pitcher Dan Wheeler to the Tampa Bay Rays for utility man Ty Wigginton. Houston paid the remainder of Ensberg's $4.35 million salary. He hit two home runs and a single in his Padres debut.

Ensberg was not offered a new contract by the Padres and became a free agent on December 12, 2007. On January 31, 2008, he signed a minor league contract with the New York Yankees with an invitation to spring training, anticipating to compete for the first base position. On March 22, he was added to the Yankees 40-man roster.

In 2008, Ensberg hit .203 with a home run and 4 runs batted in for the Yankees. The Yankees designated him for assignment on June 1, and released him on June 8. On June 17, he signed a minor league contract with the Cleveland Indians. He became a free agent at the end of the season.

On February 9, 2009, Ensberg signed a minor league deal with the Tampa Bay Rays and was invited to the major league camp. However, he was released at the end of spring training. After the 2009 season, he decided to retire from baseball. He started a public blog and announced his intent to transition into a broadcasting career.

Ensberg is the only MLB player in history to have won championship rings in college (USC '98), rookie league (Auburn '98), single A (Kissimmee '99), AA (Round Rock '00), AAA (New Orleans '01), and to have played in a World Series (2005, Houston Astros).

== Coaching career ==
=== UC San Diego ===
For the 2011 and 2012 baseball seasons, Ensberg was hired as a hitters and infielders coach for the UC San Diego Tritons.

=== Houston Astros ===
Beginning in the 2013 season, Ensberg rejoined the Houston Astros organization as a developmental specialist for the Single-A Lancaster JetHawks. The Astros announced his new role as a Minor League special assignment coach in 2014.

On January 9, 2017, Ensberg was named manager of the Tri-City ValleyCats, the Low-A affiliate of the Astros in the New York–Penn League.

On January 19, 2018, Ensberg became the manager of the Buies Creek Astros, the High-A affiliate of the Astros in the Carolina League. He was named 2018 Best Managerial Prospect in the Carolina League by Baseball America. The Buies Creek Astros won the 2018 Carolina League with a record of 80–57.

=== Tampa Bay Rays ===
On January 18, 2019, Ensberg became the manager for the Tampa Bay Rays' Double-A affiliate, the Montgomery Biscuits. He led the Biscuits to a club record 88-50. He was named 2019 Southern League Manager of the Year and was also awarded the 2019 Tampa Bay Rays Employee of the Year.

After the 2023 minor league season, Ensberg managed the Peoria Javelinas of the Arizona Fall League. The Javelinas reached the finals, but fell to the Surprise Saguaros, 5–4.

On January 23, 2024, Ensberg was announced as the manager of the Durham Bulls, the Triple-A affiliate of the Rays.

Ensberg was named manager of the Caribes de Anzoátegui prior to the start of the 2024–25 Venezuelan Professional Baseball League season. He lasted one season in the role, and was replaced by Asdrúbal Cabrera for the following season.

== See also ==
- Houston Astros award winners and league leaders
