= Arlington Masonic Temple =

- U.S. National Register of Historic Places
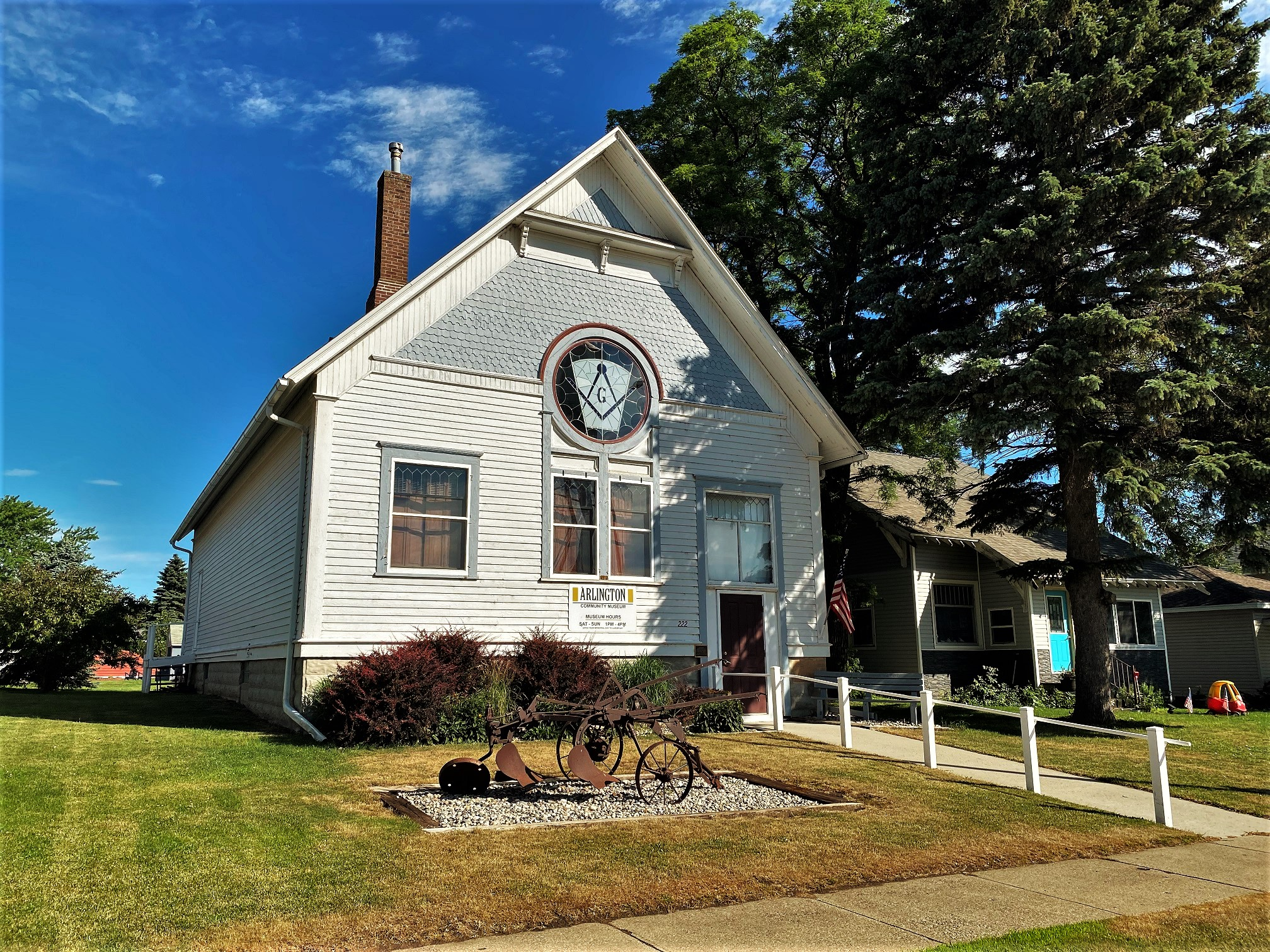
- The temple in 2020

- Location within South Dakota Location within the United States
- Location: 222 S. Main St. Arlington, South Dakota
- Coordinates: 44°21′47″N 97°08′06″W
- Built: 1907-08
- Built by: W.H. Eastman
- Architect: George Issenhuth
- NRHP reference No.: 100000690
- Added to NRHP: February 27, 2017

The Arlington Masonic Temple, on S. Main Street in Arlington, South Dakota, was listed on the National Register of Historic Places in 2017.

It was built in 1907–1908. It was designed by Huron, South Dakota architect George Issenhuth and built by contractor W.H. Eastman.

The building is used as the Arlington Community Museum.
