= Canton Carnegie Library =

- U.S. National Register of Historic Places
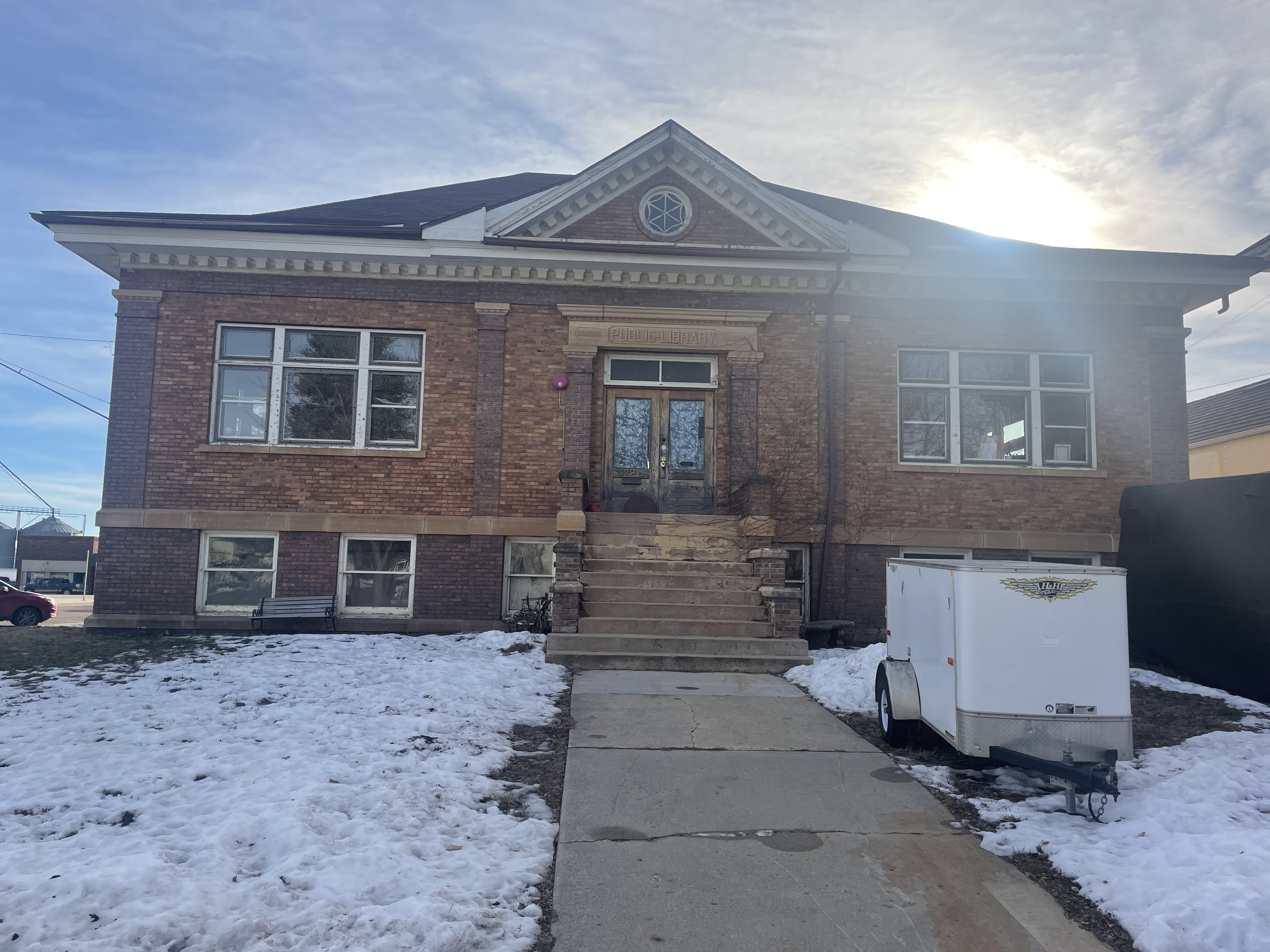
- The library, January 2026

- Location within South Dakota
- Location: 225 E. 4th St., Canton, South Dakota
- Coordinates: 43°18′06″N 96°35′28″W
- Area: less than one acre
- Built by: Satrum Brothers
- Architect: George Issenhuth
- NRHP reference No.: 16000826
- Added to NRHP: December 6, 2016

The Canton Carnegie Library, at 225 E. 4th St. in Canton, South Dakota, was built in 1913. It was listed on the National Register of Historic Places in 2016.

It is a raised one-story building with basement built of brick with sandstone trim, upon a concrete foundation.

It was designed by Huron, South Dakota architect George Issenhuth.
