= John H. Lawrence =

American physicist and physician (1904–1991)

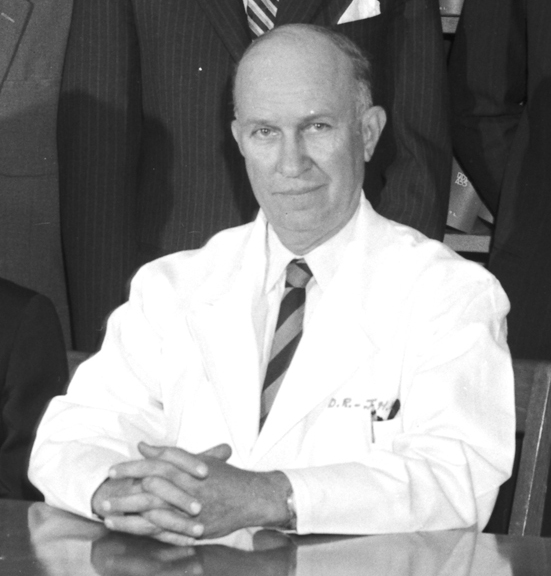
- Lawrence in 1960
- Born: January 7, 1904; Canton, South Dakota, United States
- Died: September 7, 1991 (aged 87); Berkeley, California, United States
- Education: University of South Dakota: Harvard University
- Known for: development of nuclear medicine
- Relatives: Ernest Lawrence (brother)
- Awards: Enrico Fermi Award (1983)
- Scientific career
- Fields: Nuclear medicine
- Workplaces: Harvard University; Donner Laboratory; University of California, Berkeley

John Hundale Lawrence (January 7, 1904 – September 7, 1991) was an American physicist and physician best known for pioneering the field of nuclear medicine.

== Background ==
John Hundale Lawrence was born in Canton, South Dakota. His parents, Carl Gustavus and Gunda Regina (née Jacobson) Lawrence, were both the offspring of Norwegian immigrants who had met while teaching at the high school in Canton, South Dakota, where his father was also the superintendent of schools. His brother was physicist Ernest O. Lawrence. He attended college at the University of South Dakota before getting his M.D. degree from Harvard Medical School. He was awarded a Guggenheim Fellowship in physics in 1957.

== Career ==
He had a long-term association with the University of California, Berkeley and worked at the Lawrence Berkeley National Laboratory. There he discovered treatments for leukemia and polycythemia by injecting infected mice with radioactive phosphorus derived from the cyclotron invented by his brother, the Nobel Laureate Ernest O. Lawrence. In 1936, he administered a dose of radiophosphorus to a 28-year-old leukemia patient, this being the first time that a radioactive isotope produced by the cyclotron being used to treat a human patient. Lawrence pioneered the usage of radioactive tracer techniques to study the impact of disease on metabolic processes. He also demonstrated that neutron beams were potentially more effective at battling cancerous cells than X-rays, and, in 1949, became the first physician to use a radioactively labelled noble gas for diagnostic purposes in humans.

Lawrence's work with cancer patients attracted the interest of William Donner, a Philadelphia industrialist and philanthropist, whose son had died of cancer. Donner contributed funds for construction of Donner Laboratory, at the Northeast corner of the Berkeley Campus that was dedicated in 1942. In June of the same year, he married Amy McNear Bowles, daughter of George McNear Bowles, Sr. and Beatrice (Nickel) Bowles of San Francisco.

John Lawrence received the Enrico Fermi Award in 1983. He received honorary degrees from the University of South Dakota, University of Bordeaux and from the Catholic University of America. He was awarded the Caldwell Medal of the American Roentgen Ray Society; the MacKenzie Davidson Medal of the British Institute of Radiology; a medal from Pope Pius XII; the Silver Medal of the University of Bordeaux; the Silver Cross of the Greek Royal Order of the Phoenix and the Pasteur Medal of the Pasteur Institute of Paris.

== Personal life ==
The experience of the Lawrence Brothers in nuclear medicine became crucial in saving their mother, when she was diagnosed with uterine cancer in 1937. When they were told at Mayo Clinic that she had three months left to live, John Lawrence brought her to be treated by radiologist Dr. Robert S. Stone, one of his collaborators. Stone successfully used high-energy X-rays obtained from an x-ray tube that had been invented by David Sloan, one of the first members of Ernest Lawrence's team at Berkeley. Gunda Lawrence lived about another 15 years after the treatment, until the age of 83.

Lawrence was a survivor of the sinking of the SS Athenia in 1939.

== Biography ==
- Radioisotopes and Radiation: Recent Advances in Medicine, Agriculture, and Industry (1969) ISBN 0-486-62301-7
- Recent Advances in Nuclear Medicine, Vol. 5 (1978) ISBN 0-8089-1068-X
