= Ellendale Opera House Block =

- U.S. National Register of Historic Places
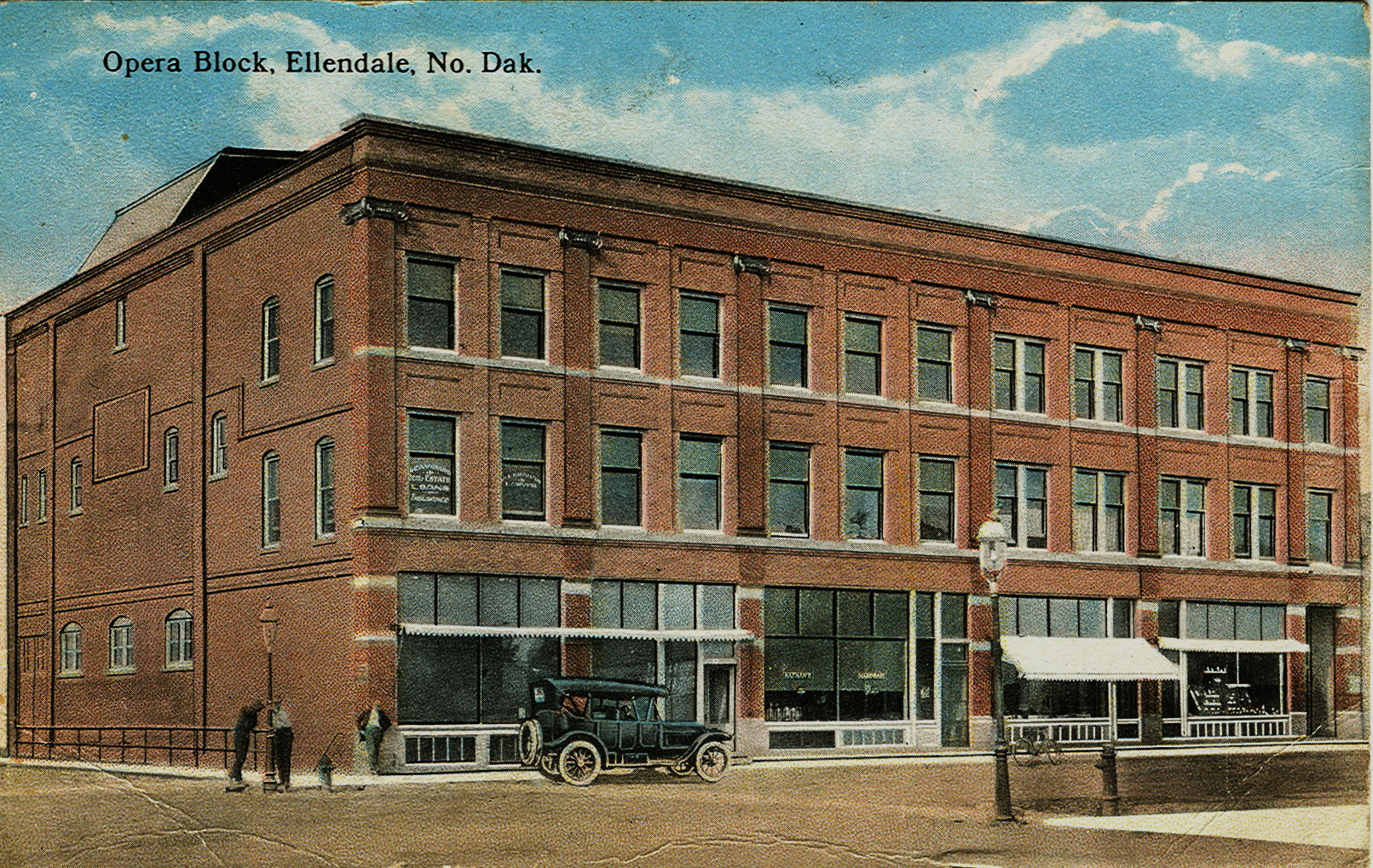

- Location within North Dakota Location within the United States
- Location: 105-111 Main St., Ellendale, North Dakota
- Coordinates: 46°0′6″N 98°31′42″W
- Area: less than one acre
- Built: 1908
- Architect: Issenhuth, George
- Architectural style: Chicago
- NRHP reference No.: 92000354
- Added to NRHP: April 22, 1992

The Ellendale Opera House Block is located on Main St. in Ellendale, North Dakota

The three-story brick structure was built in 1908 and had its grand opening in 1909. It was designed by George Issenhuth with some elements of Chicago School architecture. The main part of the auditorium floor was for seating where plays and shows were held. The second story had offices.

It is significant architecturally with its community, whose older architecture has been diminished by fires. It was listed on the National Register of Historic Places in 1992.
