= George Issenhuth =

American architect

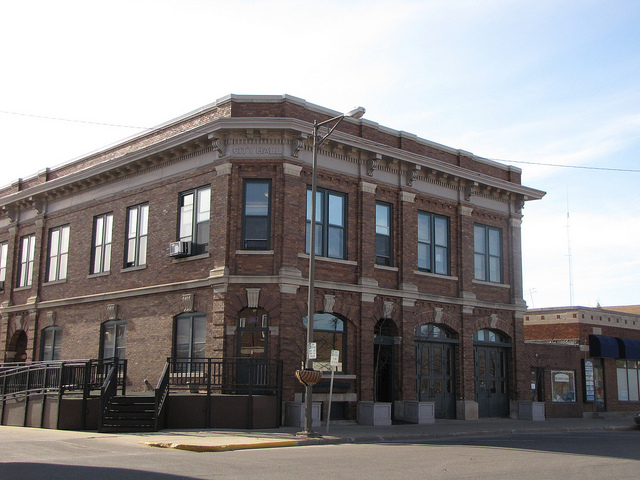
The former City Hall of Brookings, South Dakota, designed by Issenhuth and built in 1912.

George Issenhuth (1862–1941) was an American architect based in South Dakota. He designed several buildings which have been listed on the National Register of Historic Places (NRHP).

He practiced as an architect in Huron, South Dakota actively from about 1906 to 1933, designing at least 58 schools in South Dakota and many churches, houses, and commercial buildings including banks. He designed the Brookings City Hall and state fairgrounds buildings.

Works include:

- Arlington Masonic Temple (1907–08), S. Main Street, Arlington, South Dakota, NRHP-listed
- Ellendale Opera House Block (1908), 105-111 Main St., Ellendale, North Dakota, NRHP-listed
- Brookings City Hall (1912), 4th St. Brookings, South Dakota, NRHP-listed
- Canton Carnegie Library (1913), Canton, South Dakota, NRHP-listed
- Dairy Building (1913), off Third St. near the South Dakota State Fair Grounds, Huron, South Dakota, NRHP-listed
