= Peder and Helga Tuntland Farmstead =

Historic place in South Dakota

- Tuntland, Peder and Helga, Farmstead
- U.S. National Register of Historic Places
- Location within South Dakota Location within the United States
- Nearest city: Beresford, South Dakota
- Coordinates: 43°09′50″N 96°39′48″W
- Area: less than one acre
- Built: 1890
- Architectural style: Folk Victorian
- NRHP reference No.: 94000194
- Added to NRHP: March 17, 1994

The Peder and Helga Tuntland Farmstead, in Lincoln County, South Dakota roughly 10 miles northwest of Beresford, was listed on the National Register of Historic Places in 1994. It included three contributing buildings: a house, its outhouse, and a barn.

It was deemed significant in 1994 as "a good example of a South Dakota farm passed down through one family. The buildings reveal the ever change methods and modernization of agricultural technology as well as providing a good example of typical period house and outbuilding styles. The Tuntland Farm is historically significant for its long association with agricultural development in rural South Dakota. This collection of buildings also typifies a well preserved example of building styles on the ever evolving farmstead. Occupied and fanned by the same family since 1890 the house and barn retain a high degree of historic integrity."
