= Beloit, Iowa =

- Unincorporated community
- Location within Iowa Location within the United States
- Coordinates: 43°16′53″N 96°34′30″W
- Country: United States
- State: Iowa
- County: Lyon
- Township: Lyon
- Elevation: 1,243 ft (379 m)
- Time zone: UTC-6 (Central (CST))
  - Summer (DST): UTC-5 (CDT)
- Area code: 712
- GNIS feature ID: 454505

Beloit is an unincorporated community in Lyon Township, Lyon County, Iowa, United States.

== Geography ==
Beloit is located on the banks of the Big Sioux River in northwestern Iowa just across the river from Canton, South Dakota. U.S. Route 18 is just one mile to the north in Canton.

== History ==
Originally served by the Chicago, Milwaukee, St. Paul and Pacific Railroad from 1881 until 1980, Beloit is currently served by the D&I Railroad. Beloit was home to Augustana College in 1881, but was then moved into Canton in 1888.

Beloit's population was 52 in 1925. The population was 191 in 1940.
