= Canton Lutheran Church =

Historic church in South Dakota, United States

- U.S. National Register of Historic Places
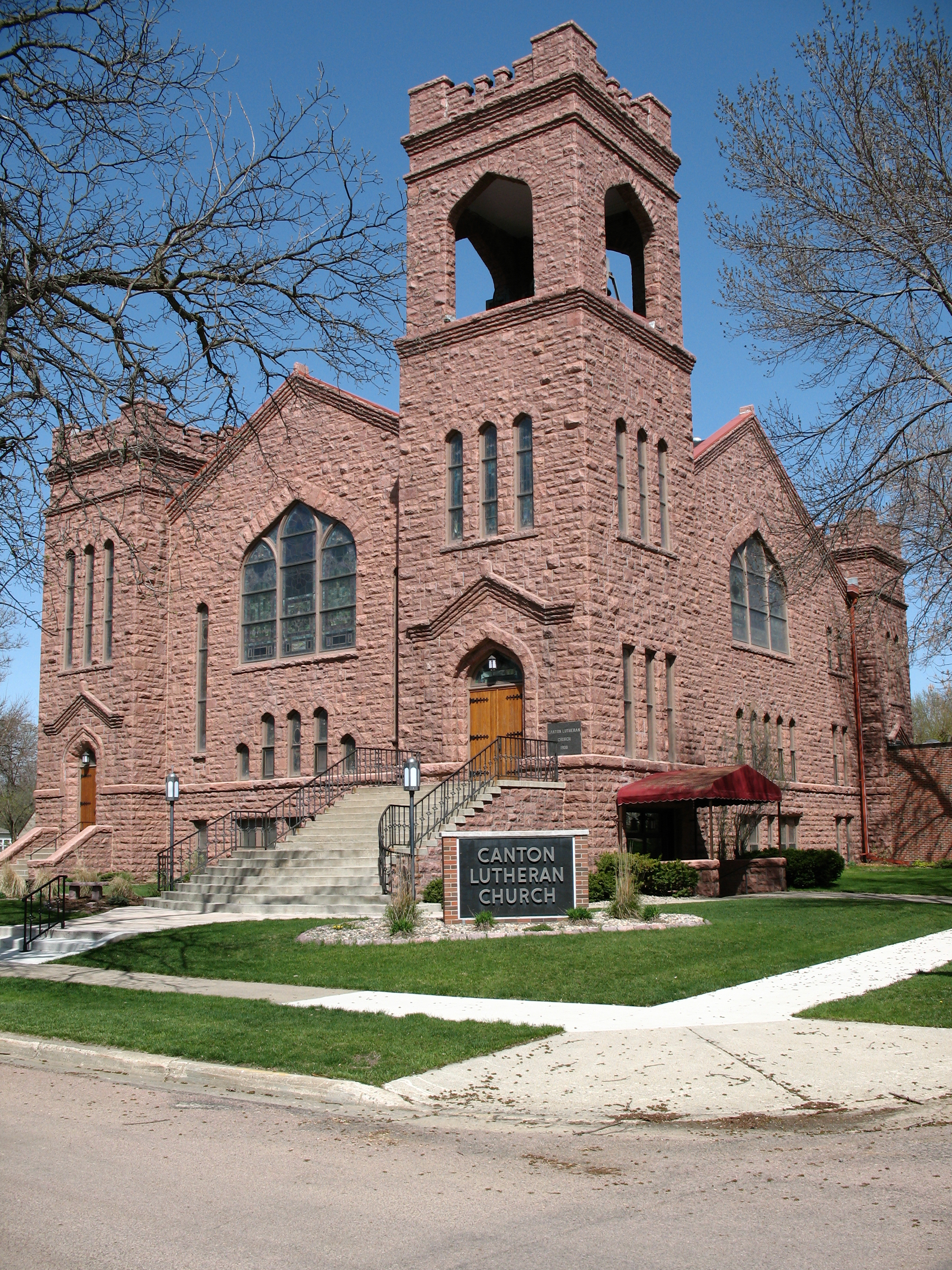

- Location within South Dakota Location within the United States
- Location: 124 E. Second St., Canton, South Dakota
- Coordinates: 43°18′14″N 96°35′30″W
- Area: less than one acre
- Built: 1908
- Architect: Millie, John
- Architectural style: Gothic Revival
- NRHP reference No.: 02000582
- Added to NRHP: May 30, 2002

Canton Lutheran Church is a historic church at 124 E. Second Street in Canton, South Dakota. It was built in 1908 and was added to the National Register in 2002.

The Canton Lutheran congregation worship services were first held in 1868 in homes of Norwegian immigrant homesteaders. A second Norwegian Lutheran congregation was later established in Canton. In 1902, the two congregations merged and joined their two wooden churches together to form one large auditorium. The present church was erected In 1908–09. The office-library-chapel-Sunday school addition was built in 1962.
