= Canton, South Dakota =

- City
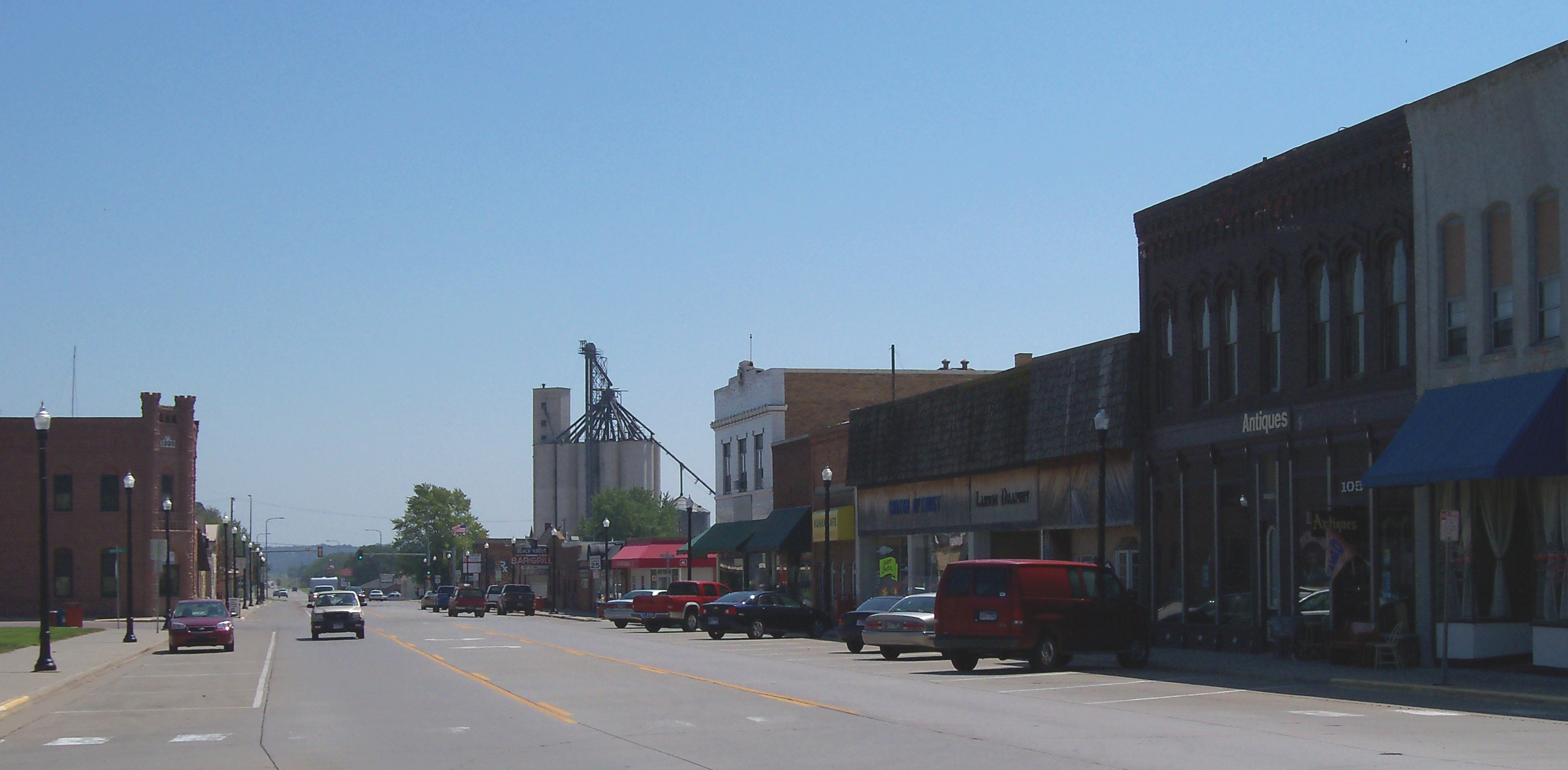
- Downtown Canton, South Dakota
- Motto: "Can Live. Can Dream. Can Do!"
- Location in Lincoln County and the state of South Dakota
- Coordinates: 43°18′14″N 96°36′16″W
- Country: United States
- State: South Dakota
- County: Lincoln
- Incorporated: 1881

Government
  - Type: Council-Manager

Area
  - Total: 3.29 sq mi (8.51 km^{2})
  - Land: 3.27 sq mi (8.47 km^{2})
  - Water: 0.015 sq mi (0.04 km^{2})
- Elevation: 1,286 ft (392 m)

Population (2020)
  - Total: 3,066
  - Density: 937.7/sq mi (362.05/km^{2})
- Time zone: UTC−6 (Central (CST))
  - Summer (DST): UTC−5 (CDT)
- ZIP code: 57013
- Area code: 605
- FIPS code: 46-09500
- GNIS feature ID: 1267310
- Website: City website

Canton is a city in South Dakota and the county seat of Lincoln County, South Dakota, United States. Canton is located 18 miles south of Sioux Falls in southeastern South Dakota. The city was named by Norwegian settler and former legislator James M. Wahl. The population was 3,066 as of the 2020 census.

The City of Canton was the recipient of the South Dakota Community of the Year Award in 2004 and in 2011. The city is also home to the Canton Industrial Park, which became the first South Dakota Certified Ready Site in July of 2012.

== History ==
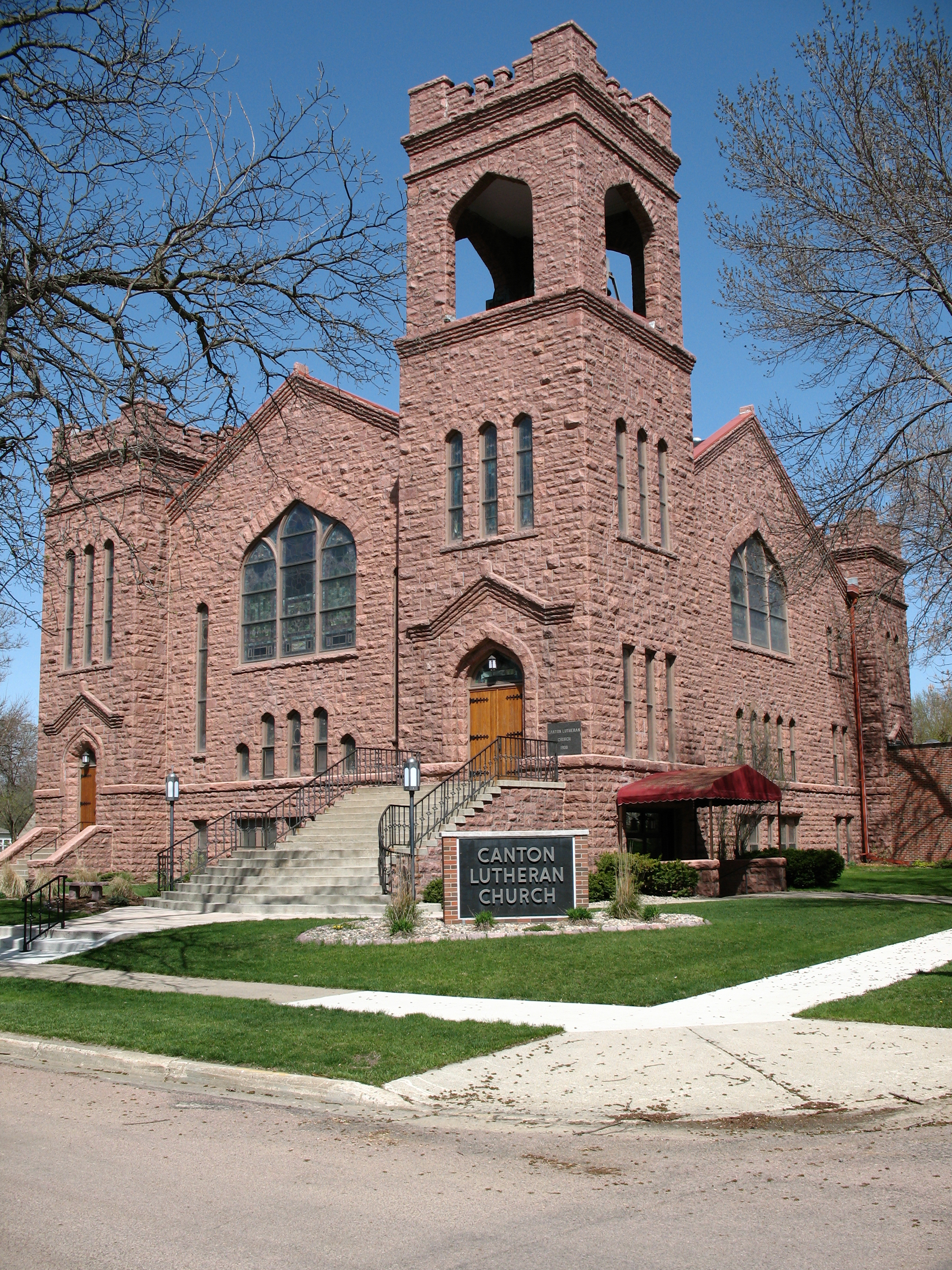
Canton Lutheran Church

The earliest known visitor to the area was Lewis P. Hyde, who first came to the area in 1866. The first actual settler was August Linderman. By 1868, there were 35 people living in Lincoln County. The residents named the community Canton, believing the location to be the exact opposite of Canton, China. By the summer of that year, a caravan of 180 Norwegian settlers crossed the Big Sioux River to make their home in Canton. In 1880, the Chicago, Milwaukee, St. Paul and Pacific Railroad crossed the Big Sioux River to reach Canton. The city still has an active rail freight service. The city has many historical homes and buildings dating back to the late 1800s. Some notable sites include The Kennedy Mansion on Dakota Street, as well as the Historical Society House built in 1886. Lincoln County Courthouse was built in 1889, and Canton Lutheran Church was built in 1908.

== Government ==
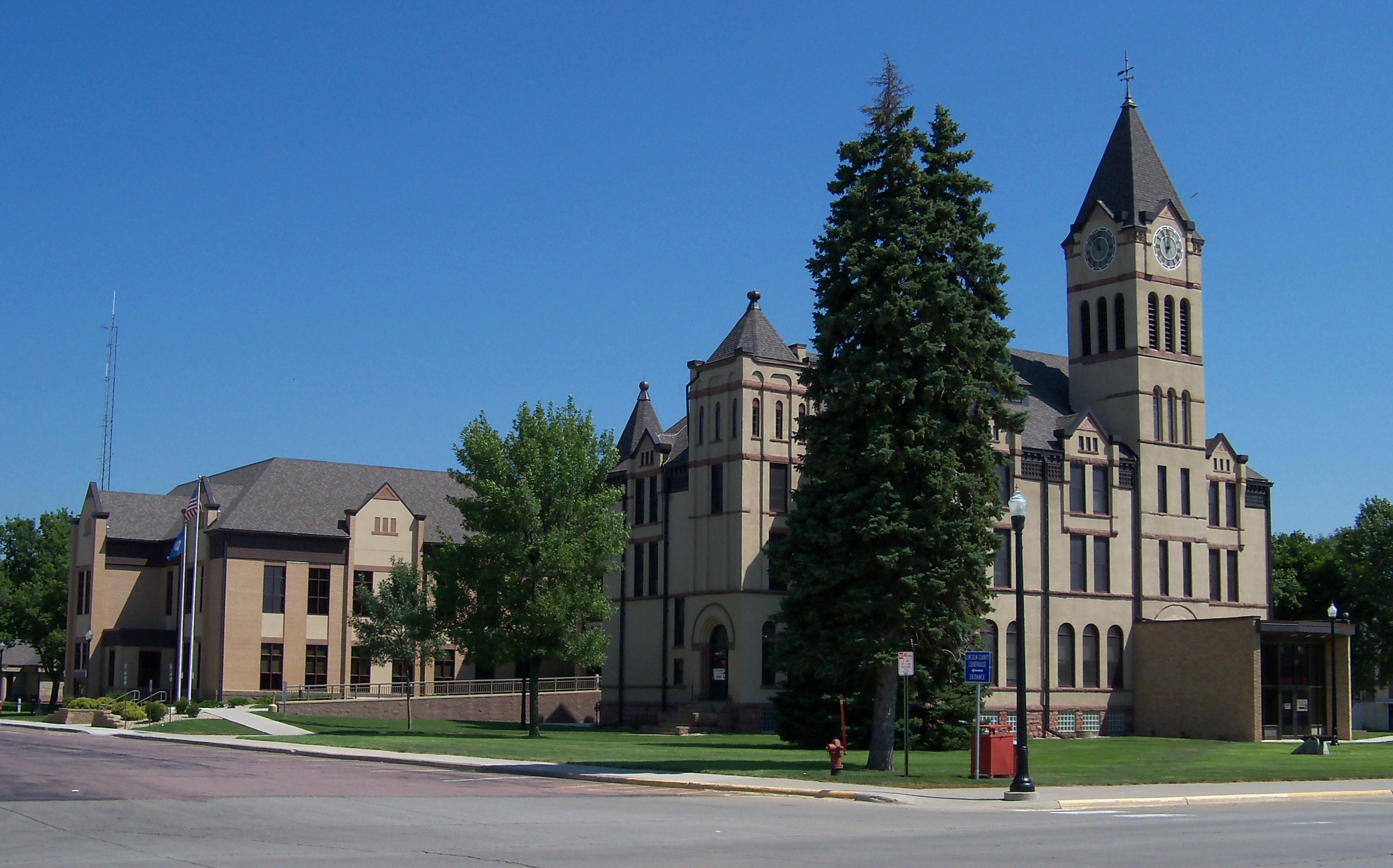
Lincoln County Courthouse.

The City of Canton operates under the council-manager form of government. Canton's governing body is made up of nine members. The Mayor is selected from and appointed by members of the City Commission. The Library Board oversees the operations of the Canton Public Library and appoints a Library Director. All services and programs provided by the library are overseen by the board. The Planning Commission is charged with overseeing the long-range planning of the community, including zoning issues, subdivisions and formulation of the Comprehensive Plan. The Planning Commission serves a vital role in recommending major policy changes to the governing body for the development of the community.

The city of Canton is also the county seat for Lincoln County.

== Geography ==
Canton is located along the Big Sioux River across from Beloit, Iowa.

According to the United States Census Bureau, the city has a total area of 3.22 square miles (8.34 km^{2}), of which 3.19 square miles (8.26 km^{2}) is land and 0.03 square miles (0.08 km^{2}) is water. Canton has been assigned the ZIP code 57013 and the FIPS place code 09500.

=== Climate ===
Canton experiences a humid continental climate (Köppen Dfa), which is characterized by hot, relatively humid summers and cold, dry winters, and is located in USDA Plant Hardiness Zone 4b. The monthly daily average temperature ranges from 15.5 °F (−9.2 °C) in January to 72.5 °F (22.5 °C) in July, while there are 15 days of 90 °F (32 °C)+ highs and 25 days with sub-0 °F (−18 °C) lows annually. Snowfall occurs mostly in light to moderate amounts during the winter, totaling 36.1 inches (92 cm). Precipitation, at 27.81 inches (706 mm) annually, is concentrated in the warmer months. Extremes range from −47 °F (−44 °C) on February 2, 1905, to 115 °F (46 °C) on July 17, 1936.

Climate data for Canton, South Dakota (1991−2020 normals, extremes 1896−present)
| Month | Jan | Feb | Mar | Apr | May | Jun | Jul | Aug | Sep | Oct | Nov | Dec | Year |
|---|---|---|---|---|---|---|---|---|---|---|---|---|---|
| Record high °F (°C) | 68 (20) | 70 (21) | 90 (32) | 97 (36) | 109 (43) | 106 (41) | 115 (46) | 112 (44) | 104 (40) | 95 (35) | 82 (28) | 65 (18) | 115 (46) |
| Mean maximum °F (°C) | 46.2 (7.9) | 52.9 (11.6) | 70.5 (21.4) | 82.7 (28.2) | 89.2 (31.8) | 94.3 (34.6) | 93.5 (34.2) | 92.2 (33.4) | 88.6 (31.4) | 82.8 (28.2) | 66.6 (19.2) | 49.1 (9.5) | 96.5 (35.8) |
| Mean daily maximum °F (°C) | 25.3 (−3.7) | 30.6 (−0.8) | 43.7 (6.5) | 57.8 (14.3) | 69.8 (21.0) | 79.8 (26.6) | 83.3 (28.5) | 80.2 (26.8) | 73.6 (23.1) | 60.0 (15.6) | 43.5 (6.4) | 29.4 (−1.4) | 56.4 (13.6) |
| Daily mean °F (°C) | 15.5 (−9.2) | 20.5 (−6.4) | 32.8 (0.4) | 46.1 (7.8) | 58.3 (14.6) | 69.0 (20.6) | 72.5 (22.5) | 69.6 (20.9) | 62.0 (16.7) | 48.2 (9.0) | 33.3 (0.7) | 20.3 (−6.5) | 45.7 (7.6) |
| Mean daily minimum °F (°C) | 5.8 (−14.6) | 10.5 (−11.9) | 22.0 (−5.6) | 34.3 (1.3) | 46.7 (8.2) | 58.2 (14.6) | 61.8 (16.6) | 59.0 (15.0) | 50.3 (10.2) | 36.4 (2.4) | 23.0 (−5.0) | 11.3 (−11.5) | 34.9 (1.6) |
| Mean minimum °F (°C) | −18.4 (−28.0) | −10.6 (−23.7) | −1.7 (−18.7) | 18.1 (−7.7) | 32.9 (0.5) | 46.2 (7.9) | 50.1 (10.1) | 47.9 (8.8) | 33.7 (0.9) | 19.8 (−6.8) | 4.4 (−15.3) | −10.8 (−23.8) | −21.3 (−29.6) |
| Record low °F (°C) | −38 (−39) | −47 (−44) | −23 (−31) | −6 (−21) | 17 (−8) | 25 (−4) | 34 (1) | 32 (0) | 15 (−9) | −10 (−23) | −22 (−30) | −42 (−41) | −47 (−44) |
| Average precipitation inches (mm) | 0.56 (14) | 0.75 (19) | 1.31 (33) | 2.88 (73) | 4.08 (104) | 4.66 (118) | 3.55 (90) | 2.99 (76) | 2.90 (74) | 2.21 (56) | 1.15 (29) | 0.77 (20) | 27.81 (706) |
| Average snowfall inches (cm) | 7.0 (18) | 8.5 (22) | 4.7 (12) | 2.8 (7.1) | 0.1 (0.25) | 0.0 (0.0) | 0.0 (0.0) | 0.0 (0.0) | 0.0 (0.0) | 0.8 (2.0) | 4.8 (12) | 7.4 (19) | 36.1 (92) |
| Average precipitation days (≥ 0.01 in) | 5.3 | 5.3 | 5.9 | 8.8 | 12.4 | 10.5 | 8.5 | 8.8 | 7.8 | 7.7 | 5.2 | 5.4 | 91.6 |
| Average snowy days (≥ 0.1 in) | 4.4 | 4.2 | 2.7 | 1.3 | 0.1 | 0.0 | 0.0 | 0.0 | 0.0 | 0.6 | 2.0 | 4.5 | 19.8 |
Source: NOAA

=== Metropolitan area ===
Canton is part of the Sioux Falls Metropolitan Statistical Area that consists of four counties, all of which are located in South Dakota: Lincoln, McCook, Minnehaha, and Turner. The estimated population of this MSA in 2008 was 232,930, an increase of over 24% from the 2000 census. According to recent estimates, Lincoln County, which Canton is the County Seat, is the ninth fastest-growing county (by percentage) in the United States. In addition to Canton, several cities and towns included in the metropolitan area are Sioux Falls, Brandon, Dell Rapids, Tea, Harrisburg, Worthing, Beresford, Lennox, Hartford, Crooks, Baltic, Montrose, Salem, Renner, Chancellor, Colton, Humboldt, Parker, Hurley, Garretson, Sherman, Corson, and Centerville.

=== Parks and recreation ===
Newton Hills State Park, located six miles south of Canton, offers camping and picnicking, as well as horseback riding, nature trails and cross country skiing throughout the park. Canton hosts many recreation festivals and events. The summer starts with the Optimist Youth Days Carnival in June. An annual Car Show is held each year in the end of July along with other weekend festivities held in the park. The Big Sioux River Folk Festival in August attracts approximately 5,000 each year. The summer ends with the 4-H Achievement Days held on the 4-H grounds behind the hospital. The winter event hosted by the Canton Chamber of Commerce is the annual Christmas Parade and Visit with Santa in December. Canton also has a 9-hole golf course with a club house, a community pool, and seven area parks. Canton has many active community organizations that include: Masons, Greig Male Chorus, Lions Club, Rotary Club, Booster Club, Red Hat Society, PEO Sisterhood, Questers, Chamber of Commerce, Economic Development Corporation, Ministerial Association, Sons of Norway, Optimists Club, Love, INC., Historical Society, Grand Valley Rural School Historical Society, Junior Cheerleading, Boy and Girl Scouts, Boys and Girls Youth Softball, Youth Football and Baseball, Youth and Adult Bowling Leagues, 4-H Club, Retired Seniors Volunteer Program (RSVP), Garden Club, Meals on Wheels, Gun Club, Ducks Unlimited and an active VFW.

== Demographics ==
Historical population
| Census | Pop. | Note | %± |
|---|---|---|---|
| 1880 | 675 | | — |
| 1890 | 1,101 | | 63.1% |
| 1900 | 1,943 | | 76.5% |
| 1910 | 2,103 | | 8.2% |
| 1920 | 2,225 | | 5.8% |
| 1930 | 2,270 | | 2.0% |
| 1940 | 2,518 | | 10.9% |
| 1950 | 2,530 | | 0.5% |
| 1960 | 2,511 | | −0.8% |
| 1970 | 2,665 | | 6.1% |
| 1980 | 2,886 | | 8.3% |
| 1990 | 2,787 | | −3.4% |
| 2000 | 3,110 | | 11.6% |
| 2010 | 3,057 | | −1.7% |
| 2020 | 3,066 | | 0.3% |
U.S. Decennial Census; 2017 Estimate

=== 2020 census ===
As of the 2020 census, Canton had a population of 3,066. The median age was 38.7 years, with 25.6% of residents under the age of 18 and 18.8% aged 65 years or older. For every 100 females there were 98.6 males, and for every 100 females age 18 and over there were 94.8 males age 18 and over.

The 2020 Decennial Census Demographic and Housing Characteristics (DHC) reports that 0.0% of residents lived in urban areas, while 100.0% lived in rural areas.

There were 1,246 households in Canton, of which 31.4% had children under the age of 18 living in them. Of all households, 49.2% were married-couple households, 19.8% were households with a male householder and no spouse or partner present, and 24.5% were households with a female householder and no spouse or partner present. About 32.9% of all households were made up of individuals and 16.5% had someone living alone who was 65 years of age or older.

There were 1,375 housing units, of which 9.4% were vacant. The homeowner vacancy rate was 3.2% and the rental vacancy rate was 12.1%.

Racial composition as of the 2020 census
| Race | Number | Percent |
|---|---|---|
| White | 2,873 | 93.7% |
| Black or African American | 26 | 0.8% |
| American Indian and Alaska Native | 33 | 1.1% |
| Asian | 23 | 0.8% |
| Native Hawaiian and Other Pacific Islander | 0 | 0.0% |
| Some other race | 12 | 0.4% |
| Two or more races | 99 | 3.2% |
| Hispanic or Latino (of any race) | 40 | 1.3% |

=== 2010 census ===
As of the census of 2010, there were 3,057 people, 1,248 households, and 789 families residing in the city. The population density was 958.3 inhabitants per square mile (370.0/km^{2}). There were 1,351 housing units at an average density of 423.5 per square mile (163.5/km^{2}). The racial makeup of the city was 95.8% White, 0.3% African American, 1.3% Native American, 0.8% Asian, 0.2% from other races, and 1.6% from two or more races. Hispanic or Latino of any race were 1.7% of the population.

There were 1,248 households, of which 31.9% had children under the age of 18 living with them, 50.2% were married couples living together, 9.9% had a female householder with no husband present, 3.1% had a male householder with no wife present, and 36.8% were non-families. 32.3% of all households were made up of individuals, and 14.9% had someone living alone who was 65 years of age or older. The average household size was 2.37 and the average family size was 3.01.

The median age in the city was 38.6 years. 26.2% of residents were under the age of 18; 7.9% were between the ages of 18 and 24; 24% were from 25 to 44; 25.2% were from 45 to 64; and 16.8% were 65 years of age or older. The gender makeup of the city was 48.5% male and 51.5% female.

== Augustana College ==
In 1884, Augustana College moved from Beloit, Iowa, to Canton. An elementary through high school was also built as part of Augustana's relocation, and educated the internationally known physicist Merle Tuve, and brothers John Lawrence and Ernest Lawrence.

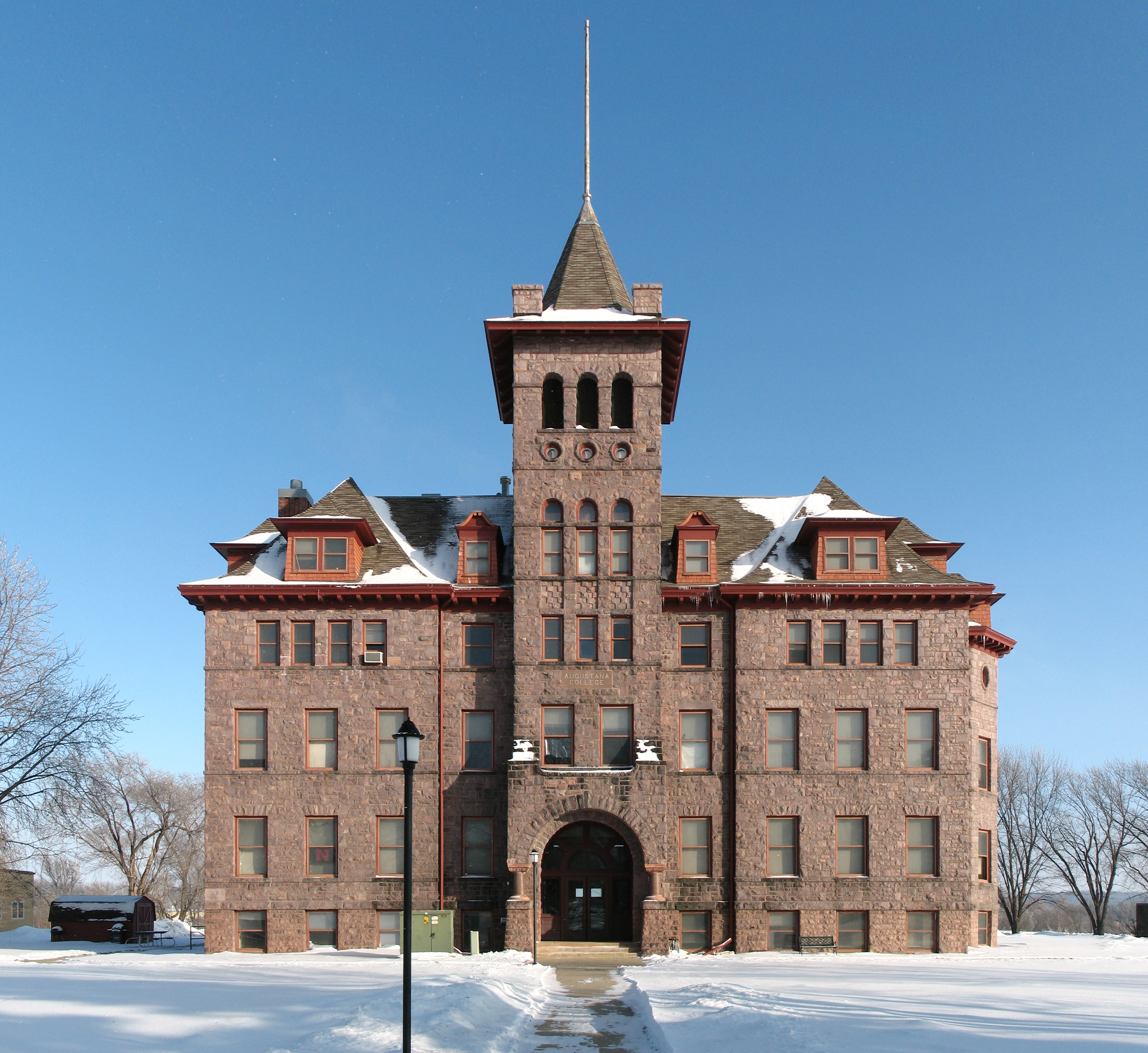
Old Main

Augustana struggled in Canton until Anthony G. Tuve became president in 1890. Attendance doubled, but a series of crop failures soon followed. As a result, in 1894, the Church Synod withheld appropriations. President Tuve assumed all financial obligations in order to keep the school open. After the crisis, Augustana prospered and soon outgrew its building. The building was moved in 1901. Then, in 1902, the college added to the campus on the east side of town. A four and ½ story brick building was erected to house classrooms, a gymnasium, and chapel. The new structure was dedicated in 1903. The college continued to grow. Enrollment increased to 330 by 1918. The school became widely known for its excellence in academics and for the many scholars who came for speaking engagements.

The United Norwegian Lutheran Synod had its headquarters on campus. An event in 1917 took place that changed the college and community. That year, the Norwegian Lutheran Synods merged to become the Norwegian Lutheran Church of America. The new synod considered it inadvisable to maintain Augustana College and Lutheran Normal School in Sioux Falls, barely 25 miles apart. A vigorous campaign to keep the college in Canton began. But, the advantages of locating the school in a larger community prevailed, and Canton lost their college. The bitterness was great, and was intensified when President Tuve died suddenly. The area pastors in the South Dakota district realized something needed to be done. An agreement was proposed and accepted that Canton would put up an endowment of $200,000 and turn it over to Augustana College. Then, the Normal School division would move to Canton. A fund drive was successful and the Canton Lutheran Normal School opened in the fall of 1920. The gradual transfer of the academy division to the Canton campus was made between 1920 and 1932. The school was known as Augustana Academy in 1932 and was no longer a division of the college. Capital improvements were made to the campus through the next several years including a new gymnasium and dormitory.

The history of Augustana Academy came to an end in 1971. The campus was closed and was sold to Keystone Treatment Center. The “Old Main” building has been converted into apartments.

== National Ski Tournament Site and Sioux Valley Ski Club ==
A young man named Ludwig Hoiby, a student at Augustana and originally from Norway, gave a skiing exhibition to a group of Canton students in 1911. This exhibition began the quest to clear the hill at the Thorson farm located on the Iowa side of the Sioux River east of Canton. In 1923 the first meet sponsored by the Sioux Valley Ski Club was held at a new location several hundred yards east of the original hill. A 250-foot scaffold and an improved takeoff were built and the Central U.S. Tournament was held the following year. On February 11 and 12, 1925, the National Tournament was held and Canton was host to over 10,000 fans. World-renowned singer, Eric Bye, presented the awards to the winners of several divisions. The winner of the "A" Division was awarded The Sioux Valley loving cup, a silver traveling trophy. Many notables were present that day including a member of the Olympic team, former national champions, and the international winner and the winner of the world distance title. Tournaments were held annually at the site and in 1930 the Club hosted the U.S. National Tournament a second time. In 1932 the U.S. Olympic Ski Jumping trials were held at the hill with Casper Oimoen winning the "A" Division. Three of the four qualifiers to the Olympics were members of the Sioux Valley Ski Club. Later that winter Oimoen would place 4th in the Olympics at Lake Placid, NY behind three Norwegian skiers. Snow was scarce in 1933 so it was trucked in 90 miles from Spirit Lake and Lake Okoboji, Iowa. By the time the snow was in place, it had turned into slush. Winds changed and brought bitter temperatures causing the slush to turn to ice so the tournament had to be cancelled. The largest crowd on record at the hill was in 1935 when the club hosted its third and final National Tournament. 15,000–20,000 people attended and out of town spectators stayed in Canton or Sioux Falls, SD hotels and in Pullman cars brought in by the railroad. The Sioux Valley Ski Club hosted its final Central U.S. Tournament in 1936. Poor attendance in 1936, cost increases and uncooperative weather prompted the club to fold the following year. Wind blew down the scaffolding in the 1940s, and in the 1960s the hill was used as a motorcycle climb. Today the site can be seen south of a South Dakota historic marker on U.S. Highway 18 two miles east of Canton.

== Hiawatha Insane Asylum ==
The first and only institution for insane Indians in the United States was Hiawatha Asylum for Insane Indians. It was placed in Canton because of the central location among the Western states with a large Indian populations and because of the influence of South Dakota's Representative Oscar S. Gifford and Senator Richard F. Pettigrew. In 1898, Congress passed a bill creating the institution. The bill establishing the Hiawatha Asylum for Insane Indians passed in 1899, and the Indian Appropriation Act for 1900 set aside $3,000 for land purchase and $42,000 for building construction. One hundred acres were purchased a mile east of Canton on the hills overlooking the Sioux River. The asylum was closed in 1934.

The asylum grounds and buildings were used for a short time by South Dakota as a penitentiary for first time offenders. In 1946, in what Cantonites refer to as the "second Manhattan Purchase," the city purchased for $1.00 the 337 acres and buildings of the old institution. The only stipulation of the purchases was that it be used for the welfare of the community. For a time, the asylum hospital was used for the Canton-Inwood Hospital, but today the old asylum buildings are gone. The land is now home to Sanford Hospital Canton-Inwood, Three Rivers Gun Club, the 4-H fairground and Hiawatha Country Club and Golf Course.

Today, a cemetery for 121 patients of the asylum is located on the original grounds of the asylum. The National Park Service added the cemetery to the National Register of Historic Places in 1998.

== Notable people ==
- Mike Broderick, former member of the South Dakota State Senate
- Oscar S. Gifford, former mayor of Canton
- Tim Johnson (D-S.D.), former U.S. senator
- Ernest Lawrence, Nobel laureate who invented the Cyclotron
- John Lawrence, pioneer in the field of nuclear medicine
- Theda Marshall, All-American Girls Professional Baseball League player
- Ole Edvart Rølvaag, graduate of Augustana Academy; author of Giants in the Earth
- Merle Tuve, geophysicist
- Rosemond Tuve, literary scholar
- James M. Wahl, South Dakota legislator

== See also ==
- Augustana Academy
- Augustana College
