= National Register of Historic Places listings in Woodbury County, Iowa =

Location of Woodbury County in Iowa

This is a list of the National Register of Historic Places listings in Woodbury County, Iowa.

This is intended to be a complete list of the properties and districts on the National Register of Historic Places in Woodbury County, Iowa, United States. Latitude and longitude coordinates are provided for many National Register properties and districts; these locations may be seen together in a map.

There are 63 properties and districts listed on the National Register in the county, including three National Historic Landmarks. An additional four properties were once listed, but have since been removed.

This National Park Service list is complete through NPS recent listings posted October 9, 2026.

	Name on the Register	Image	Date listed	Location	City or town	Description
1	Albertson and Company-Rocklin Manufacturing Company	Albertson and Company-Rocklin Manufacturing Company	May 9, 2019 (#100003944)	110 S. Jennings St. 42°29′25″N 96°23′57″W	Sioux City	
2	Alhambra Apartments	Alhambra Apartments	October 12, 2001 (#01001089)	801 8th St. 42°29′56″N 96°24′01″W	Sioux City	
3	Atchison A. Ashby House	Atchison A. Ashby House	September 25, 1998 (#98001207)	1807 Summit St. 42°30′34″N 96°24′36″W	Sioux City	
4	Badgerow Building	Badgerow Building	March 24, 1982 (#82002646)	622 4th St. 42°29′38″N 96°24′08″W	Sioux City	
5	George A. and Mary Tinkel Bailey House	George A. and Mary Tinkel Bailey House	August 5, 1998 (#98000929)	423 10th St. 42°28′53″N 95°47′03″W	Correctionville	
6	W.L. and Winnie (Woodfield) Belfrage Farmstead Historic District		November 16, 2017 (#100001819)	2410 Port Neal Rd. 42°21′32″N 96°21′01″W	Sergeant Bluff	
7	Benson Archeological Site (13WD50)		April 24, 1984 (#84001611)	Address Restricted	Smithland	
8	Boston Block	Boston Block	January 3, 1985 (#85000010)	1005-1013 E. 4th St. 42°29′40″N 96°23′50″W	Sioux City	
9	Theophile Bruguier Cabin	Theophile Bruguier Cabin	August 14, 2000 (#00000918)	Riverside Park; 42°29′48″N 96°28′31″W	Sioux City	
10	Elzy G. Burkam House	Elzy G. Burkam House	July 15, 1998 (#98000864)	1525 Douglas St. 42°30′25″N 96°24′25″W	Sioux City	
11	Charles City College Hall	Charles City College Hall	January 21, 1983 (#83000412)	1501 Morningside Ave. 42°28′31″N 96°21′36″W	Sioux City	
12	Chicago, Milwaukee, St. Paul & Pacific Combination Depot-Hornick	Chicago, Milwaukee, St. Paul & Pacific Combination Depot-Hornick	September 6, 1990 (#90001309)	Main St. south of Railway St. 42°13′51″N 96°05′51″W	Hornick	
13	Crescent Park School		October 15, 2026 (#100013539)	1114 West 27th Street; 42°31′04″N 96°25′19″W	Sioux City	
14	Davidson Building	Davidson Building	June 25, 1999 (#99000736)	505 6th St. 42°29′48″N 96°24′17″W	Sioux City	
15	Dick's Diner	Dick's Diner	October 6, 2023 (#100009407)	723 West 7th St. 42°30′10″N 96°25′01″W	Sioux City	
16	East Junior High School		April 9, 2025 (#100011619)	1520 Morningside Avenue; 42°28′30″N 96°21′30″W	Sioux City	
17	Evans Block	Evans Block	January 3, 1985 (#85000011)	1126-28 4th St. 42°29′39″N 96°23′42″W	Sioux City	
18	Everett School	Everett School	November 5, 2018 (#100003066)	1314 W 3rd St. 42°29′57″N 96°25′31″W	Sioux City	
19	H.H. Everist House	H.H. Everist House	September 29, 1983 (#83000413)	37 McDonald Dr. 42°31′08″N 96°24′40″W	Sioux City	
20	Fourth Street Historic District	Fourth Street Historic District	August 15, 1995 (#95000966)	1002-1128 4th St. 42°29′39″N 96°23′46″W	Sioux City	
21	Grandview Park Music Pavilion	Grandview Park Music Pavilion	February 28, 2011 (#11000053)	Sits to the east of McDonald St. -- Entrance in 2600 block of McDonald St. 42°31′00″N 96°24′35″W	Sioux City	
22	Great Northern Railway Steam Locomotive No. 1355 and Tender 1451	Great Northern Railway Steam Locomotive No. 1355 and Tender 1451	December 15, 2004 (#04001352)	3400 Sioux River Rd. 42°31′45″N 96°28′36″W	Sioux City	
23	Holy Trinity Greek Orthodox Church	Holy Trinity Greek Orthodox Church	May 1, 1998 (#98000381)	900 6th St. 42°29′46″N 96°23′55″W	Sioux City	
24	Hubbard Park		October 10, 2023 (#100009432)	2800 Jones St. 42°31′09″N 96°24′03″W	Sioux City	
25	Dr. Van Buren Knott House	Dr. Van Buren Knott House	September 8, 1999 (#99001032)	2323 Nebraska St. 42°30′54″N 96°24′15″W	Sioux City	
26	Leeds Junior High School	Leeds Junior High School	October 24, 2002 (#02001228)	3919 Jefferson St. 42°32′15″N 96°22′04″W	Sioux City	Demolished ca. 2008
27	Lewis System Armored Car and Detective Service Building	Lewis System Armored Car and Detective Service Building	October 4, 2016 (#16000689)	700 Nebraska St. 42°29′51″N 96°24′12″W	Sioux City	
28	Martin Hotel	Martin Hotel	January 27, 1983 (#83000414)	410 Pierce St. 42°29′40″N 96°24′15″W	Sioux City	
29	T.S. Martin and Company	T.S. Martin and Company	July 15, 1998 (#98000865)	Junction of 4th St. and Nebraska St. 42°29′40″N 96°24′14″W	Sioux City	
30	Mary Elizabeth Day Nursery	Mary Elizabeth Day Nursery	October 30, 1997 (#97001293)	814 Court St. 42°29′57″N 96°23′46″W	Sioux City	
31	Milwaukee Railroad Shops Historic District		October 22, 2018 (#100002243)	3400 Sioux River Rd. 42°31′39″N 96°28′34″W	Sioux City	
32	Montgomery Ward Building		October 16, 2025 (#100012353)	413-417 Pierce Street; 42°29′42″N 96°24′18″W	Sioux City	
33	Morningside College Historic District	Morningside College Historic District	May 14, 1997 (#97000387)	Roughly bounded by Vine, Morningside, Garretson, Peters, and S. Paxton Aves. and Sioux Trail; 42°28′28″N 96°21′42″W	Sioux City	
34	Motor Mart Building	Motor Mart Building	April 22, 1993 (#93000330)	520 Nebraska St. 42°29′46″N 96°24′12″W	Sioux City	
35	Mount Sinai Temple	Mount Sinai Temple	October 21, 1999 (#99001268)	1320 Nebraska St. 42°30′18″N 96°24′10″W	Sioux City	
36	Municipal Auditorium	Municipal Auditorium	July 27, 2006 (#06000316)	500 Gordon Dr. 42°29′34″N 96°24′24″W	Sioux City	
37	Mylius-Eaton House	Mylius-Eaton House	January 13, 2004 (#03001390)	2900 Jackson St. 42°31′15″N 96°24′07″W	Sioux City	
38	New Orpheum Theatre	New Orpheum Theatre	August 25, 2000 (#00000919)	520-28 Pierce St. 42°29′44″N 96°24′17″W	Sioux City	Restored theatre complex that was built in 1927
39	James P. Newton House and Maid Cottage	James P. Newton House and Maid Cottage	March 3, 2000 (#00000154)	2312 Nebraska St. 42°30′53″N 96°24′12″W	Sioux City	
40	Julius and Anine Oversen House	Julius and Anine Oversen House	March 28, 2007 (#07000207)	2037 S. Lemon St. 42°28′08″N 96°20′33″W	Sioux City	
41	John Peirce House	John Peirce House	December 12, 1978 (#78001273)	2901 Jackson St. 42°31′15″N 96°24′08″W	Sioux City	
42	Rose Hill Historic District	Rose Hill Historic District	September 12, 2002 (#02001022)	1400-1700 blocks of Douglas St., Grandview Boulevard, and Summit St. 42°30′08″N 96°24′48″W	Sioux City	
43	St. Boniface Historic District	St. Boniface Historic District	November 5, 1998 (#98001322)	703 W. 5th St., 515 Cook St., and 700 W. 6th St. 42°30′04″N 96°25′03″W	Sioux City	
44	St. Thomas Episcopal Church	St. Thomas Episcopal Church	September 27, 1984 (#84001612)	1200 Douglas St. 42°30′11″N 96°24′23″W	Sioux City	
45	Arthur and Stella Sanford House	Arthur and Stella Sanford House	May 9, 2003 (#03000359)	1925 Summit; 42°30′39″N 96°24′36″W	Sioux City	
46	Ben and Harriet Schulein House	Ben and Harriet Schulein House	October 30, 1997 (#97001289)	2604 Jackson St. 42°31′03″N 96°24′07″W	Sioux City	Built in 1913, this represents William L. Steele's first tentative venture into the Prairie School style of architecture for which he is now best known.
47	SERGEANT FLOYD	SERGEANT FLOYD	May 5, 1989 (#89001079)	Missouri River Mile Marker 730; 42°30′04″N 96°28′21″W	Sioux City	
48	Sergeant Floyd Monument	Sergeant Floyd Monument	October 15, 1966 (#66000340)	Glenn Ave. and Lewis Rd. 42°27′45″N 96°22′39″W	Sioux City	
49	Simmons Hardware Company Warehouse	Simmons Hardware Company Warehouse	April 25, 2008 (#08000332)	323 Water St. 42°29′38″N 96°24′36″W	Sioux City	
50	Sioux City Baptist Church	Sioux City Baptist Church	October 22, 1979 (#79000953)	1301 Nebraska Ave. 42°30′15″N 96°24′14″W	Sioux City	Built in 1918 by Prairie School architect William L. Steele as the First Congregational Church, it gained NRHP status as Sioux City Baptist, and is now Iglesia Pentecostes Evangelica Principe de Paz.
51	Sioux City Central High School and Central Annex	Sioux City Central High School and Central Annex	July 23, 1974 (#74000817)	1212 Nebraska & 1121 Jackson Sts. 42°30′13″N 96°24′10″W	Sioux City	Boundary increase and rename, September 19, 2016
52	Sioux City Fire Station Number 3	Sioux City Fire Station Number 3	May 21, 2008 (#08000444)	1211 5th St. 42°29′44″N 96°23′40″W	Sioux City	
53	Sioux City Free Public Library	Sioux City Free Public Library	June 2, 1997 (#97000461)	705 6th St. 42°29′48″N 96°24′06″W	Sioux City	
54	Sioux City Linseed Oil Works	Sioux City Linseed Oil Works	January 10, 2008 (#07001359)	210 Court St. 42°29′33″N 96°23′46″W	Sioux City	
55	Sioux City Masonic Temple	Sioux City Masonic Temple	January 14, 2004 (#03001389)	820 Nebraska St. 42°29′58″N 96°24′05″W	Sioux City	
56	Sioux City Public Library (Smith Villa Branch)	Sioux City Public Library (Smith Villa Branch)	May 23, 1983 (#83000415)	1509 George Ave. 42°30′23″N 96°25′39″W	Sioux City	
57	Sioux City Public Library-North Side Branch	Sioux City Public Library-North Side Branch	December 7, 2000 (#00001479)	810 29th St. 42°31′14″N 96°24′01″W	Sioux City	
58	Swedish Evangelical Lutheran Augustana Church	Swedish Evangelical Lutheran Augustana Church	May 30, 2006 (#06000444)	600 Court St. 42°29′48″N 96°23′46″W	Sioux City	
59	United States Post Office and Courthouse	United States Post Office and Courthouse	July 17, 2013 (#13000485)	316–320 6th Street; 42°29′46″N 96°24′26″W	Sioux City	
60	Warnock Building		February 13, 2023 (#100008628)	701-705 Douglas St. 42°29′52″N 96°24′25″W	Sioux City	
61	Warrior Hotel	Warrior Hotel	June 27, 1985 (#85001384)	6th and Nebraska Sts. 42°29′48″N 96°24′14″W	Sioux City	
62	Williges Building	Williges Building	August 31, 2007 (#07000850)	613-615 Pierce St. 42°29′49″N 96°24′19″W	Sioux City	
63	Woodbury County Courthouse	Woodbury County Courthouse	December 18, 1973 (#73000744)	7th and Douglas Sts. 42°29′50″N 96°24′20″W	Sioux City	

== Former listings ==
	Name on the Register	Image	Date listed	Date removed	Location	City or town	Description
1	Florence Crittenton Home and Maternity Hospital	Florence Crittenton Home and Maternity Hospital	March 31, 2000 (#00000306)	August 16, 2018	1105-1111 28th St. 42°31′10″N 96°23′45″W	Sioux City	Home designed by William L. Steele with W.W. Beach in 1906; hospital by Beuttler & Arnold in 1913.
2	Margaretta Franz House		June 21, 1982 (#82002647)	May 22, 1998	215 Kansas St.	Sioux City	Demolished
3	Knapp-Spencer Warehouse		June 21, 1982 (#82002648)	May 22, 1998	3rd and Nebraska Sts.	Sioux City	Demolished in July, 1993
4	Lexington Block		April 11, 1986 (#86000706)	May 22, 1998	815 4th St.	Sioux City	Demolished
5	Midland Packing Company	Midland Packing Company	January 25, 1979 (#79000952)	March 7, 2019	2001 Leech Ave. 42°29′19″N 96°22′59″W	Sioux City	Demolished in 2009

== See also ==
- List of National Historic Landmarks in Iowa
- National Register of Historic Places listings in Iowa
- Listings in neighboring counties: Cherokee, Dakota (NE), Ida, Monona, Plymouth, Thurston (NE), Union (SD)
