= Evans Block =

Evans Block may refer to:

- Evans Block (Sioux City, Iowa), listed on the National Register of Historic Places in Woodbury County, Iowa
- Evans Block (Lancaster, New Hampshire), listed on the New Hampshire State Register of Historic Places
- Evans Block (Smithville, Tennessee), listed on the National Register of Historic Places in De Kalb County, Tennessee

== See also ==
- Evans House (disambiguation)
