= Augustana =

Augustana may refer to:

In religion:

- The Augustana or Augsburg Confession, which gives its name to several Lutheran institutions
- Augustana Evangelical Lutheran Church, a Lutheran religious body from the 1860 until 1962
- Augustana Lutheran Church (Sioux City, Iowa), listed on the National Register of Historic Places as the Swedish Evangelical Lutheran Augustana Church

In education:

- Augustana Academy, a former educational institute in South Dakota
- Augustana College (Illinois), a liberal arts college in Illinois
- Augustana University (South Dakota), a liberal arts college in South Dakota
- Augustana University College, a formerly Lutheran college in Alberta
- The University of Alberta Augustana Faculty of the University of Alberta, the present incarnation of the former Augustana University College after its merger with the University of Alberta
- Augustana Divinity School (Neuendettelsau), a divinity school of the Evangelical Lutheran Church in Bavaria in Neuendettelsau, Germany

In music:

- Augustana (band), a rock band from California
- Augustana (album), the rock band's third, self-titled album

In sports:

- Augustana (Illinois) Vikings, the athletic program of Augustana College in Illinois
- Augustana University Vikings, the athletic program of Augustana University in South Dakota
