= Neighborhoods of Sioux City, Iowa =

The following is a list of neighborhoods and commercial districts in Sioux City, Iowa.

== Neighborhoods ==
=== North Side ===
- The North Side is the colloquial reference to the mostly residential neighborhood north of about 18th Street and ending near North High School. The former home of the Sioux City Public Museum, the historic John Peirce house, is a fine example of a Victorian home in this neighborhood; it was built from Sioux Falls rose quartzite (see Sioux Quartzite for the rock unit) in 1890.
- The Near North Side is the area just north of the main downtown business district, extending from 7th or 8th Street up to 14th Street, and bordered by Floyd Boulevard to the east and McDonald Street to the west. The Cathedral of the Epiphany, with its impressive twin spires, and adjacent Bishop Heelan Catholic High School are located in the Near North Side. The great stone "Castle on the Hill," formerly Central High School, is likewise in this neighborhood.
- Indian Hills starting at 27th and Cheyenne Boulevard, extending to North Outer Drive to the north and Floyd Boulevard to the east. Homes in this area were built between the 1960s and 1980s.
- Country Club is bordered by Hamilton Boulevard to the east and 36th Street to the south, and extends up the Perry Creek valley to the Plymouth County line. Characterized by traditional mansions and sprawling ranch style houses.
- Leeds is a mostly residential neighborhood northeast of downtown Sioux City, centered near 41st Street at Floyd Boulevard. North–south streets in Leeds are named after American presidents.
- Rose Hill is a neighborhood characterized by large, century-old houses. It is roughly bordered by 12th Street to the south, McDonald Street to the west, Jackson Street to the east, and Grandview Park to the north. It is dotted with ethnic restaurants, laundromats and trendy coffee houses, tattoo parlors, pool halls, tiny art galleries, and import shops.
- Gilman Terrace is a neighborhood lining the 19th Street corridor as it cuts through the bluff and descends westward from the Heights toward Hamilton Boulevard. It formerly included one of the city's most popular parks with a public athletic field and outdoor skating rink in winter, as well as Heelan High School's Memorial Field. Today it is home to a strip mall and Memorial Field.
- The Heights lies between Grandview Park and Hamilton Boulevard, including East and West Solway, Kennedy Drive, and McDonald Drive. In this area are large estates from the 1890s to 1940s including Prairie School, Victorian, Georgian, and Colonial homes.

=== East Side ===
- Kelly Park, including Cole's Addition, is a blue-collar residential area centered on the municipal park of the same name. It is situated directly east of Highway 75 and spans several blocks of eastern Sioux City from East 7th to about East 18th Street.
- Springdale is a smaller neighborhood along 28th Street on the east side of Sioux City, near the Floyd River.
- Greenville is a neighborhood corresponding to the lower Bacon Creek valley along Old Correctionville Road and also includes residences and small businesses along the original Floyd River channel just upstream from the Stockyards. It is home to the historic Floyd Cemetery.
- Morningside is the blanket term for the hilly southeast quadrant of Sioux City. Morningside is somewhat demarcated by old U.S. Highway 75 (at South Lewis Blvd.) at the western end and old U.S. Highway 20 (at Gordon Drive) on the northern end. It was originally a streetcar suburb in the late 19th century. Morningside was originally promoted by the entrepreneur and settler Edwin Peters, who made his home near the original commercial center of the suburb, known as "Peters Park". Peters Park was also the location of the fine Victorian home of Arthur Garretson, which was situated at the eastern terminus of the Sioux City Elevated Railway. For many years, the elegant Garretson mansion served as the Morningside Public Library. However, in the 1960s it was razed amidst much controversy, and replaced by a modern structure. Peters Park is also home to Morningside University, founded in 1894. Today Morningside is a large sprawling area of Sioux City containing numerous distinctive neighborhoods. As a whole, Morningside is a mix of older residential neighborhoods and commercial corridors. Peters Park is the historical commercial center of Morningside, although a boom of commercial development in the Southern Hills area since 1980 has dwarfed Peters Park's own commercial area.
- Polack Hill is a Morningside neighborhood. The district is situated on one of the highest bluffs in the city at the westernmost edge of Morningside, and is bounded roughly by Pulaski Park and South Lewis Blvd. on the west, South Helen St. on the east, Vine Avenue on the south and Gordon Drive on the north. Historic St. Casimir's Church, built by the Lithuanian immigrants in 1915, was located near the north end of this neighborhood.
- Cecelia Park is a small district in west-central Morningside dominated by a municipal park, a traffic turnabout and a small but thriving commercial area. Cecelia Park lies some 1.5 miles north of Peter's Park, at the northwestern end of Morningside Avenue.
- Southern Hills is the newest area of residential development in Morningside, as well as being the dominant commercial district of the city.
- Sunnyside is the area between Bushnell and Seger Avenues and bordered by Morningside Avenue and Lakeport.
- Singing Hills is the new development that begins south of Singing Hills Boulevard and is bordered by Old Lakeport Road and Highway 75.

=== West Side ===
- The West Side is the blanket term for the areas west of Wesley Parkway, where the numbered streets are named West 4th Street, West 14th Street, etc. It is a mix of low-income and middle-class residential neighborhoods. Liberty, Emerson, Riverside, and Crescent Park Elementary schools as well as West Middle School and West High School serve this area of Sioux City.
- Riverside is a flat, blue collar residential area on the west side of Sioux City, along the banks and floodplain of the Big Sioux River. Riverside is historically significant as the site of original land holdings of the first white settler in the territory-- Theophile Bruguier—whose farm included hundreds of acres running from the mouth of the Big Sioux River northwest toward the South Dakota state line—much of that area which today comprises suburb of Riverside.
- Smith-Villa is a neighborhood on the upper west side of Sioux City generally bounded by West 20th Street on the north, Villa Avenue on the south, Center Street and Perry Creek on the east and West Street on the west. Smith Elementary School has served this area since 1899, and was built as a mansion in 1892. A new school is being built around the mansion, and it is planned to be torn down after the new school opens. The new school, Liberty Elementary School, opened its doors in 2011. It also replaced Everett Elementary School.
- Prospect Hill, located on the lower west side of Sioux City is one of the city's oldest residential neighborhoods, situated within walking distance of downtown. It is bordered on the west by Cook Street, on the north by West 3rd Street, and on the east and south by the hill's edge. A monument erected by Christian missionaries is situated at the top of the hill, which also provides a panoramic view of the city as well as South Sioux City, Nebraska, Union County, South Dakota, and the Missouri River.
- Woodbury Heights, a newer development located in the hills on the western side of Sioux City. This area is bordered by W. 4th and Burton Streets, with Fieldcrest Drive being the main entrance to the neighborhood.

=== Former neighborhoods ===
- The South Bottoms was a working-class neighborhood located west of the stockyards that was later destroyed to make way for Interstate 29 and a channelization project on the Floyd River. A South Bottoms Memorial was created in 1997 to honor the immigrants and families who made this area of town their home.

== Commercial districts ==
- Downtown is the main business district. It extends from the Riverfront up to about 8th Street, and is flanked by the West Side and by Floyd Boulevard. Many buildings of architectural and historical interest are located here, including the Woodbury County Courthouse. The Courthouse is on the National Register of Historic Places and is a National Historic Landmark. It was designed in the Prairie School style by Sioux City architect William L. Steele in collaboration with Minneapolis architects William Purcell and George Elmslie. Steele, a protégé of Louis Sullivan, was active in Sioux City during the early twentieth century and has a large body of work represented there.

Also located downtown is the Orpheum Theater, originally designed by the Chicago architects Rapp and Rapp, and built in 1927. The Orpheum was renovated in 2001 and has since hosted Broadway shows, international musical performers, and on special occasions, the Sioux City Symphony Orchestra. The Tyson Events Center is located near the riverfront, and is a 10,000-seat venue for conventions, entertainment, and sports events; it is the home of the Sioux City Musketeers, a team affiliated with the United States Hockey League - an amateur hockey league.

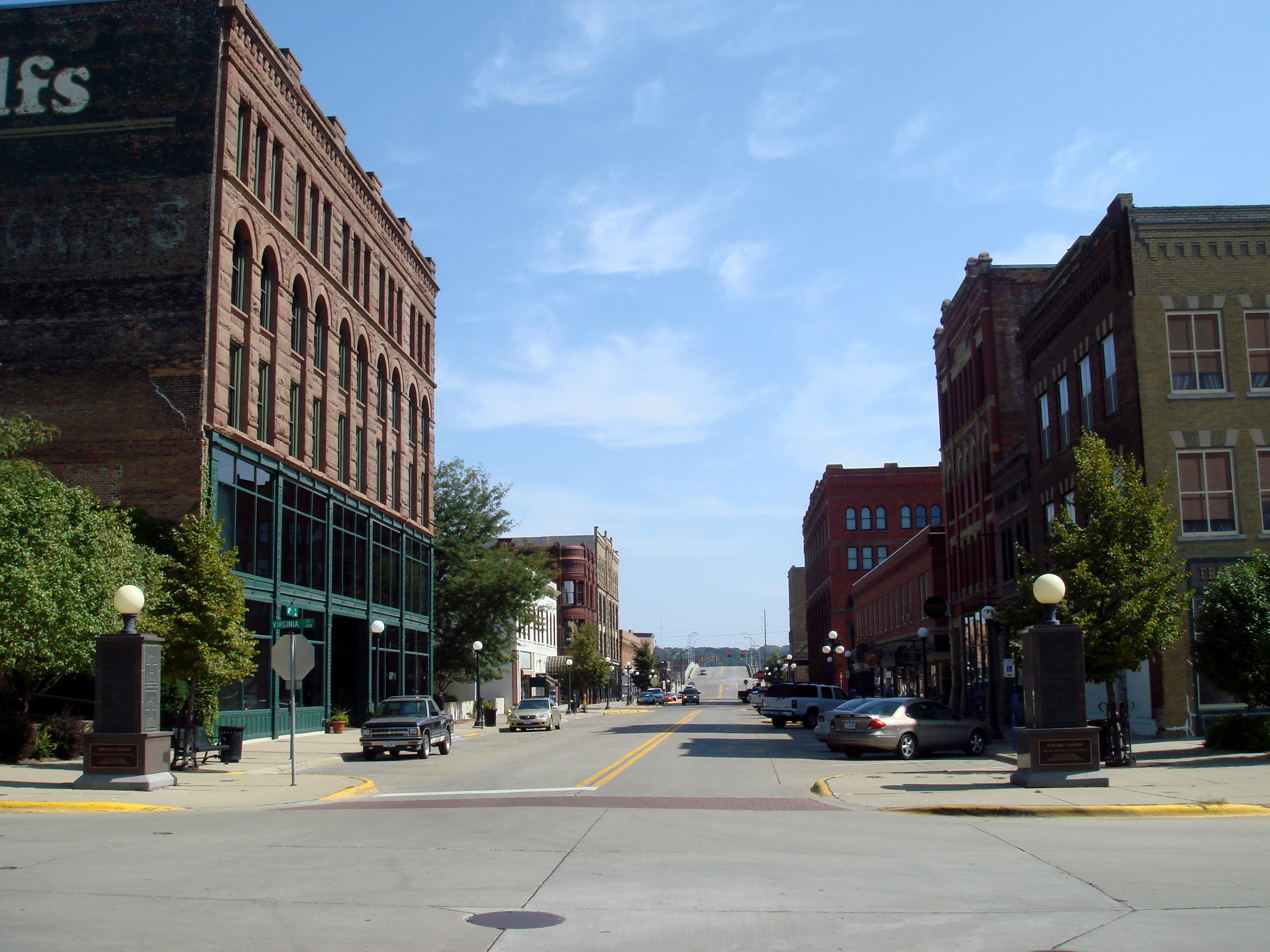
Historic Fourth Street

- Historic Fourth Street (also called "Lower Fourth Street") is a district on the east side of the main downtown area that is enjoying a renaissance. It is home to many of the older commercial buildings in the city, many of them designed in the Richardsonian Romanesque style, and of considerable architectural importance. From the 1880s to the early 20th century, this was a high-property-value district, containing magnificent buildings such as the Peavey Grand Opera House, the New Oxford Hotel, the Plymouth Block, the Chicago House Hotel & Convention Center, and many other grand and architecturally unique structures.
- The Stockyards is an historically important district located along the original lower Floyd River channel. Formerly one of the largest livestock trading facilities in the world, the Sioux City Stockyards was also home to large meatpacking plants (or "packing houses"), including Armour and Company and Swift and Company, who employed a significant number of residents. In its heyday, the Stockyards commercial corridor included the historic Livestock Exchange Bank as well as the offices of cattle companies, tack-and-saddleries, boot and western wear stores, lumber yards and hardware stores, restaurants and saloons. Following the closure of most of the meatpacking plants, and of the livestock yards themselves, the area became inactive, with only a few small businesses remaining. However, recently a very large retail lumber and home improvement center opened here.
- Southern Hills is a large, newer commercial area of shopping malls and self-standing restaurants, shops, banks, medical and dental clinics, and other service industries. Sioux City's only shopping mall, Southern Hills Mall, and several additional smaller strip malls anchor a commercial district. It is located on the southern fringe of Morningside in the Loess Hills.
