= Charles Floyd (explorer) =

American explorer (1782–1804)

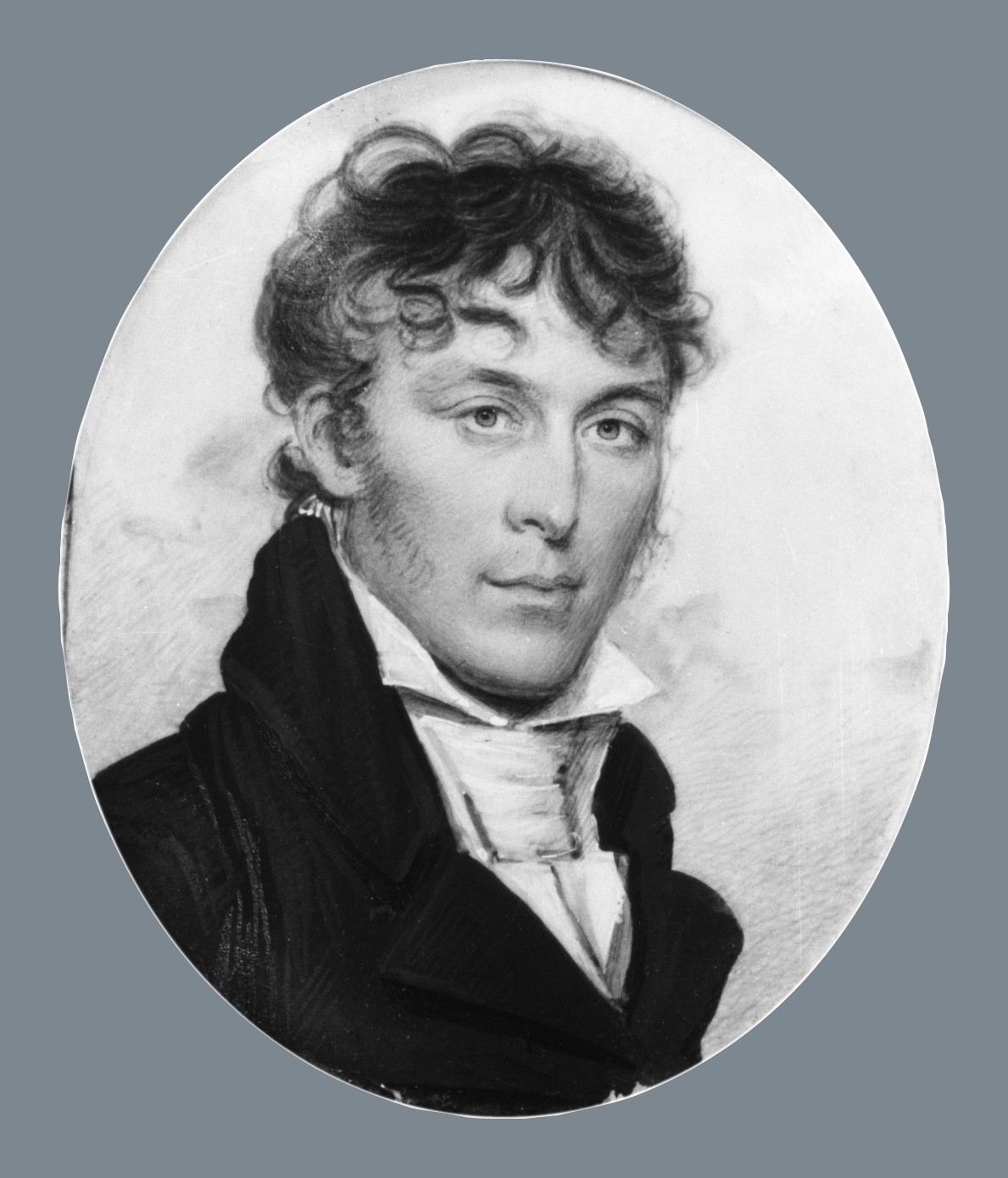
- Portrait by Benjamin Trott, 1804.
- Born: June 20, 1782; Floyd's Station, Virginia
- Died: August 20, 1804 (aged 22); Missouri River, north of Sioux City, Iowa
- Burial place: Sergeant Floyd Monument, Sioux City, Iowa
- Military career
- Branch: United States Army
- Service years: 1803–1804
- Rank: Sergeant
- Unit: Corps of Discovery
- Missions: Lewis and Clark Expedition

Charles Floyd (June 20, 1782 – August 20, 1804) was an American explorer who served as Quartermaster in the Corps of Discovery during the Lewis and Clark Expedition, but died within the first four months of the 28-month expedition. He was one of the expedition's "Nine Young Men from Kentucky" and was the only member of the mission to die on it.

== Early life ==
Charles Floyd was born on June 20, 1782, to Lillian and Robert Floyd at Floyd Station, a frontier fort near the Beargrass Creek in the Kentucky County of Virginia. Robert was a Virginian who served in the Revolutionary War under the command of George Rogers Clark and came to the Kentucky District where he established Floyd Station with his brother James John Floyd in 1780.

In 1799 the family moved into the Northwest Territory in what is now southern Indiana where they operated a ferry business across the Ohio River. After the formation of Clark County in 1801, Charles was named first constable when he was 19–20 years old.

== Lewis and Clark Expedition ==
On August 11, 1803, Floyd enlisted in the Corps of Discovery for the Lewis and Clark Expedition to explore the Louisiana Territory. William Clark had been a family friend and recruited Floyd, grooming him as a non-commissioned officer. Meriwether Lewis had placed Floyd in command of the officers' quarters during their absence in St. Louis and in April 1804, he was promoted to Sergeant. Floyd began to keep a journal on May 14, the day the expedition departed from Camp Dubois, located along the Wood River in modern-day Illinois.

Floyd's journal entries from early June note the beauty he saw in the landscape along the Missouri River and on July 31, he wrote "I am very sick and have been for sometime but have recovered my health again." However, this apparent recovery was soon followed by a severe turn for the worse with Clark noting that he was "very unwell." The expedition had no dedicated doctors and Floyd was attended to by York while the captains negotiated with representatives of the Otoe people. Floyds last journal entry on August 18 noted that "the Grand Chief of the Otoes" had arrived at camp and that same day, Clark noted that Floyd was seriously ill. On August 20 after the expedition had reached the site of present-day Sioux City, Iowa, Floyd died shortly after noon from peritonitis. Clark said that Floyd had died "with a great deal of composure" and that his final words were, "I am going away. Please write me a letter."

A funeral was held and Floyd was buried on a bluff overlooking the Missouri River. The expedition named the location Floyd's Bluff in his honor. They camped that night at the mouth of Floyd River, "about 30 yards wide, a beautiful evening.--"

Clark diagnosed the condition which led to Floyd's demise as bilious colic, though modern doctors and historians believe Floyd's death was more likely to have been caused by a ruptured appendix. The brief "recovery" Floyd described may have represented the temporary relief afforded by the bursting of the organ, which would have been followed by a fatal peritonitis. If that were the case, because there was no known cure for appendicitis at that time, he would have been no better off had he been with the best physicians of the day.

== Legacy ==
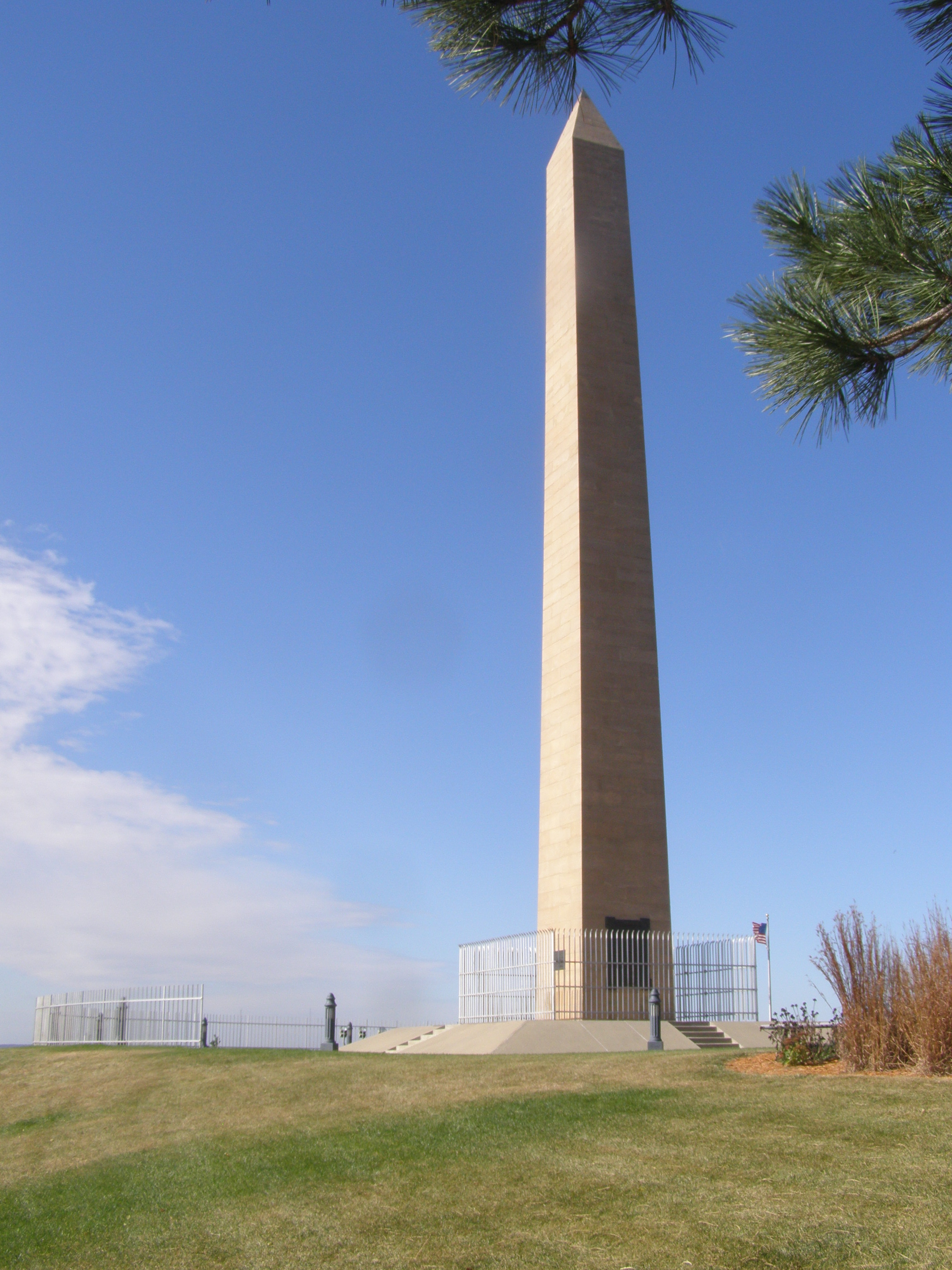
Sergeant Floyd Monument

After Floyd's expedition journal was published in 1894, new interest was taken in him and his grave-marker was stolen. He was re-buried once more on August 20, 1895, with a monument. A marble cornerstone three feet wide and seven feet long was placed in 1900. When the Sergeant Floyd Monument, an obelisk of white sandstone standing 100 feet (30 m) high, was completed on May 30, 1901, Floyd's grave was moved for the fourth time to rest nearby. It was designated a National Historic Landmark on June 30, 1960. This monument is located in Sioux City, Iowa, in a 23-acre (93,000 m^{2}) park that offers visitors a view of the Missouri River valley.

Charles Floyd is the namesake of Floyd County, Iowa. The town of Sergeant Bluff is named in honor of Floyd. The Interstate 129 bridge between Sioux City and South Sioux City, Nebraska is named the Sergeant Floyd Memorial Bridge in his honor. Floyd's Bluff is currently within the city limits of Sioux City.

The towboat Sergeant Floyd, launched in 1932, is also named after Floyd. The boat is also a U.S. National Historic Landmark, part of the Sergeant Floyd River Museum & Welcome Center.
