= Sergeant Bluff, Iowa =

- City
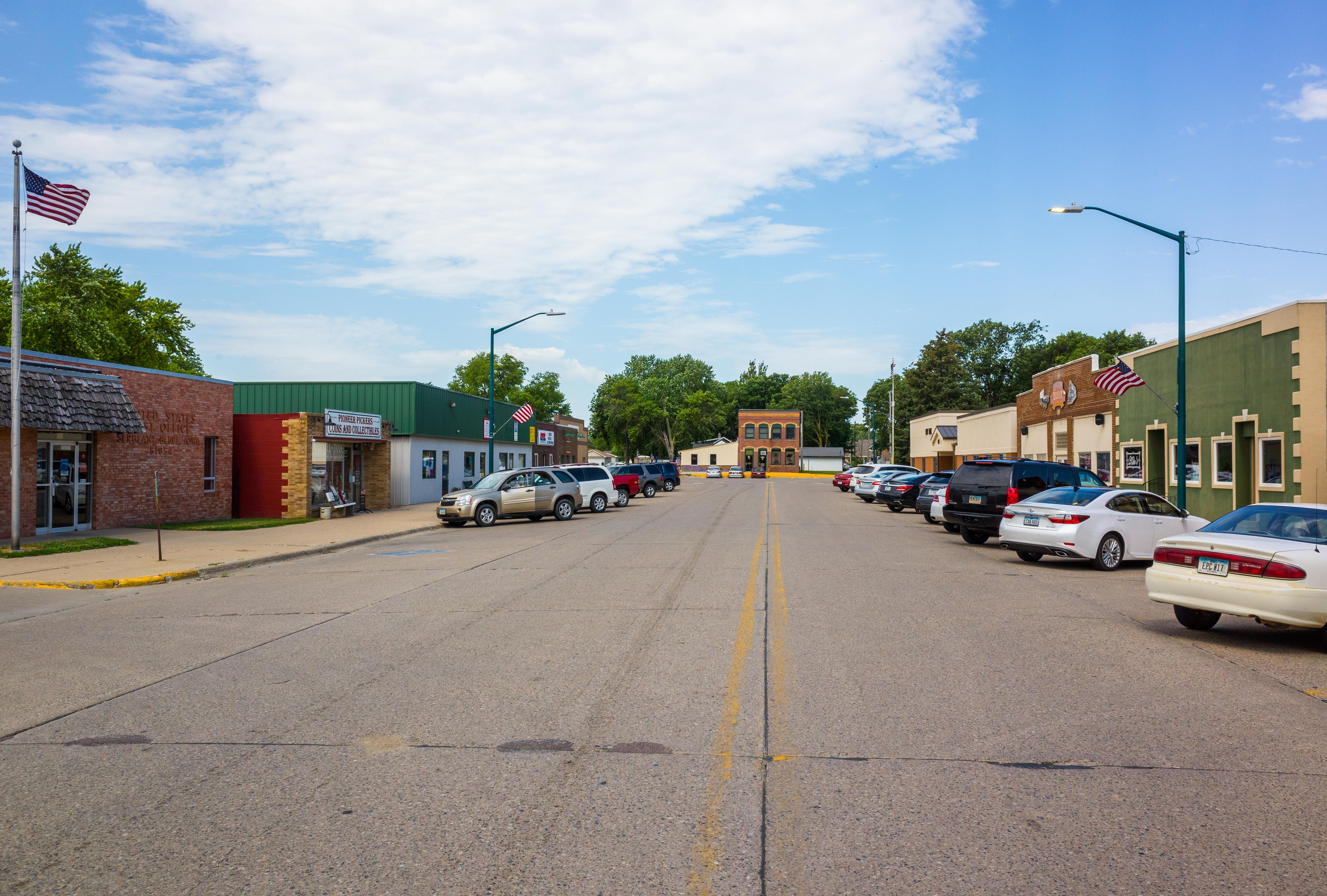
- Looking West on 4th Street
- Motto: "Remember the Past, Embrace the Future"
- Location of Sergeant Bluff, Iowa
- Coordinates: 42°23′52″N 96°21′06″W
- Country: United States
- State: Iowa
- County: Woodbury
- Named for: Sergeant Charles Floyd

Government
  - Mayor: Jon Winkel

Area
  - Total: 2.97 sq mi (7.70 km^{2})
  - Land: 2.97 sq mi (7.70 km^{2})
  - Water: 0 sq mi (0.00 km^{2})
- Elevation: 1,093 ft (333 m)

Population (2020)
  - Total: 5,015
  - Density: 1,687.4/sq mi (651.52/km^{2})
- Time zone: UTC-6 (Central (CST))
  - Summer (DST): UTC-5 (CDT)
- ZIP code: 51054
- Area code: 712
- FIPS code: 19-71625
- GNIS feature ID: 2396575
- Website: City of Sergeant Bluff, Iowa Website

Sergeant Bluff is a city in Woodbury County, Iowa, United States. It is part of the Sioux City, IA–NE–SD Metropolitan Statistical Area. The population was 5,015 at the time of the 2020 census.

== History ==
The city was named in honor of U.S. Army Sergeant Charles Floyd, a native of Kentucky who was one of the first men to enlist in the Lewis and Clark Expedition in the early 1800s. Just three months into the two-year journey, Floyd became violently ill and died the next day, August 20, 1804, of what is believed to have been a ruptured appendix. He was buried on a hill overlooking an unnamed river on the Iowa side of the Missouri River. In his honor, the expedition's leaders, Meriwether Lewis and William Clark, named the river Floyd River and the hill Floyd's Bluff, now part of Sioux City. Floyd was the expedition's only casualty.

The village of Sergeant Bluff was started in 1852, south of what became Sioux City, and under the name of Sergeant's Bluff City, it become the first town in Woodbury County. The city was incorporated May 2, 1904 in the centennial year of Floyd's death.

== Geography ==
According to the United States Census Bureau, the city has a total area of 2.11 square miles (5.46 km^{2}), all land.

The city is located just south of Sioux City at the edge of the Loess Hills. The Sioux Gateway Airport (SUX) is adjacent to Sergeant Bluff, on the floodplain of the Missouri River. The city is home to a large brickmaking industry, and is near the Port Neal industrial complex. Interstate 29 cuts through the city, dividing residential and industrial areas.

== Demographics ==
Historical populations
Year	Pop.	±%
1880	167	—
1890	425	+154.5%
1910	525	+23.5%
1920	548	+4.4%
1930	569	+3.8%
1940	587	+3.2%
1950	569	−3.1%
1960	813	+42.9%
1970	1,164	+43.2%
1980	2,416	+107.6%
1990	2,772	+14.7%
2000	3,321	+19.8%
2010	4,227	+27.3%
2020	5,015	+18.6%
Source:"U.S. Census website". United States Census Bureau. and Iowa Data Center; Source: U.S. Decennial Census

=== 2020 census ===
As of the 2020 census, Sergeant Bluff had a population of 5,015, with 1,731 households and 1,312 families. The median age was 37.2 years. 28.3% of residents were under the age of 18 and 14.4% of residents were 65 years of age or older. For every 100 females there were 96.4 males, and for every 100 females age 18 and over there were 93.6 males age 18 and over.

99.9% of residents lived in urban areas, while 0.1% lived in rural areas.

Of the 1,731 households, 40.5% had children under the age of 18 living in them. Of all households, 58.8% were married-couple households, 8.5% were cohabiting-couple households, 13.9% were households with a male householder and no spouse or partner present, and 18.9% were households with a female householder and no spouse or partner present. Non-families made up 24.2% of all households. About 18.8% of all households were made up of individuals and 9.0% had someone living alone who was 65 years of age or older.

There were 1,822 housing units, of which 5.0% were vacant. The homeowner vacancy rate was 0.7% and the rental vacancy rate was 7.4%. The population density was 1,687.4 inhabitants per square mile (651.5/km^{2}), and there were 613.1 housing units per square mile (236.7/km^{2}).

Racial composition as of the 2020 census
Race	Number	Percent
White	4,327	86.3%
Black or African American	81	1.6%
American Indian and Alaska Native	54	1.1%
Asian	141	2.8%
Native Hawaiian and Other Pacific Islander	5	0.1%
Some other race	91	1.8%
Two or more races	316	6.3%
Hispanic or Latino (of any race)	319	6.4%

=== 2010 census ===
As of the census of 2010, there were 4,227 people, 1,464 households, and 1,142 families living in the city. The population density was 2,003.3 inhabitants per square mile (773.5/km^{2}). There were 1,499 housing units at an average density of 710.4 per square mile (274.3/km^{2}). The racial makeup of the city was 93.1% White, 1.1% African American, 0.8% Native American, 2.1% Asian, 1.0% from other races, and 1.9% from two or more races. Hispanic or Latino of any race were 3.3% of the population.

There were 1,464 households, of which 45.8% had children under the age of 18 living with them, 61.0% were married couples living together, 11.3% had a female householder with no husband present, 5.7% had a male householder with no wife present, and 22.0% were non-families. 17.7% of all households were made up of individuals, and 7.3% had someone living alone who was 65 years of age or older. The average household size was 2.88 and the average family size was 3.25.

The median age in the city was 35.5 years. 32.1% of residents were under the age of 18; 6.7% were between the ages of 18 and 24; 26.3% were from 25 to 44; 25.4% were from 45 to 64; and 9.3% were 65 years of age or older. The gender makeup of the city was 48.9% male and 51.1% female.

=== 2000 census ===
As of the census of 2000, there were 3,321 people, 1,137 households, and 891 families living in the city. The population density was 1,668.7 inhabitants per square mile (644.3/km^{2}). There were 1,176 housing units at an average density of 590.9 per square mile (228.1/km^{2}). The racial makeup of the city was 94.49% White, 0.90% African American, 0.72% Native American, 1.78% Asian, 0.72% from other races, and 1.39% from two or more races. Hispanic or Latino of any race were 1.90% of the population.

There were 1,137 households, out of which 49.5% had children under the age of 18 living with them, 61.5% were married couples living together, 13.2% had a female householder with no husband present, and 21.6% were non-families. 17.9% of all households were made up of individuals, and 5.4% had someone living alone who was 65 years of age or older. The average household size was 2.91 and the average family size was 3.27.

Age spread: 33.5% under the age of 18, 8.9% from 18 to 24, 31.0% from 25 to 44, 19.5% from 45 to 64, and 7.1% who were 65 years of age or older. The median age was 31 years. For every 100 females, there were 97.8 males. For every 100 females age 18 and over, there were 90.6 males.

The median income for a household in the city was $46,630, and the median income for a family was $53,344. Males had a median income of $35,771 versus $25,685 for females. The per capita income for the city was $19,320. About 4.4% of families and 5.5% of the population were below the poverty line, including 5.8% of those under age 18 and 6.6% of those age 65 or over.

== Economy ==
=== Industry ===
Much of Sioux City's industry is located on the downstream side of Sergeant Bluff. This includes two large coal-burning power plants, an ammonia fertilizer plant, a large pork processing plant, and a soybean processor. All of these are in the sprawling Port Neal Landing industrial park, which is surrounded by cornfields and the Missouri River. The terrain here is very flat, because it used to be in the river's flood plain.

The 185th Air Refueling Wing (ARW) of the Iowa Air National Guard operates KC-135R Stratotankers out of Sioux Gateway Airport (SUX), which is located just west of Sergeant Bluff. No on-base lodging is provided by the 185th, however, lodging in Sergeant Bluff includes an Econo Lodge and a Motel 6.

== Education ==
The Sergeant Bluff-Luton School District and its four schools — primary, elementary, middle, and high — serve the children of Sergeant Bluff.

== Infrastructure ==
=== Transportation ===
The nearest long-distance coach service is at the bus terminal in Sioux City. Jefferson Lines provides service to destinations such as Omaha.

The nearest Amtrak train station is located in Omaha.

The nearest airport is the Sioux Gateway Airport, which is located across the overpass over Interstate 29.

Transit in the city is provided by Sioux City Transit. Route 11 provides bus service connecting the city to Sioux City, Iowa as well as the airport.
