= Floyd's Bluff =

Bluff in Sioux City, Iowa

Coordinates: 42.4626°N 96.3778°W

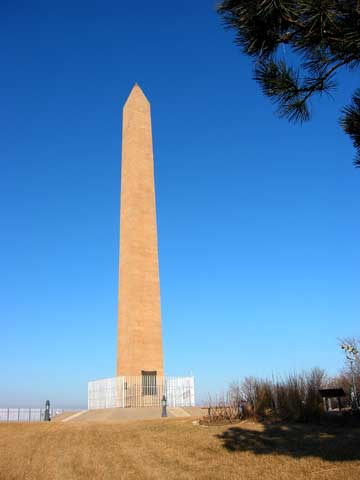
Sergeant Floyd Monument; completed 1901

Floyd's Bluff is a hill in southern Sioux City, Iowa that is named for Sergeant Charles Floyd.

== History ==
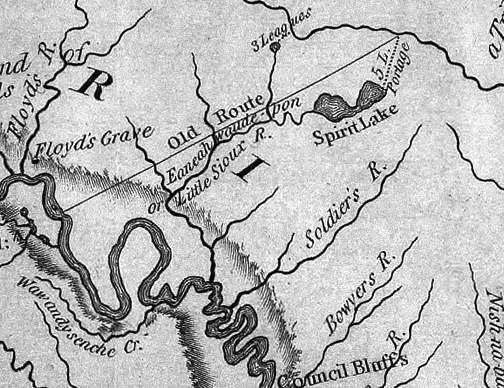
A Lewis and Clark map of 1814 shows Floyd's Grave (left on map) and the rivers of western Iowa.

Floyd, who was the quartermaster for the Lewis and Clark Expedition, would be the Corps of Discovery's only fatality during its two-year expedition to the Pacific Ocean. After dying from suspected appendicitis in 1804, he was buried on a bluff overlooking the Missouri River; which was named in his honor. Almost a century later, the Sergeant Floyd Monument was erected just above the east bank of the Missouri River, and just downstream from the mouth of the Floyd River. The bluff itself is part of the Loess Hills formation.

In 1848, the Floyd's Bluff area was settled by William Thompson, a veteran of the Mexican–American War. He established a trading post, and registered the name "Floyd's Bluff" as the name for his city. However urbanization never occurred as subsequent settlers preferred the area between the mouths of the Floyd and Big Sioux Rivers where Sioux City was established in the 1850s. Floyd's Bluff eventually was incorporated into Sioux City with the development of the suburb of Morningside in the 1870s.

In 1960, the Sergeant Floyd Monument was recognized by the U.S. Department of Interior, becoming the first National Historic Landmark. The Floyd Monument is now within a 23-acre (93,000 m^{2}) park that overlooks the Missouri River valley. Floyd's final resting place is located on old U.S. Highway 75, in the southern part of Sioux City, Iowa.

== See also ==
- Sergeant Floyd Monument
