= Albertson and Company-Rocklin Manufacturing Company =

- Albertson and Company- Rocklin Manufacturing Company
- U.S. National Register of Historic Places
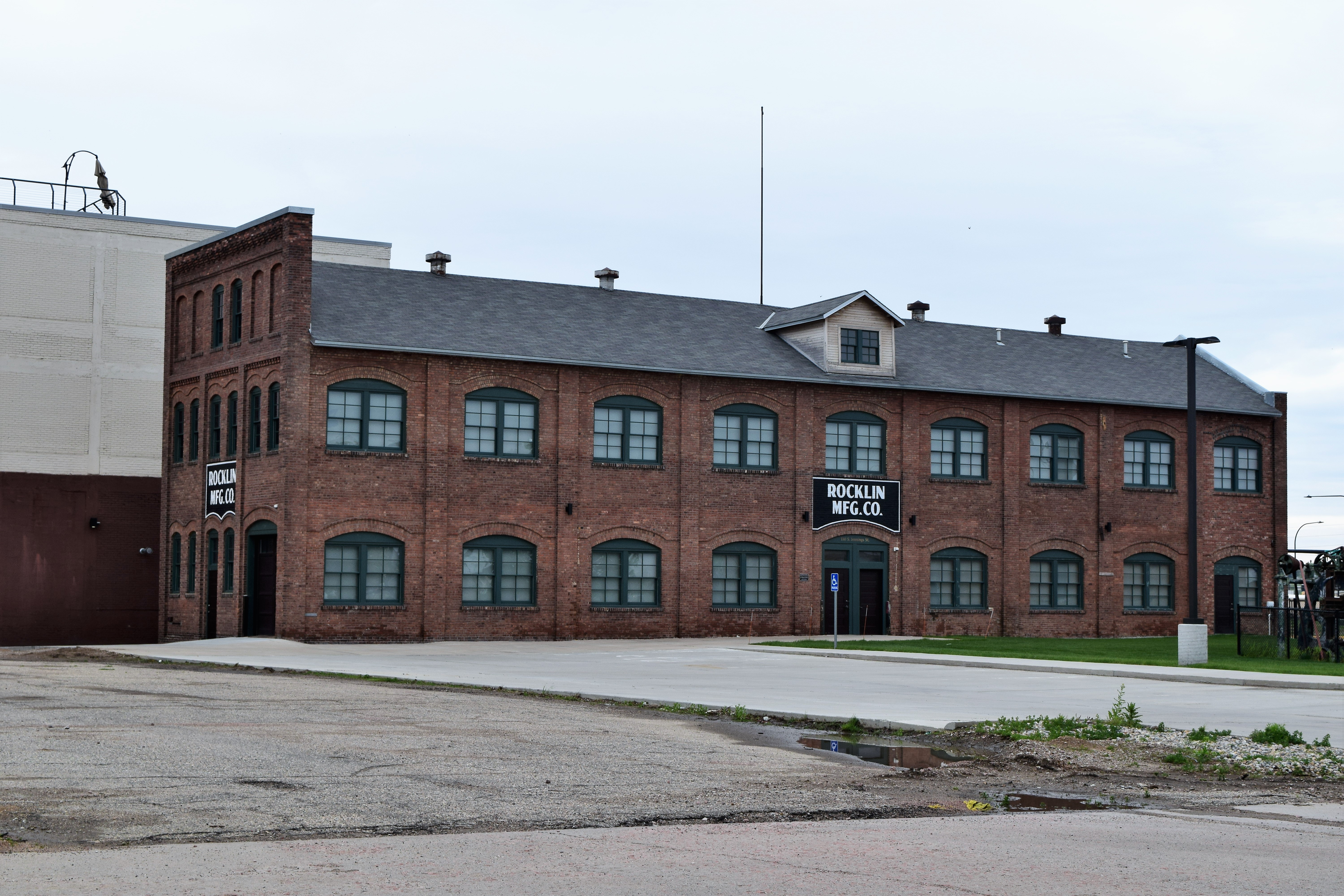

- Location within Iowa Location within the United States
- Location: 110 S. Jennings St. Sioux City, Iowa
- Coordinates: 42°29′25.2″N 96°23′55.3″W
- Built: 1912
- NRHP reference No.: 100003944
- Added to NRHP: May 9, 2019

Albertson and Company-Rocklin Manufacturing Company is a historic building located in Sioux City, Iowa, United States. Completed in 1912, the building initially housed Automatic Valve Seating Mach Co. They reorganized in 1914 and became the Sioux City Machine and Tool Company, which produced spark plugs and tire valves. The company failed four months later and the shop foreman, Frans Oscar Albertson, formed Albertson & Co. and took over the plant. During World War I they supplied 6,000 piston rings and repair tools for munition plants for Canada. Albertson never owned the building and moved his operations to another Sioux City building in 1920. The company went on to become the largest manufacturer of portable electronic and air tools in the world. They changed their name to Sioux Tools Inc., and in 1993 they became a division of Snap-On Tools. Their manufacturing facility moved to North Carolina in 2001.

Between 1921 and 1942, this building had several owners and uses. I.J. Rocklin acquired it for his company in 1942. He founded his farm equipment business in 1934 and expanded during World War II manufacturing equipment for the Chrysler Corporation, International Harvester, and Allis-Chalmers. They also supplied the Chicago Ordnance District and the Tank Automotive Center at the Detroit Arsenal. Their expansion at that time included building two additional structures on the same property. After the war, they no longer need all of the space and consolidated their operations into the newer buildings while letting the 1912 structure deteriorate. Rocklin developed the Rocklinizer in the 1960s. It "applies a thin coating of tungsten or titanium carbide to industrial surfaces (like the tip of a drill bit), lending an extremely durable edge. Decades later the firm developed the MoldMender, which repairs steel molds and dies." When the company decided to move from its World War II-era buildings they chose to renovate their historic building rather than tear it down and build a new structure. Renovations began in early 2017 and were completed in August 2018. The two-story brick building was listed on the National Register of Historic Places in 2019.

== See also ==
- Rocklin Manufacturing
