= Julius and Anine Oversen House =

Historic house in Iowa, United States

- U.S. National Register of Historic Places
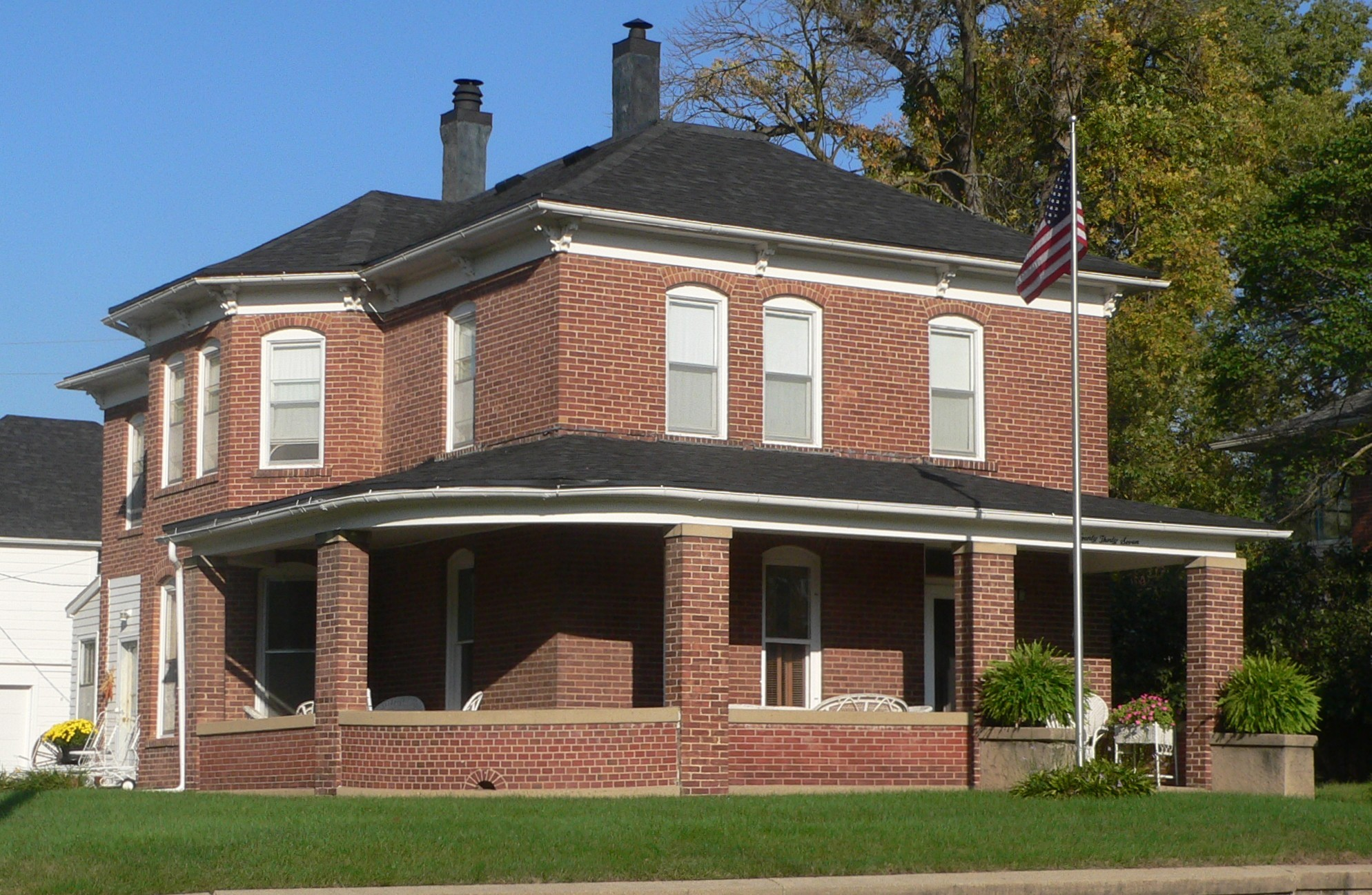

- Location within Iowa Location within the United States
- Location: 2037 S. Lemon St. Sioux City, Iowa
- Coordinates: 42°28′08.4″N 96°20′33.2″W
- Area: less than one acre
- Built: 1899-1900
- Architectural style: Italianate
- NRHP reference No.: 07000207
- Added to NRHP: March 28, 2007

The Julius and Anine Oversen House is a historic building located in Sioux City, Iowa, United States. In 1888 D.T. and Mary Hedges sold the property on which this house and surrounding neighborhood sits to the city for development. This was in a period of economic expansion that saw Sioux City grow to become the second largest city in Iowa. Julius Oversen worked as a brick mason. He worked on the Sergeant Floyd Monument (1901) in Sioux City. He may have served as contractor for this house, which he had built for his family from 1899 to 1900. This section of the city is called Morningside, and at the time this house was built, the street in front was called Live Oak Street. It was changed to South Lemon Street in 1911 when Sioux City adjusted the names on the streets and addresses in Morningside to correlate with the rest of the city. The two-story brick Italianate house features a wraparound porch, segmental-arched windows, bracketed eaves, and a low-pitched hip roof. In addition to the house, the historic designation of this property includes a two-story frame carriage house, a cistern, an inground planter in the front of the house, and two hitching posts near the street. They were all listed together on the National Register of Historic Places in 2007.
