= Southern Hills Mall =

Shopping mall in Sioux City, Iowa, U.S.

- Location: Sioux City, Iowa
- Coordinates: 42.446°N 96.353°W
- Opened: March 5, 1980; 46 years ago
- Developer: General Growth Properties
- Manager: Kohan Retail Investment Group
- Owner: Kohan Retail Investment Group
- Num. of stores: 205 (at peak)
- Num. of anchor tenants: 4
- Floor area: 1,235,260 square feet (114,759 m^{2})
- Floors: 1 (2 in Ashley Furniture, staff mezzanine in Scheels All Sports)
- Public transit: Sioux City Transit
- Website: southernhillsmall.com

Southern Hills Mall is an enclosed regional shopping mall in Sioux City, Iowa. The mall draws approximately 6 million visitors each year, primarily from the Siouxland region of Iowa, Nebraska, and South Dakota. The mall's anchor stores are JCPenney, Tilt Studio, Ashley HomeStore, Furniture Mart, and Scheels.

== History ==
Plans for an enclosed mall in Sioux City were discussed as early as 1969. However, these plans faced opposition by downtown advocates, including city council members who favored urban renewal in the downtown area instead. While the developer was forced to move its proposed mall site from the industrial area north of the Sioux Gateway Airport to the southern edge of the Morningside neighborhood because of a zoning change, local developers unveiled plans for two malls in the downtown area in the mid-1970s.

One of them was a three-story mall at 4th and Nebraska streets that would be anchored by Brandeis, a now-defunct department store chain from Omaha. However, the city council began supporting the developer's proposal after a new council was elected in 1977, and construction of Southern Hills Mall began after that. Both of the proposed downtown malls were canceled, and the excavated site of Brandeis' mall would colloquially be known as "Lake Brandeis" before the 10-story Terra Plaza office tower was completed on that site in 1983. Sioux City Journal writer Marcia Poole referred to this controversy as the "Great Sioux City Shopping Center Battle" in a 2003 book. A carousel was installed in 1990.

The $21 million Southern Hills Mall opened March 5, 1980. It was originally anchored by Target and Sears, with Younkers opening later. The mall would benefit from increased traffic from the nearby Sergeant Floyd Memorial Bridge after the Siouxland Veterans Memorial Bridge was forced to close during most of 1982 due to structural defects.

On February 25, 1991, Red Lobster opened in the mall's surrounding area.

General Growth managed the mall until The Macerich Company took over the management duties in March 1998 and the mall was owned by a joint venture of Macerich and Simon Property Group. In January 2012, the mall became completely owned and managed by Simon.

J.C. Penney moved from downtown Sioux City to Target's anchor space in mid-2004, one year after Target moved to a free-standing Target Greatland store. Scheels All Sports and Barnes & Noble opened in 2003 and 2004 respectively.

In 2003, the National Park Service named Southern Hills Mall a national trail site after the mall commissioned 38 paintings that commemorate the Lewis and Clark Expedition's 200th anniversary.

In 2018, Younkers closed its store at the mall. The former Younkers anchor space was eventually subdivided into an Ashley HomeStore on the upper level and a Furniture Mart store opened on the lower level. Both stores opened in the early 2020s.

On December 28, 2018, it was announced that Sears would be closing as part of a plan to close 80 stores nationwide. The store closed in March 2019. A new Tilt Studio location is opened up in the former Sears anchor space in 2022.
