= Sergeant Floyd Monument =

Monument in Sioux City, Iowa, US

- U.S. National Register of Historic Places
- U.S. National Historic Landmark
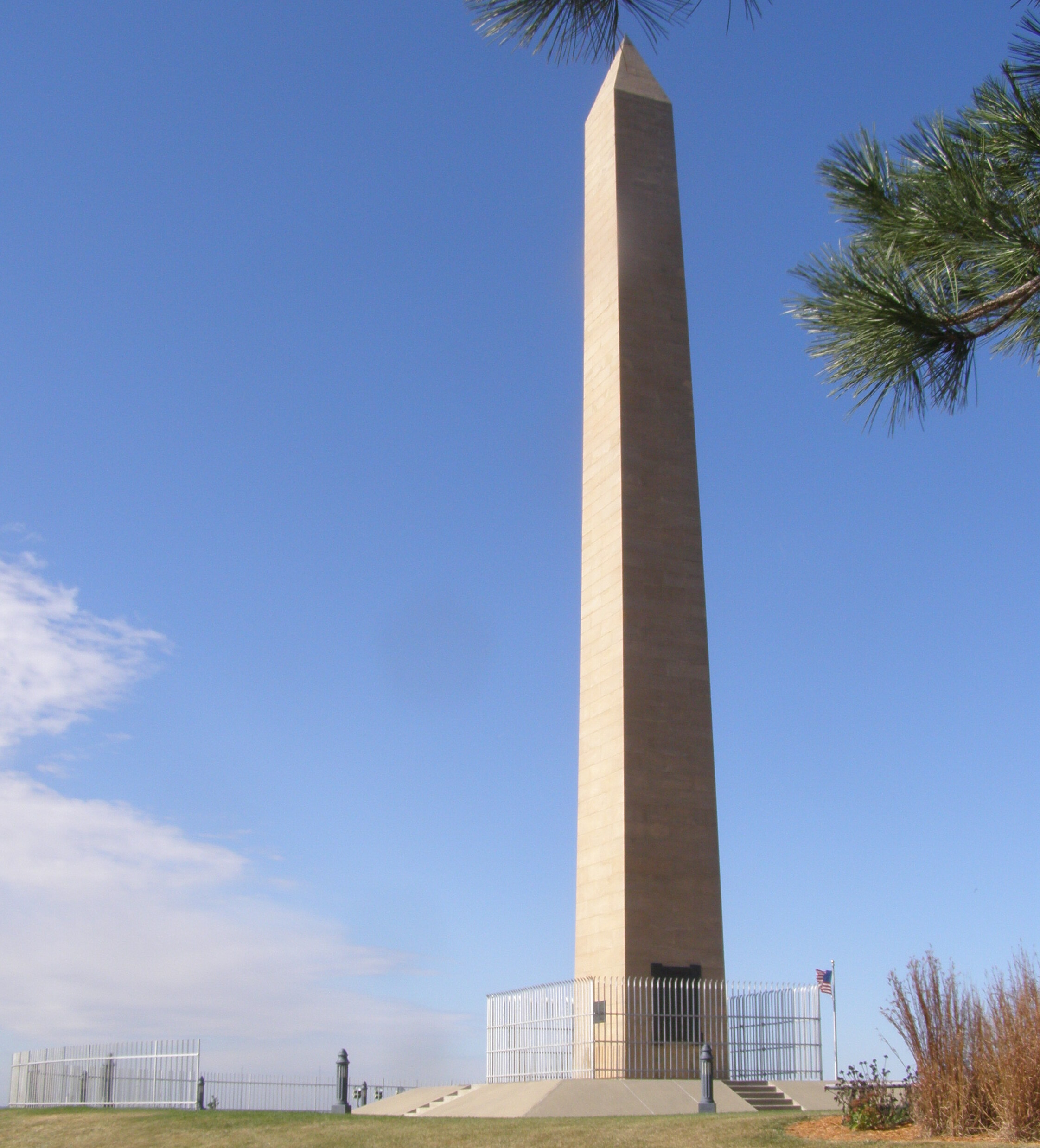
- Sergeant Floyd Monument, Sioux City, Iowa

- Location within Iowa Location within the United States
- Location: S. Lewis Blvd. Sioux City, Iowa
- Coordinates: 42°27′45.25″N 96°22′39.08″W
- Built: Original Memorial: 1804 Current Memorial: 1901
- Architect: Floyd Memorial Association of Sioux City
- Architectural style: Obelisk
- NRHP reference No.: 66000340

Significant dates
- Added to NRHP: October 15, 1966
- Designated NHL: June 30, 1960

The Sergeant Floyd Monument is a monument on the Missouri River at Floyd's Bluff in Sioux City, Iowa, US. The monument honors Charles Floyd, a member of the Lewis and Clark Expedition, who died on the upstream voyage in 1804 and was buried here.

The monument is the first designated National Historic Landmark of the United States.

== History ==
Charles Floyd (1782–1804) was an American explorer, a non-commissioned officer and quartermaster in the Lewis and Clark Expedition. A native of Kentucky, he was a relative of William Clark. He was one of the first men to join the expedition.

While exploring the Louisiana Purchase with Lewis and Clark, Floyd took ill at the end of July 1804. On July 31, Floyd wrote in his diary, "I am very sick and has been for sometime but have recovered my health again." However, this apparent recovery was soon followed by a severe turn for the worse. William Clark described his colleague's death as one "with a great deal of composure", and said that before Floyd died, he told Clark: "I am going away. I want you to write me a letter." The sergeant died on August 20. The expedition held a funeral and buried Floyd on a bluff overlooking the Missouri River; they named it Floyd's Bluff in his honor.

Clark diagnosed Floyd's illness as bilious colic, though modern doctors and historians agree Floyd's death was more likely to have been caused by a ruptured appendix. The brief "recovery" Floyd described may have represented the temporary relief afforded by the bursting of the organ, which would have been followed by a fatal peritonitis. In those days, appendicitis was almost invariably fatal; while appendectomies had been performed as early as 1735, they were extremely hazardous and agonizing, and unfamiliar to most doctors of the era.

By 1857, erosion had caused much of Floyd's grave—even the original cedar post marker left by the crew of the expedition—to slide into the river and wash away. Concerned citizens rescued most of his skeleton, including his skull, and re-buried it 200 meters east of the original burial site. A forensic reconstruction of Sgt. Floyd's probable facial appearance based on a plaster cast of his skull is on display at the Sergeant Floyd Riverboat Museum in Sioux City.

After Floyd's expedition journal was published in 1894, new interest was taken in him and his remains were buried again on August 20, 1895, the anniversary of his death. Sioux City residents Thomas J. Stone, John H. Charles, George D. Perkins, C. R. Marks, and G. W. Wakefield established the Floyd Association to erect a monument. It took five years to raise $20,000 and development began in May 1900 with the pouring of a concrete base. Floyd's remains were reinterred for the final time on August 20, 1900, the anniversary of his death. The obelisk of white sandstone standing 100 feet (30 m) high was completed on May 30, 1901. In 1960, the monument was recognized by the U.S. Department of Interior as the first National Historic Landmark. It was designated a National Historic Landmark on June 30, 1960.

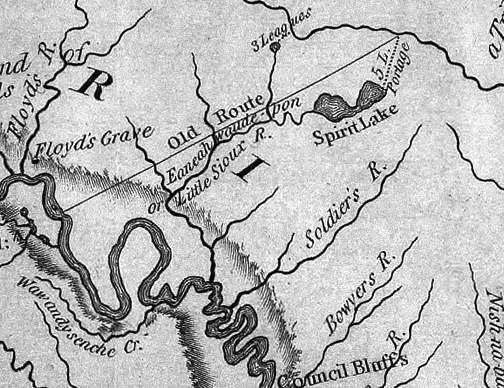
This excerpt from the Lewis and Clark map of 1814 shows the rivers of western Iowa. Floyd's Grave is noted at the left of the map.

The Floyd Monument is now within a 23-acre (93,000 m^{2}) park that overlooks the Missouri River valley. Floyd's final resting place is located on old U.S. Highway 75, in the southern part of Sioux City.

== See also ==
- List of National Historic Landmarks in Iowa
- National Register of Historic Places listings in Woodbury County, Iowa
- Timeline of the Lewis and Clark Expedition
