= Rose Hill Historic District (Sioux City, Iowa) =

Historic district in Iowa, United States

- U.S. National Register of Historic Places
- U.S. Historic district
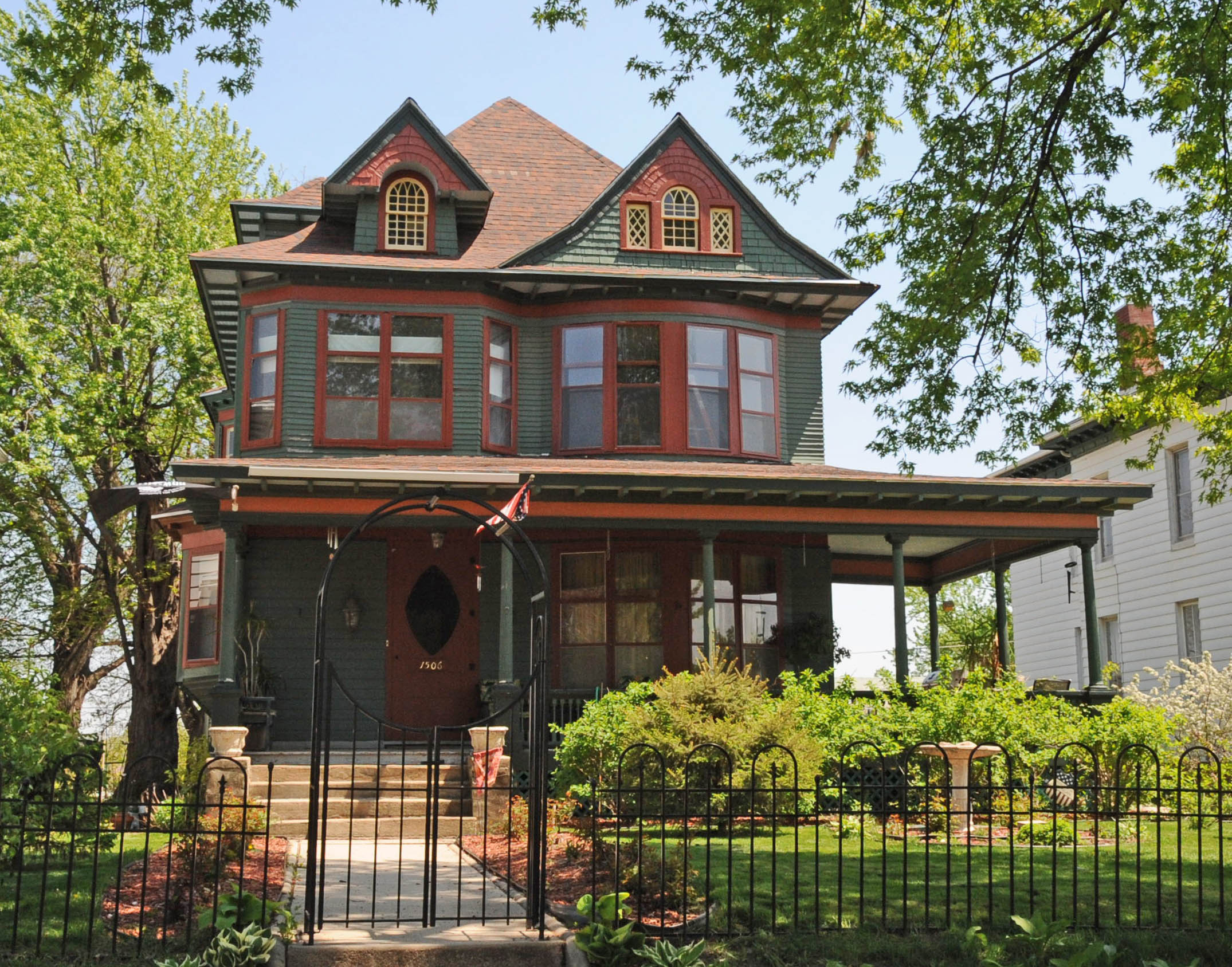
- George Bogue House

- Location within Iowa Location within the United States
- Location: 1400-1700 blocks of Douglas St., Grandview Blvd. and Summit St., Sioux City, Iowa
- Coordinates: 42°30′25″N 96°24′29″W
- Area: 32 acres (13 ha)
- Architect: George G. Baldwin
- Architectural style: Queen Anne; Colonial Revival
- NRHP reference No.: 02001022
- Added to NRHP: September 12, 2002

The Rose Hill Historic District is a nationally recognized historic district located in Sioux City, Iowa, United States. It was listed on the National Register of Historic Places in 2002. At the time of its nomination it contained 217 resources, which included 132 contributing buildings 84 non-contributing buildings, and one non-contributing site. The district is located within the larger Rose Hill Addition, which was laid out by a group of Sioux City entrepreneurs in 1884. It includes many mansions built for the wealthy from about 1890 to 1910, most of which were later divided into apartments. The Elzy G. Burkam House (1894) and adjacent garage are contributing properties. It also included a 125-year-old house at 1529 Grandview Boulevard which was demolished in 2015 after a long controversy about historic preservation.
