= Elzy G. Burkam House =

Historic house in Iowa, United States

- U.S. National Register of Historic Places
- U.S. Historic district – Contributing property
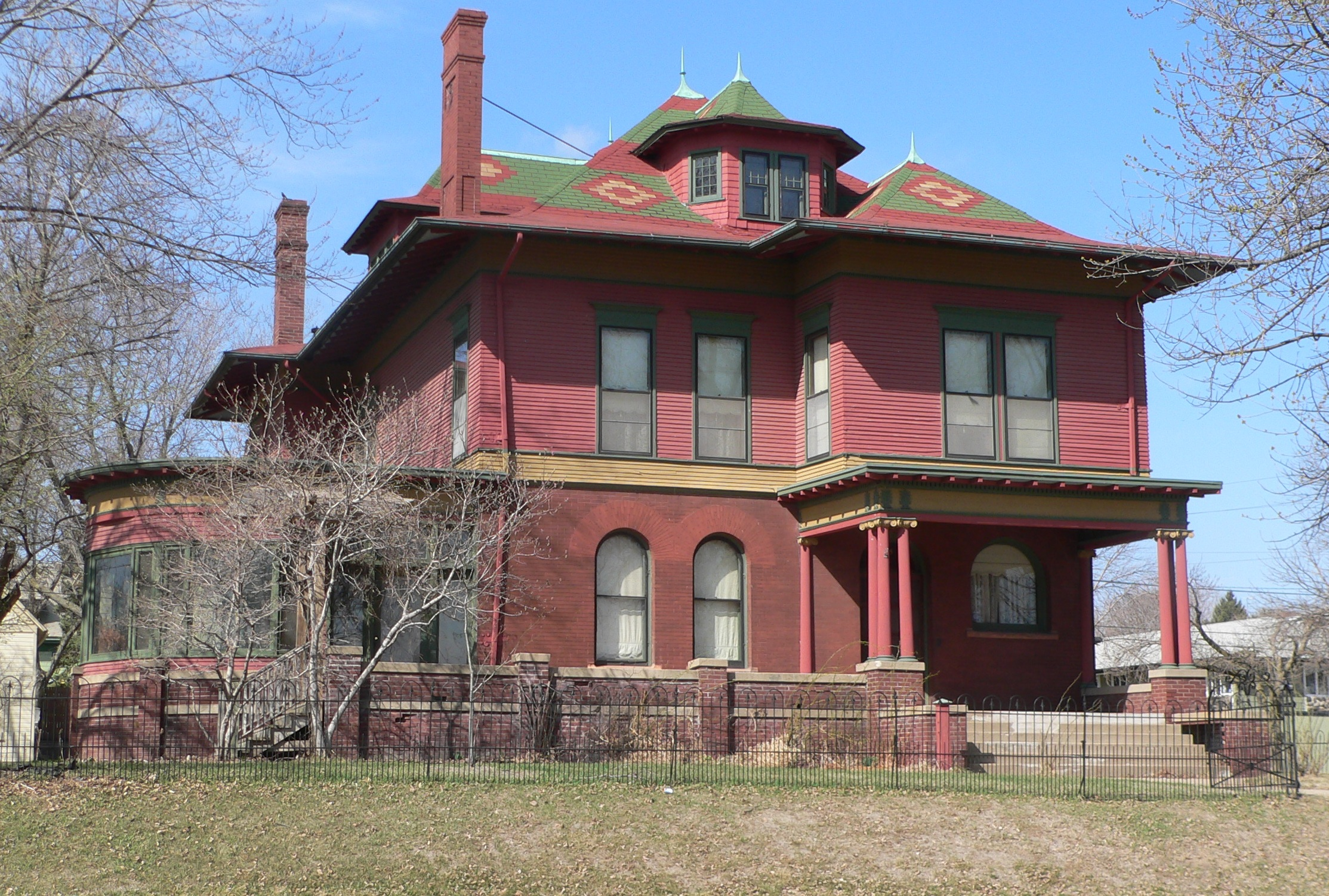

- Location within Iowa Location within the United States
- Location: 1525 Douglas St., Sioux City, Iowa
- Coordinates: 42°30′24.9″N 96°24′25.1″W
- Area: less than one acre
- Built: 1894
- Architect: William D. McLaughlin
- Architectural style: Colonial Revival
- Part of: Rose Hill Historic District (ID02001022)
- NRHP reference No.: 98000864
- Added to NRHP: July 15, 1998

The Elzy G. Burkam House is a historic house located in Sioux City, Iowa, United States. Built in 1894, it is an example of a transitional house between the revival styles popular in the 19th century and the Colonial Revival style that became popular in the early 20th century. The 2½-story brick and frame house was designed by Sioux City architect William D. McLaughlin. Its asymmetrical form was more common in the Colonial Revival style in the 1890s than it was after 1900. The house features round arch windows from the Romanesque Revival style, deep eaves with exposed rafters from the Stick Style, and it is capped with a hip roof with a dormer. The exterior of the first is covered with brick, while the second floor is covered with Clapboard. A conservatory dominates the south elevation.

The house was individually listed on the National Register of Historic Places in 1998,. In 2005 it was included as a contributing property in the Rose Hill Historic District in 2005.
