= Rocklin Manufacturing =

Industrial manufacturing company

- Type: Private
- Industry: Manufacturing
- Founded: 1934
- Founder: I.J. Rocklin
- Headquarters: Sioux City, Iowa, United States
- Area served: Worldwide
- Products: Industrial marking, coating, micro welding, laser cleaning
- Website: rocklinmfg.com

Rocklin Manufacturing is an American manufacturer and distributor of portable industrial equipment headquartered in Sioux City, Iowa. Founded in 1934, the company offers equipment for dot peen and laser marking, electrospark deposition coating, micro welding, and laser cleaning.

== History ==
I.J. Rocklin founded the company in 1934. In 1942, the company moved into the former Albertson & Company facility, built in 1912, in downtown Sioux City.

During World War II, Rocklin produced components for military vehicles—including tank escape hatches and transmission parts—and received an Ordnance Corps flag for its contributions.

From 2016 to 2018, the company's headquarters underwent renovation, including restoration of a 2005 mural depicting WWII-era factory workers on its south wall. The building was listed on the National Register of Historic Places in 2019.

== Recognition ==
In 2023, Rocklin Manufacturing was nominated as an Outstanding Exporter Honoree at the Mid-America Trade Summit.

In 2024, the U.S. Small Business Administration named the company Exporter of the Year for Iowa and the Great Plains Region.
