= Mary Elizabeth Day Nursery =

- U.S. National Register of Historic Places
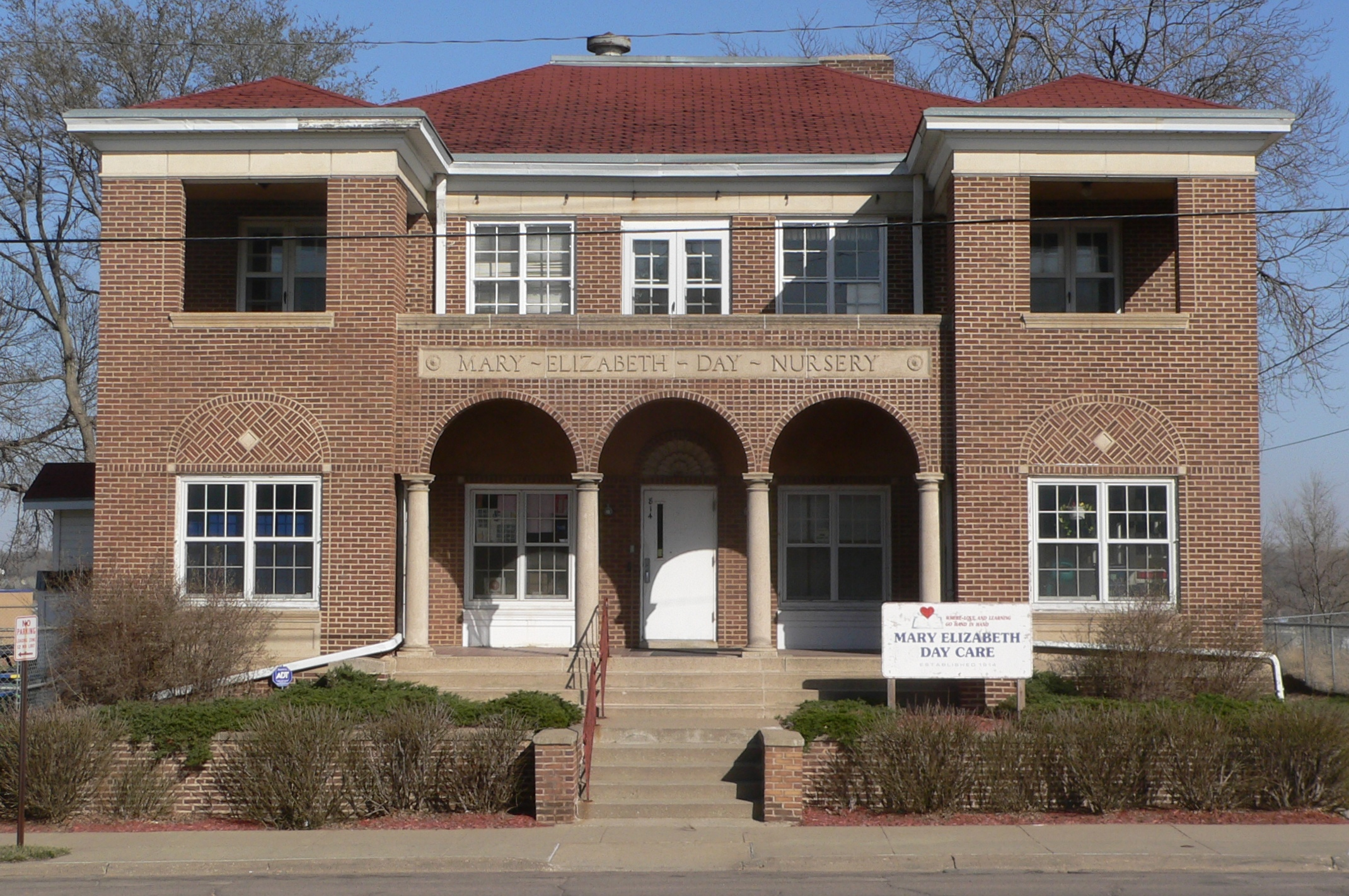

- Location within Iowa Location within the United States
- Location: 814 Court St. Sioux City, Iowa
- Coordinates: 42°29′57.2″N 96°23′46″W
- Area: less than one acre
- Built: 1926
- Built by: The Lytle Company
- Architect: Jurgen A. Raven
- Architectural style: Late Victorian; Renaissance Revival
- NRHP reference No.: 97001293
- Added to NRHP: October 30, 1997

Mary Elizabeth Day Nursery, also known as Mary Elizabeth Day Care Center, is a historic building located in Sioux City, Iowa, United States. This is the oldest child day care facility in the state of Iowa, and the state's second-oldest preschool. The Sioux City Day Nursery was established in 1914 by the Wall Street Mission, a local settlement house operated by the Methodist Episcopal Church. They moved here in 1926, which is the first building designed as a day nursery in Iowa. The two-story brick Renaissance Revival building was designed by local architect Jurgen A. Raven, and built by The Lytle Company, a Sioux City construction firm. Parents were responsible for paying for at least part of their children's care, but it was also subsidized by religious institutions, private associations, and individuals. During the Great Depression, both the federal and state governments began to fund and license child care. The Works Progress Administration was involved in the 1930s. A garage and playhouse designed by Sioux City architect Knute E. Westerlind was built in 1940, and it is part of the historic designation. The facility was renamed the Mary Elizabeth Day Care Center in 1990. The building was listed on the National Register of Historic Places in 1997.
