= Sioux City Public Museum =

History museum in Sioux City, Iowa, United States

- Established: 1960; moved location in 2011
- Location: 607 4th Street, Sioux City, Iowa
- Coordinates: 42.495006°N 96.403043°W
- Type: History
- Website: http://www.siouxcitymuseum.org/

The Sioux City Public Museum is a museum about the history and culture of Sioux City, Iowa. Displays include a video about the city's history, Native American artifacts, pioneer artifacts, historic transportation vehicles, agriculture, industry, geology and fossils.

The Sioux City Public Museum also operates the Sergeant Floyd River Museum & Welcome Center and the Peirce Mansion in Sioux City.

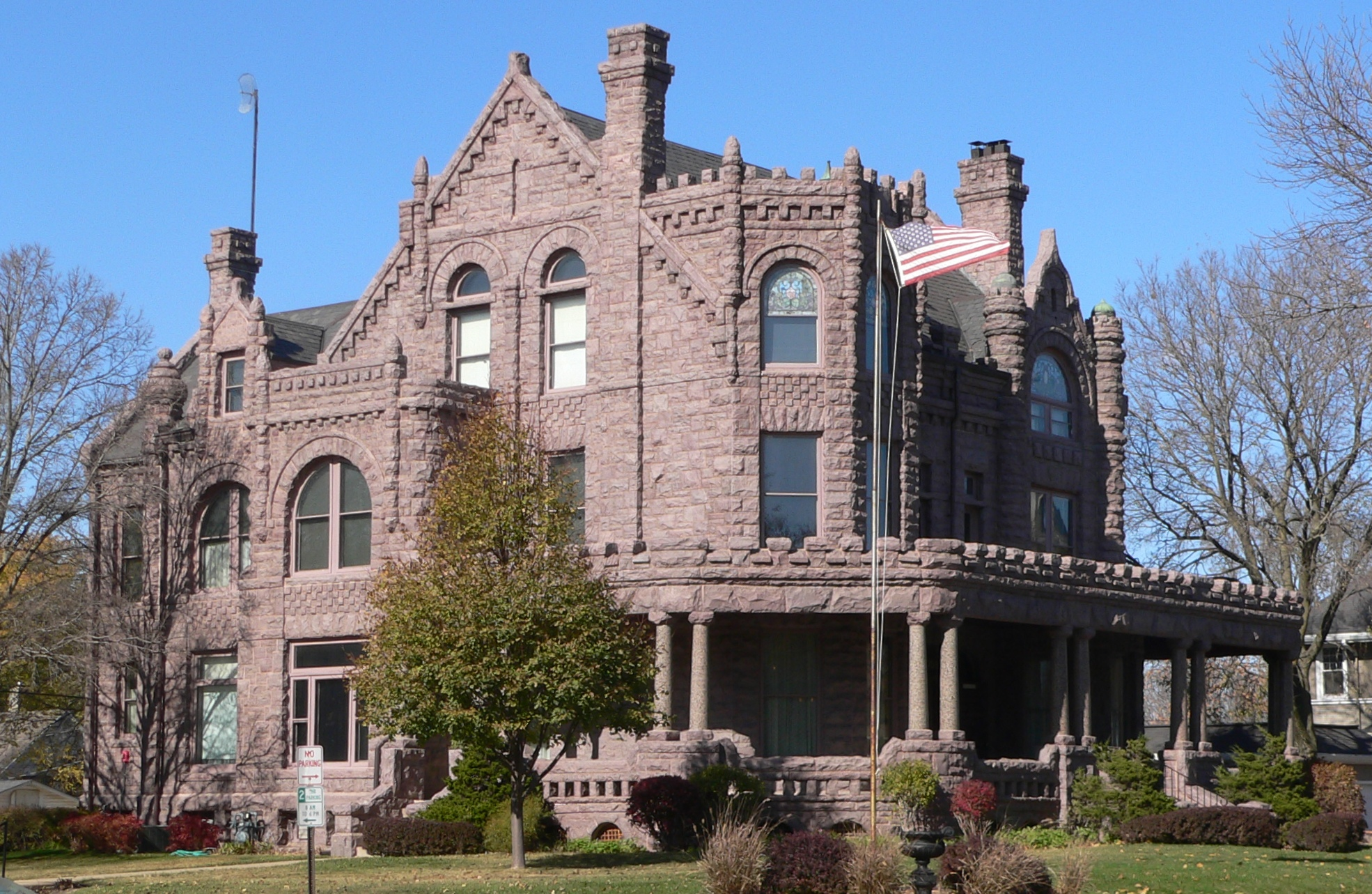
Peirce Mansion from SE

== History ==
From its opening in 1960 until 2011, the museum was located in the 1893 Peirce Mansion at 2901 Jackson Street. First purchased by a group called the Junior League in 1959, the opening of the mansion as a museum was in September 1960.

Exhibits focused on the city's history and there were also exhibits detailing the Lakota people, Omaha people, and Winnebago people. Subjects in the museum included anthropology, archeology, natural history, science, and the military.

There was a robbery of a saddlebag from the museum in 1996 that was part of a string of museum thefts which involved stealing Native American artifacts.

A new location was opened in 2011 in Sioux City's downtown at a former J. C. Penney store which includes a theater, classrooms, and exhibition rooms. The museum project cost $12.5 million. A new exhibit was opened that is all about the song "Sioux City Sue". The museum takes up 10,000 square feet.

The Peirce Mansion is still owned by the Museum. It is open to the public for quarterly open house events and is available for rental.

== Activities and recognition ==
Students from the Sioux City Community School District make models of local landmarks that are judged every year by the museum and the Historical Association.

The museum's deaccession criteria is a six step process that was used as an example in the book Museum administration: an introduction.
