= Atchison A. Ashby House =

Historic house in Iowa, United States

- U.S. National Register of Historic Places
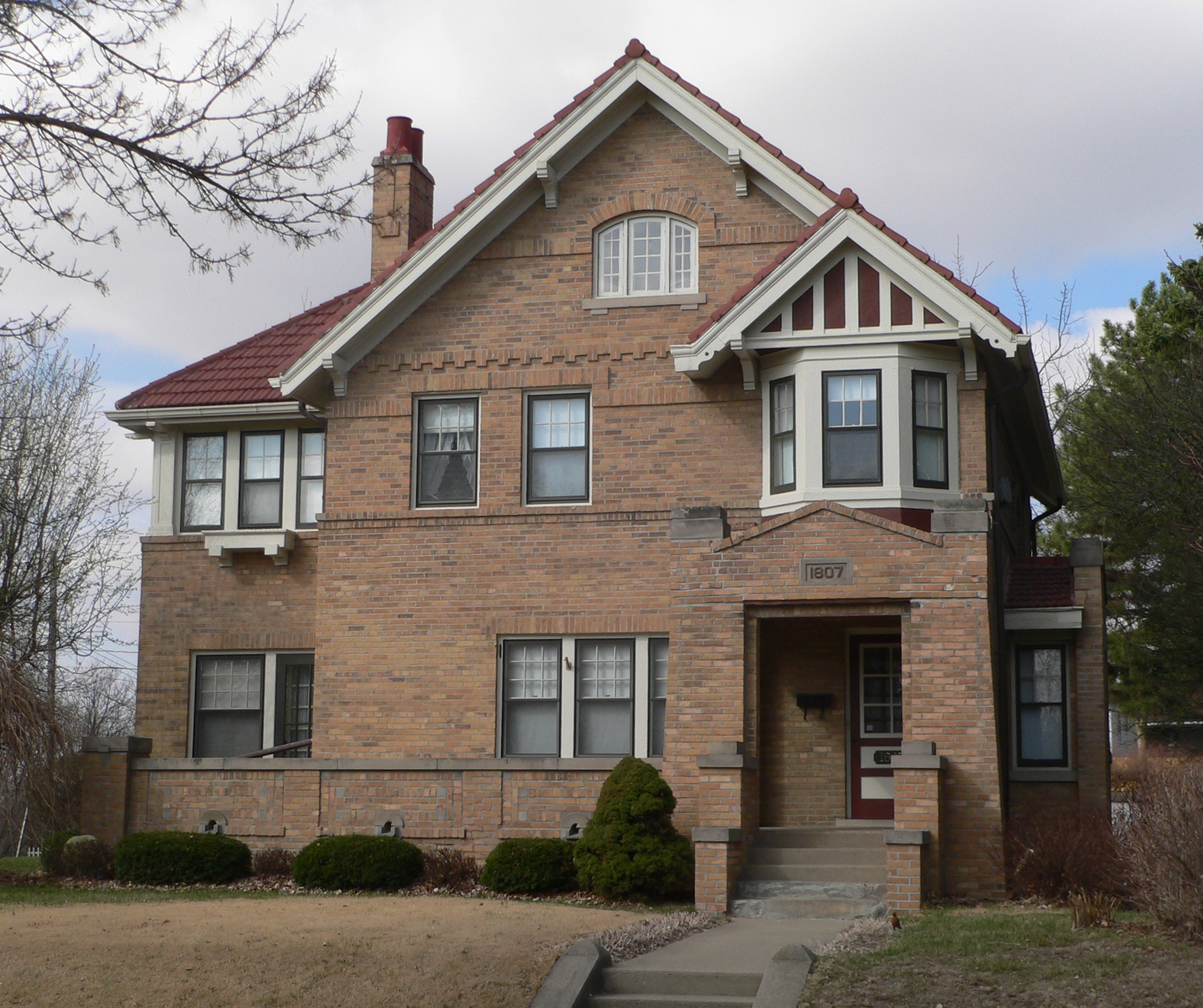

- Location within Iowa Location within the United States
- Location: 1807 Summit St. Sioux City, Iowa
- Coordinates: 42°30′34.1″N 96°24′35.6″W
- Area: less than one acre
- Built: 1916
- Architect: Frederick A. Henniger
- Architectural style: Tudor Revival
- NRHP reference No.: 98001207
- Added to NRHP: September 25, 1998

The Atchison A. Ashby House is a historic building located in Sioux City, Iowa, United States. Ashby was a local physician who had this house built in 1916. The Tudor Revival structure was designed by Omaha architect Frederick A. Henniger. It is possible that he designed four other houses on this same block of Summit Street. The five houses are all two-story brick structures that share a similar block-composition, and are capped with tile roofs. This house features faux half-timbering in some of the gable ends, a tall chimney with chimney pots at the top of the flue, and a red tile roof. The house was listed on the National Register of Historic Places in 1998.
