= Motor Mart Building =

- U.S. National Register of Historic Places
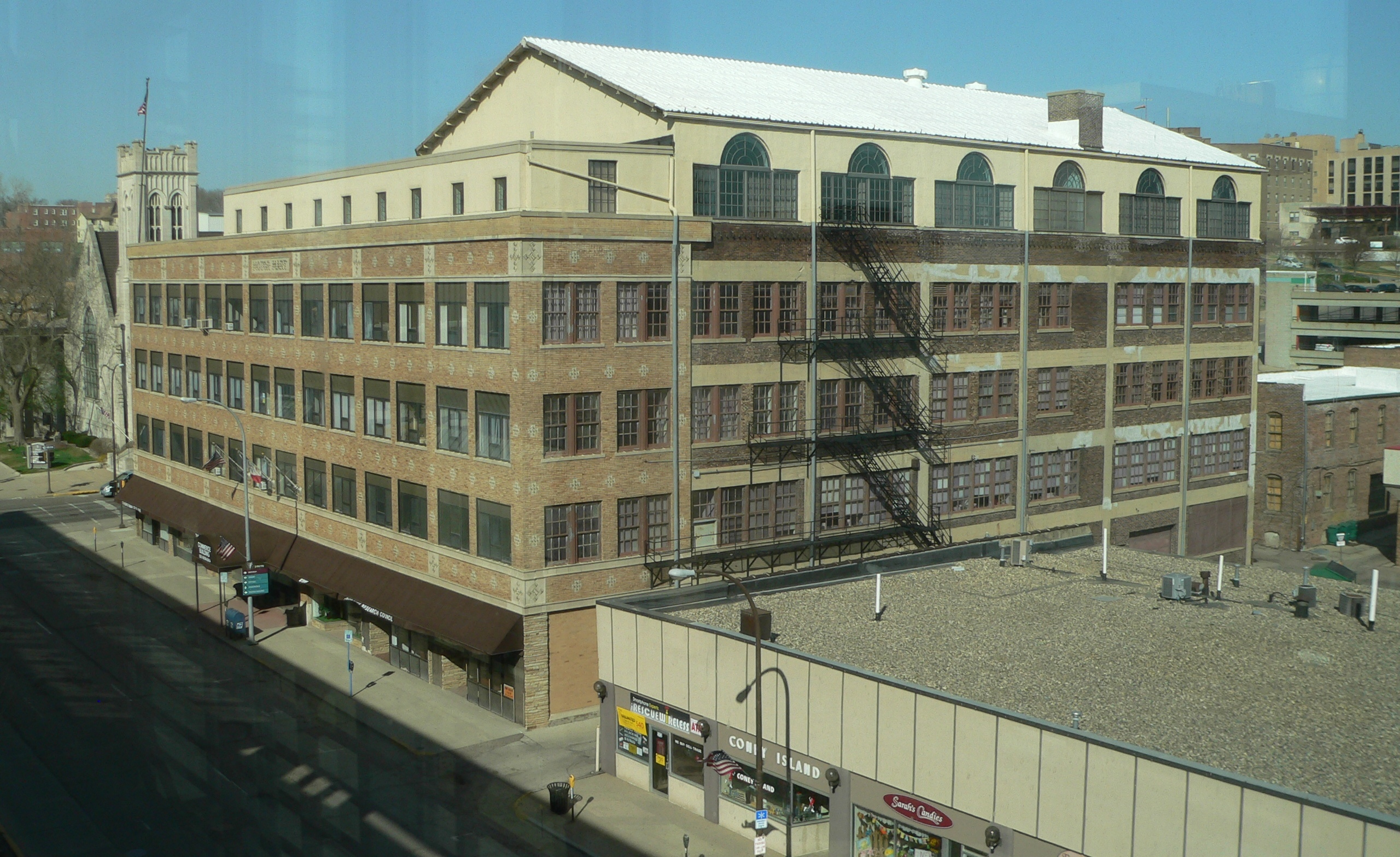

- Location within Iowa Location within the United States
- Location: 520 Nebraska St. Sioux City, Iowa
- Coordinates: 42°29′45.8″N 96°24′11.6″W
- Area: less than one acre
- Built: 1912
- Built by: C.F. Lytle Co.
- Architect: E.J. Henriques
- Architectural style: Early Commercial
- NRHP reference No.: 93000330
- Added to NRHP: April 22, 1993

The Motor Mart Building, also known as the Commerce Building, is a historic building located in Sioux City, Iowa, United States. It was built by Ralph A. Bennett, who was the owner of Bennett Auto Supply Company. The structure was designed in the style of the Chicago school by E.J. Henriques of the C.F. Lytle Company of Sioux City, who also built the structure. It was initially designed to be two stories tall, but the plans were changed and two more floors were added. It was designed to display, repair and provide parking for automobiles. It was also the first building in Sioux City to incorporate the flat slab system of framing of Claude A.P. Turner, and it was one of the first reinforced, poured concrete buildings in the city. The exterior of the concrete frame structure is clad with glazed brick over common brick infill. The building features terra cotta decorative elements.

A.L. Galinsky bought the building in 1919 and converted it into an office building. Its name was changed to the Commerce Building at that time. The Roof Garden was added above the fourth floor from 1921 to 1923. It is a gabled structure covered with stucco. Large Palladian windows line the side walls. The structure housed a ballroom that hosted a variety of social events, and where many big bands played. Lawrence Welk played an early concert here. The building was listed on the National Register of Historic Places in 1993.
