= Sioux City Linseed Oil Works =

- U.S. National Register of Historic Places
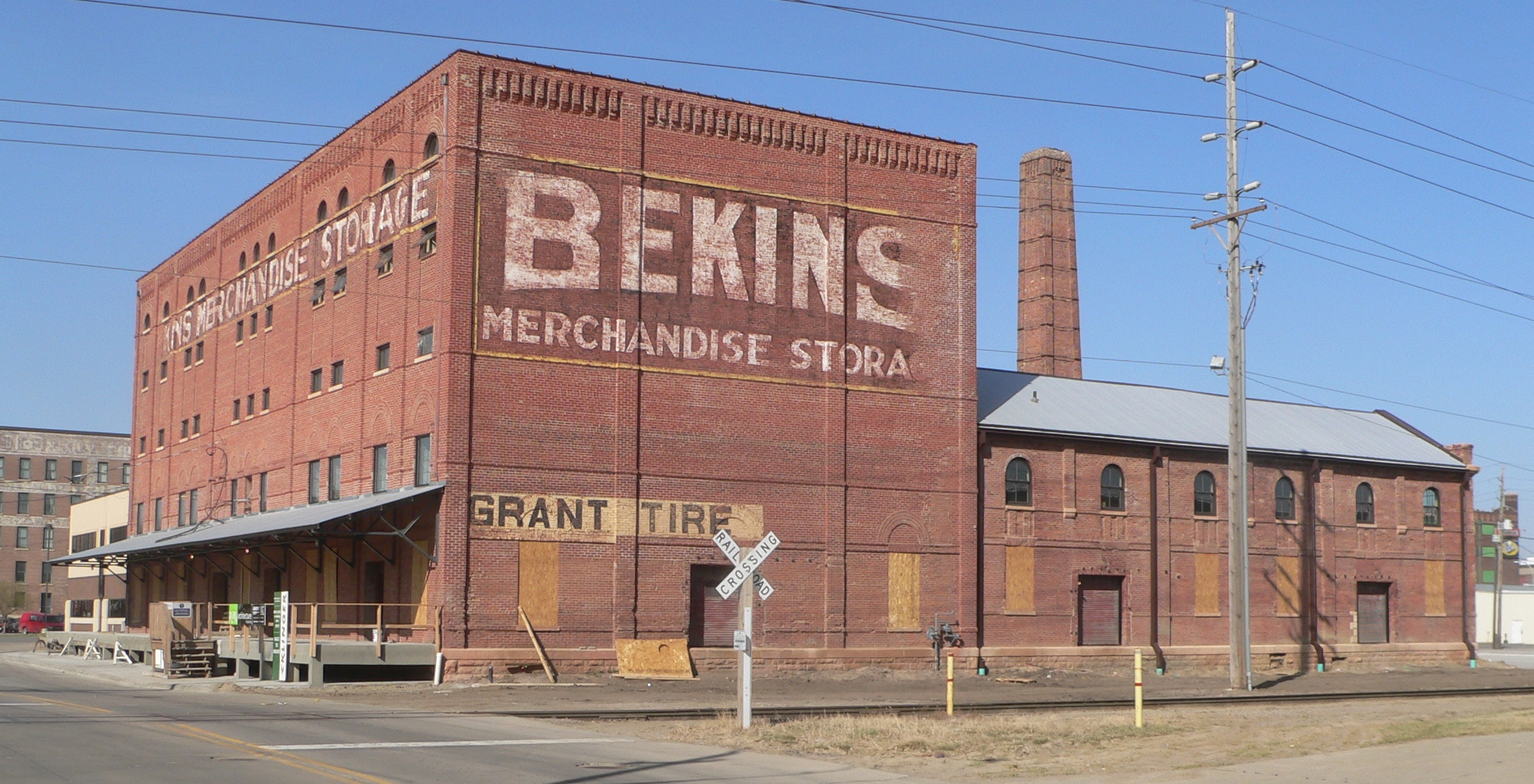

- Location within Iowa Location within the United States
- Location: 210 Court St. Sioux City, Iowa
- Coordinates: 42°29′32.6″N 96°23′45.9″W
- Area: less than one acre
- Built: 1884, 1891
- Built by: Elijah C. Wakefield
- Architect: William D. McLaughlin
- Architectural style: Late Victorian; Late 19th and 20th Century Revivals
- NRHP reference No.: 07001359
- Added to NRHP: January 10, 2008

The Sioux City Linseed Oil Works is a historic building located in Sioux City, Iowa, United States. It is located east of the central business district where warehouses and other industrial buildings are located. It housed the Sioux City Linseed Oil Works (initially known as Hubbard and Gere) from 1884, when it was built, until 1927 when its owner, the American Linseed Oil Company, ceased production here. The building was largely destroyed in a fire that began late in the night of May 20, 1891. Mankato, Minnesota architect William D. McLaughlin stepped in to complete the work begun by Sioux City architect E.W. Loft. The building was rebuilt and was very similar in appearance to the original structure. The gable roof on the westernmost wing was replaced by a flat roof, and two floors were added to the rebuilt press room annex in the back. The building was acquired by Bekins Van and Storage Company in 1928. They began operations here two years later and remained the primary tenant in the building until 1972. There was a variety of other tenants who were housed here over the years. The building was listed on the National Register of Historic Places in 2008.
