= Dr. Van Buren Knott House =

Historic house in Iowa, United States

- U.S. National Register of Historic Places
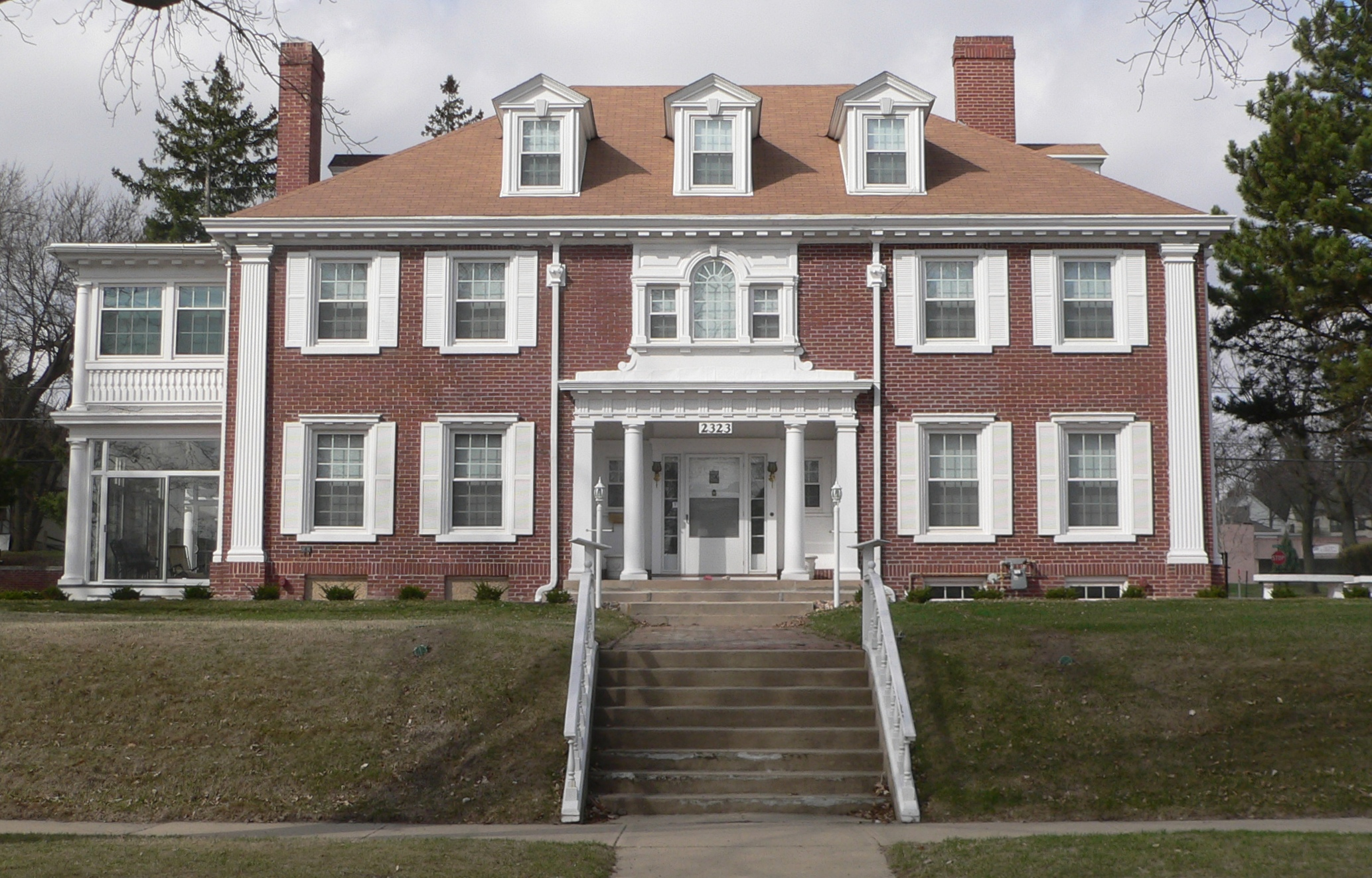

- Location within Iowa Location within the United States
- Location: 2323 Nebraska St. Sioux City, Iowa
- Coordinates: 42°30′53.8″N 96°24′14.8″W
- Area: less than one acre
- Built: 1903
- Architect: Howard Van Doren Shaw
- Architectural style: Colonial Revival
- NRHP reference No.: 99001032
- Added to NRHP: September 8, 1999

The Dr. Van Buren Knott House is a historic building located in Sioux City, Iowa, United States. Knott was a prominent local physician. He had Chicago architect Howard Van Doren Shaw design this Colonial Revival-style house, which is considered an excellent example of the style. The 2½-story brick structure features a symmetrical facade, an entrance porch with Doric columns, a Palladian window above the front entrance, a single-story semi-circular room in the back, and a hip roof with dormers. On the south side of the house is a full-width porch, with a sleeping porch on the second floor. A pergola in the back leads to a detached two-car garage, which was built a couple of years after the house. The house and garage were listed together on the National Register of Historic Places in 1999.
