= Lewis System Armored Car and Detective Service Building =

- U.S. National Register of Historic Places
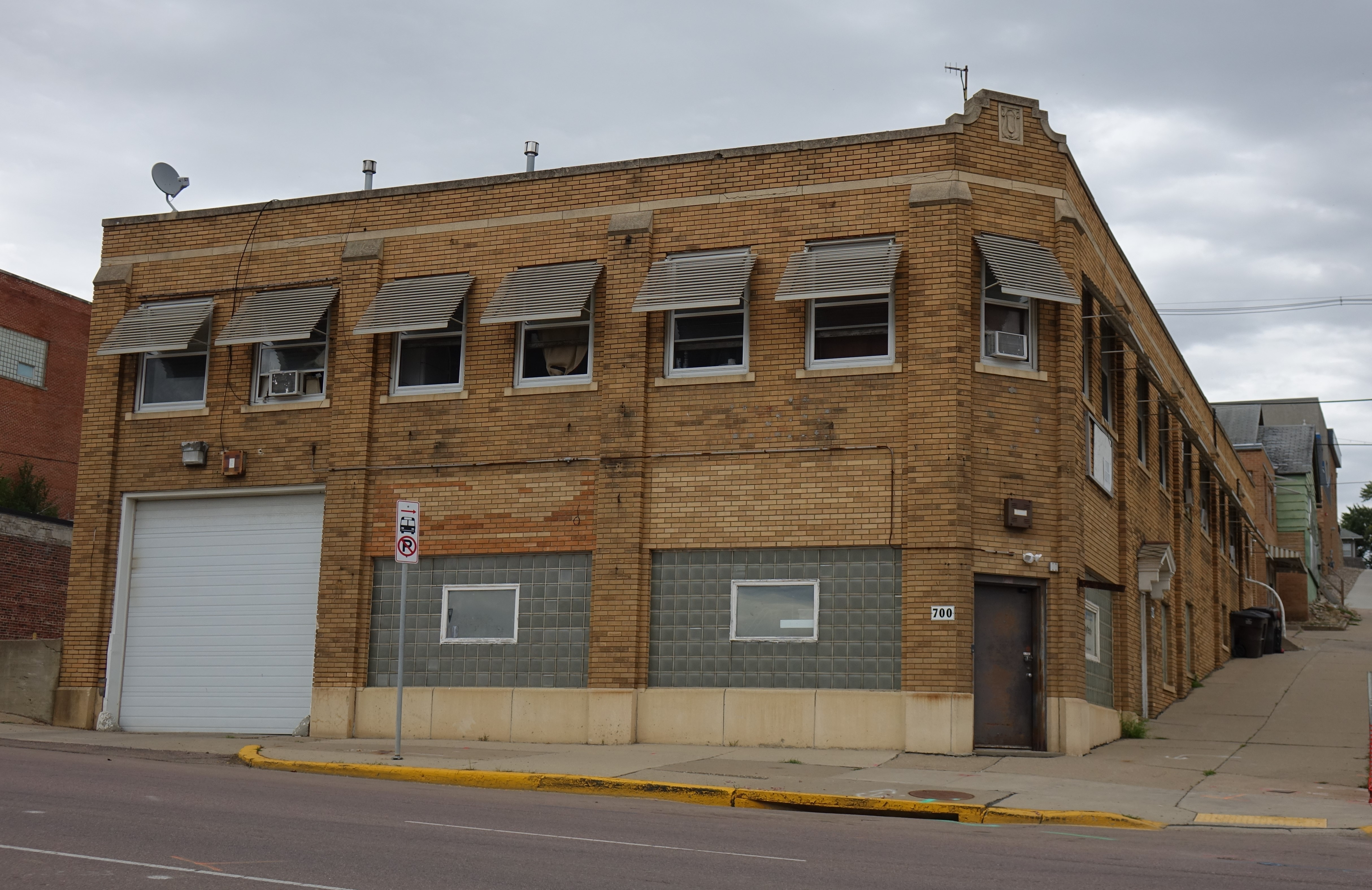

- Location within Iowa Location within the United States
- Location: 700 Nebraska St. Sioux City, Iowa
- Coordinates: 42°29′51.4″N 96°24′11.5″W
- Area: less than one acre
- Built: 1929
- Built by: Federation Construction Company
- Architectural style: Late 19th and Early 20th Century American Movements
- NRHP reference No.: 16000689
- Added to NRHP: October 4, 2016

The Lewis System Armored Car and Detective Service Building, also known as the Bell Tire and Rubber Company (Service Company) and Sioux City Tent and Awning, is a historic building located in Sioux City, Iowa, United States. F.A. Martin and Richard Nash, who owned the property, had this two-story brick commercial building constructed in 1929. KB Construction (Federation Construction Company), who built the building, occupied the second floor. Bell Tire and Rubber Company was the first business located on the first floor from 1930 to 1933. A few other businesses occupied the space until Sioux City Tent and Awning was located here from 1937 to 1941. The following year Lewis System moved in and remained until 1969. The second floor was converted into apartments about 1950.

The Lewis System, Inc. was established in 1919 and incorporated in 1922 by Harry Lewis, who grew up in St. Louis and was in the United States Army before he became a railroad detective and moved to Sioux City. By 1930 the company grew to 111 employees and had offices in Sioux Falls, South Dakota, Omaha, Nebraska, Chicago, and Kansas City, Missouri. A large portion of their business was in retail crime, but they also provided security guards for business firms, security checks, and security alarms. After Harry's brother Paul joined him in the late 1930s they added the armored car division. That division opened offices in Des Moines, Waterloo, Fort Dodge, and Cedar Rapids in Iowa and in Sioux Falls. Harry Lewis served as the company president until his death in 1951, and Paul took over from him and continued until his death in 1957. The company was sold to Samartick and Company of Omaha and they operated the business here until 1969. Wells Fargo Armored Car Service took over the building in 1970 and remained here until 1996. The building was listed on the National Register of Historic Places in 2016.
