= Alhambra Apartments (Sioux City, Iowa) =

- U.S. National Register of Historic Places
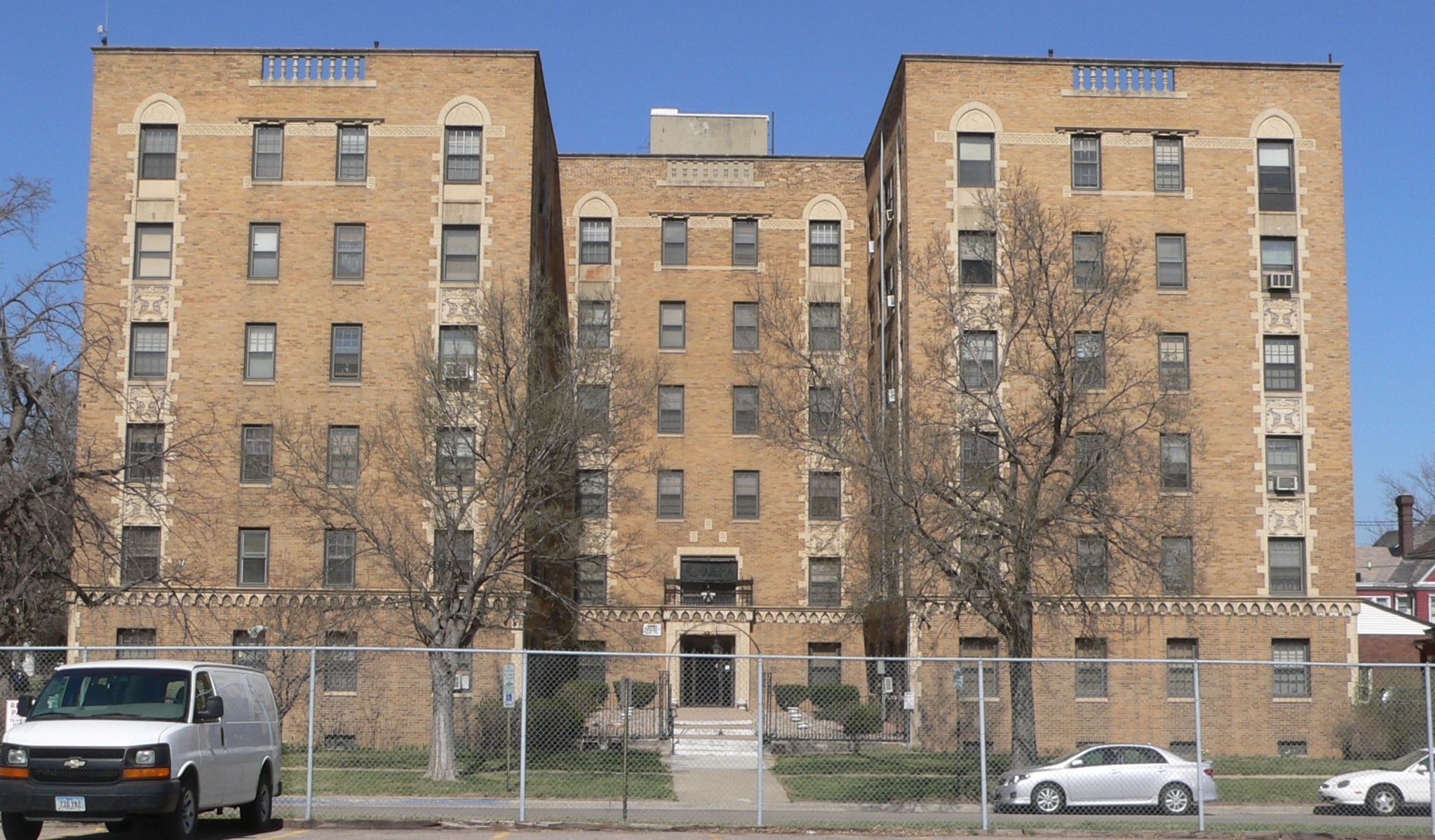

- Location within Iowa Location within the United States
- Location: 801 8th St. Sioux City, Iowa
- Coordinates: 42°29′55.7″N 96°24′01.5″W
- Area: less than one acre
- Built: 1929
- Built by: American Builders Incorporated
- Architectural style: Late 19th and 20th Century Revivals
- NRHP reference No.: 01001089
- Added to NRHP: October 12, 2001

The Alhambra Apartments is a historic building located in Sioux City, Iowa, United States. The city experienced a building boom in 1929, and this building was constructed at that time by American Builders Incorporated of Lincoln, Nebraska. It was one of five apartment buildings built in the city that year, and based on the cost of construction it was the largest. The six-story U-shaped building rests on top of an underground parking garage. The residents could access the garage by way of an elevator. The building is composed of reinforced concrete faced with tan brick and terra cotta trim. Its design is an eclectic mix of architectural styles with Moorish influences. The Alhambra is located in a residential called the Near North-Side, just outside of the central business district. It was listed on the National Register of Historic Places in 2001.
