= Benson Archeological Site (13WD50) =

- U.S. National Register of Historic Places
- Location: Address restricted
- Nearest city: Smithland, Iowa
- NRHP reference No.: 84001611
- Added to NRHP: April 24, 1984

The Benson Archeological Site, designated 13WD50 in the state archaeological inventory, is a historic site located near Smithland, Iowa, United States. Pottery fragments found at the site include Black Sand and Crawford ware from the early Woodland period and Valley ware from the Middle Woodland period. The site was listed on the National Register of Historic Places in 1984.
