= Evans Block (Sioux City, Iowa) =

- U.S. National Register of Historic Places
- U.S. Historic district – Contributing property
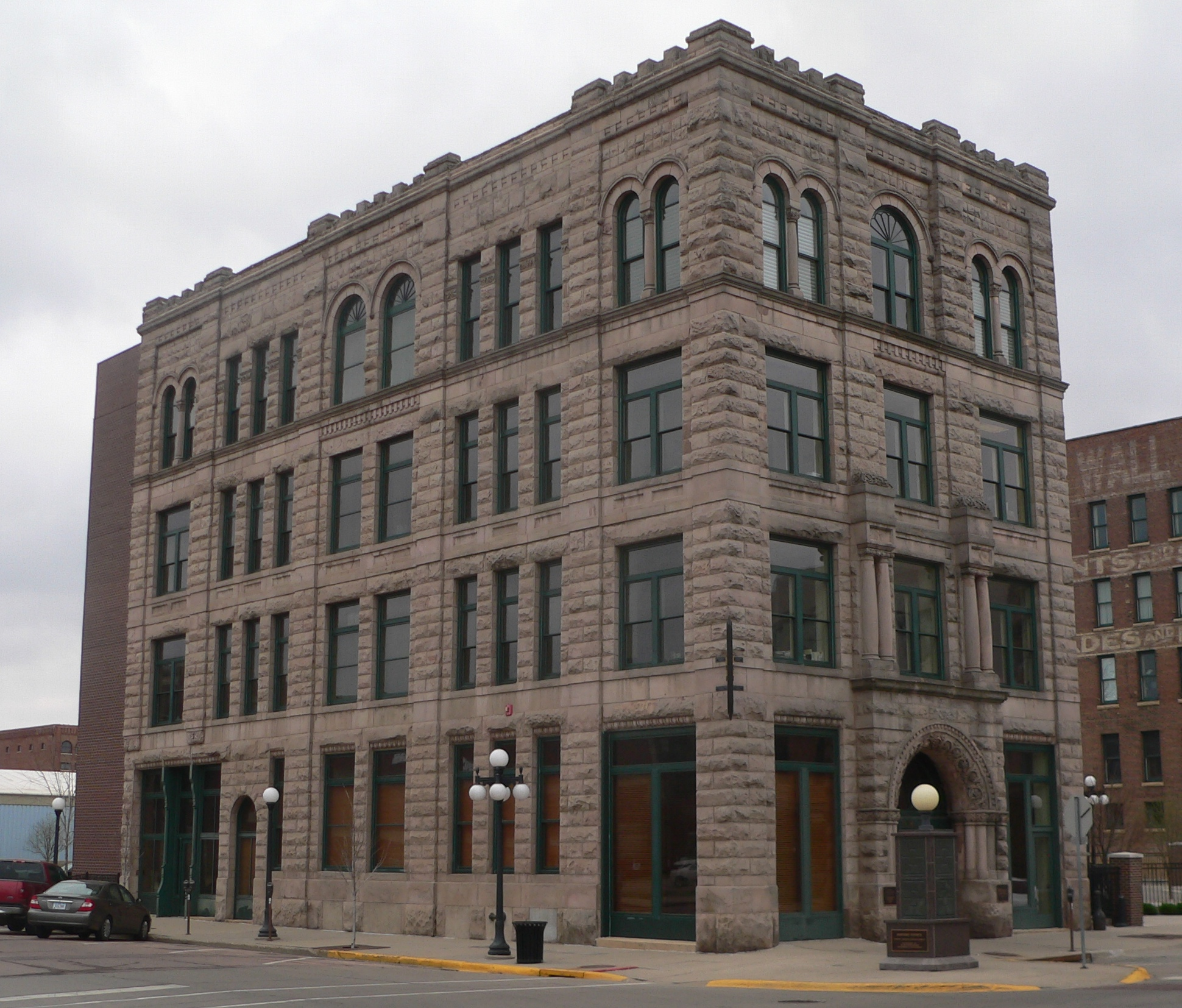

- Location within Iowa Location within the United States
- Location: 1126-28 4th St. Sioux City, Iowa
- Coordinates: 42°29′38.5″N 96°23′42.4″W
- Area: less than one acre
- Built: 1890-1891
- Architect: Charles P. Brown
- Architectural style: Romanesque Revival
- Part of: Fourth Street Historic District (ID95000966)
- NRHP reference No.: 85000011
- Added to NRHP: January 3, 1985

The Evans Block, also known as Northwestern National Bank Building, is a historic building located in Sioux City, Iowa, United States. The city experienced a building boom that began in the late 1880s and continued into the early 1890s. Fred T. Evans, an entrepreneur who had business interests in Iowa, Nebraska and South Dakota, had this building constructed to house Northwestern National Bank of which he was the president. The bank occupied the main level and other offices were housed on the upper floors. Local architect Charles P. Brown designed the four-story Romanesque Revival style building. The Black Hills sandstone for the public facades was from Evans' quarry. The Panic of 1893 brought Sioux City's building boom to an end, and the Evans block was sold in January 1895. Subsequently, the building has housed a hotel, a factory, a saloon, and a variety of stores. It was individually listed on the National Register of Historic Places in 1985, and as a contributing property in the Fourth Street Historic District in 1995.
