= Augustana Lutheran Church (Sioux City, Iowa) =

- Swedish Evangelical Lutheran; Augustana Church
- U.S. National Register of Historic Places
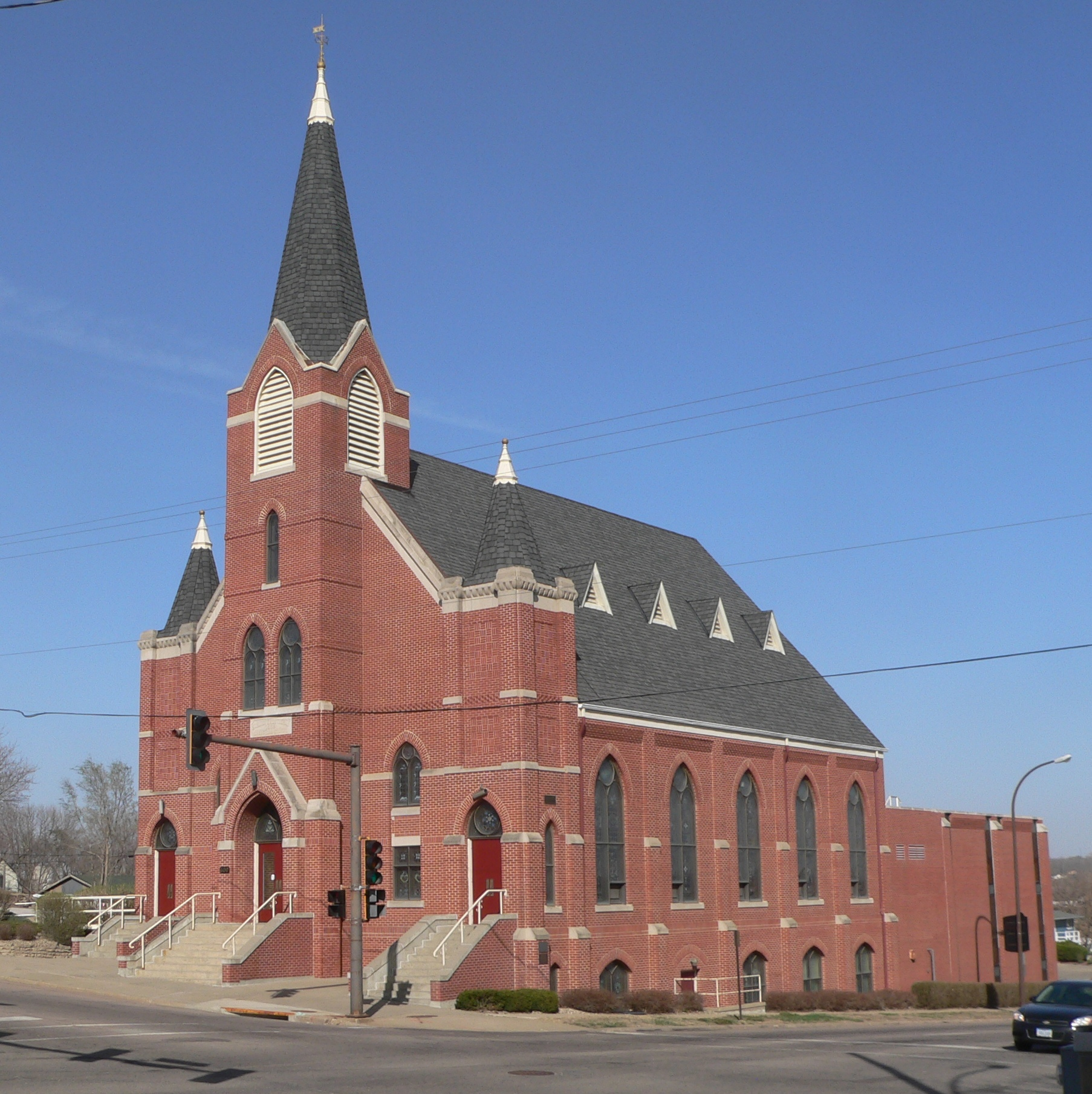
- View from the southwest.

- Location within Iowa Location within the United States
- Location: 600 Court St. Sioux City, Iowa
- Coordinates: 42°29′47.7″N 96°23′45.9″W
- Built: 1890
- Architect: Charles P. Brown
- Architectural style: Late Gothic Revival
- NRHP reference No.: 06000444
- Added to NRHP: May 30, 2006

Augustana Lutheran Church is an Evangelical Lutheran Church in America congregation located in Sioux City, Iowa, United States. The church building was listed on the National Register of Historic Places in 2006 as Swedish Evangelical Lutheran Augustana Church.

== History ==
The first service for the congregation was held in May 1875. They initially met in a rented schoolhouse located at the corner of Third and Virginia Streets. Pastor P.A. Pihlgren and 17 men and women made up the congregation. They met in the rented building until the end of the year when the first church building for the congregation was completed. The Gothic Revival structure was built of wood at the corner of Fifth and Virginia Streets for $1,400. As the congregation continued to grow plans for the present church were begun in March 1887.

The congregation bought two lots on the corner of Sixth and Court Streets for $7,500. The new church was designed in the Gothic Revival style by Sioux City architect Charles P. Brown. Construction was begun in 1889 and was completed early the following year for $35,000. It was dedicated on February 16, 1890. The building was constructed in brick and the three spires were originally covered in decorative wood shingles. The church was incorporated in 1909 as the Swedish Evangelical Lutheran Augustana Church.

Initially a pipe organ filled the apse in the chancel. In 1919 the organ was placed in the back of the church and the “Altar of Peace” was built in the apse. The Gothic styled altar was carved by a German Prisoners of War from World War I. A new pulpit and communion rail were installed at the same time. The focal point of the altar was a painting of the Resurrection. The painting was replaced by a statue of Christ in 1970. The congregation has had four pipe organs in its history. The first was the Moline Organ that placed in the first church in 1882 and was used until 1887 when the Schuelke organ was installed. It was used in the present church until the Bennett organ was installed as a part of the 1919 renovation. The present Moeller organ was installed in 1958.

By 1955, the exterior brick started to crumble due to water seepage. The congregation decided to stay in the old church. It was re-clad in new brick by Sioux City Brick and Tile Company, which did the original work in 1890. In 1959 the church corporation expired per Iowa law, and it was re-incorporated as Augustana Lutheran Church. The two-story brick education building was added to the back of the church in 1977. The church remains significant as Sioux City's last religious structure and congregation Swedish heritage and for its continuous association with its Swedish heritage.

== Architecture ==
The brick Gothic Revival structure features three towers on its main facade. The tall central bell tower rises to a height of 115 feet (35 m), and flanking corner towers are 106 feet (32 m) in height. After the 1955 re-cladding of the exterior the main facade was greatly simplified with the removal of texture, patterning, and the four short pinnacles on the corners of all three towers. The limestone trim was also replaced at that time. A name and date stone is located above the central entryway. The changes gave the exterior a more mid-century interpretation of the Gothic style, whether that was its intention or not. The nave is five bays in length. Each bay is divided with a brick buttress and includes a large pointed-arch window. The steep gabled roof features louvered dormers. A squared apse extends from the back and surrounded by the education building. The education building itself is a Modern Movement style building whose brick matches that of the church.
