= Peirce Mansion =

Historic house in Iowa, United States

- John Peirce Mansion
- U.S. National Register of Historic Places
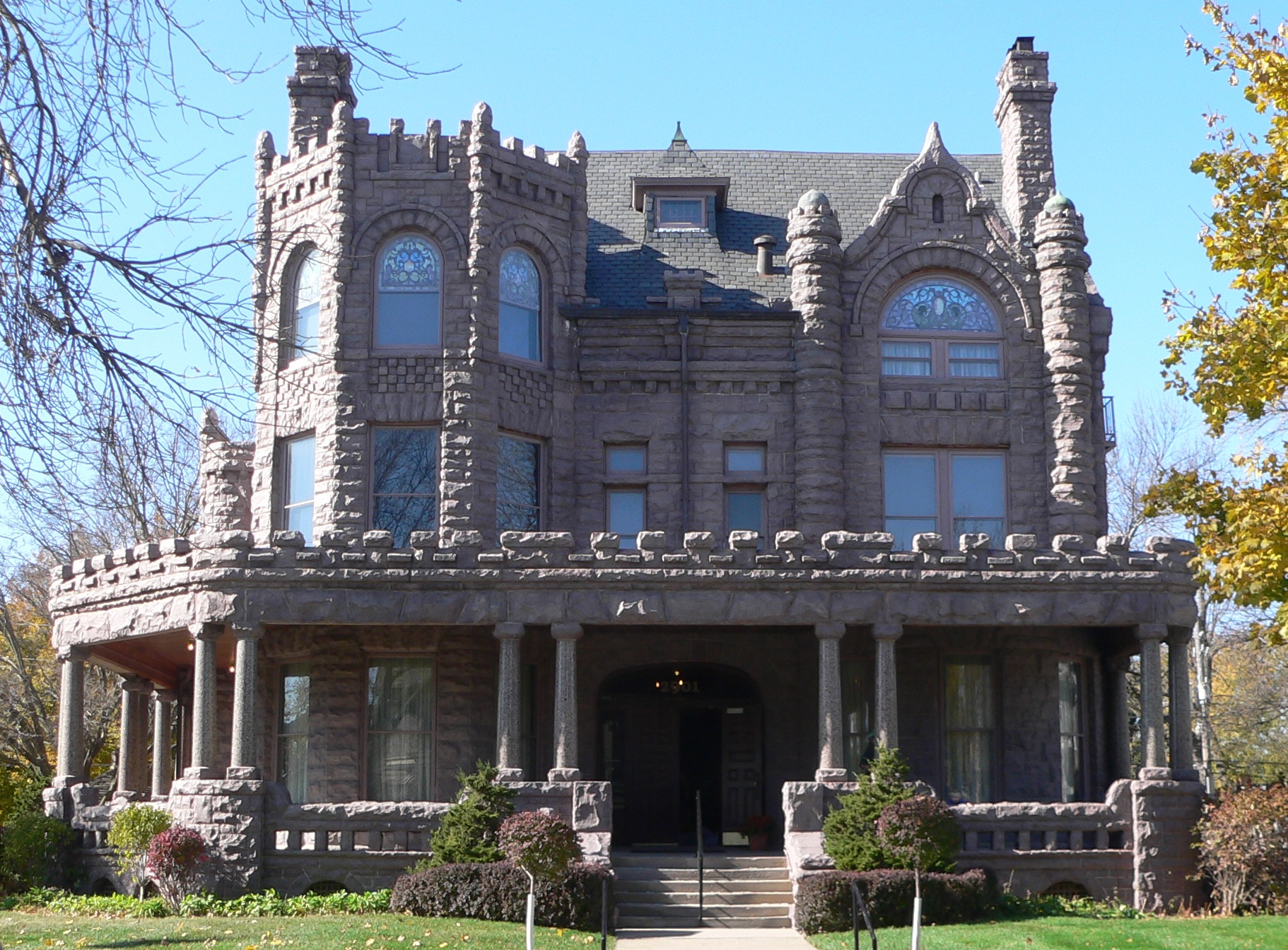
- View from the east

- Location within Iowa Location within the United States
- Location: 2901 Jackson St., Sioux City, Iowa
- Coordinates: 42°31′15″N 96°24′8″W
- Built: 1893
- Built by: Hansen Bros.
- Architectural style: Romanesque Revival
- NRHP reference No.: 78001273
- Added to NRHP: December 12, 1978

The Peirce Mansion is a 23-room mansion located in Sioux City, Iowa. From 1960 until 2011, the mansion was home to the Sioux City Public Museum with exhibits relating to the history of the region. It is still owned by the Sioux City Public Museum and has now been restored to a Victorian-era appearance. It is open to the public for quarterly open house events and is available for rental.

The mansion was listed on the National Register of Historic Places in 1978.

== History ==
The mansion was built for financier John Peirce, who built the Romanesque home out of Sioux Quartzite with 23 rooms in 1893.

First purchased by a group called the Junior League in 1959, the opening of the mansion as a museum was in September 1960. There was a robbery of a saddlebag from the museum in 1996 that was part of a string of museum thefts which involved stealing Native American artifacts.

A new museum location was opened in 2011 in Sioux City's downtown at a former J. C. Penney store.
