= Sergeant Floyd (towboat) =

Museum boat in Sioux City, Iowa, United States

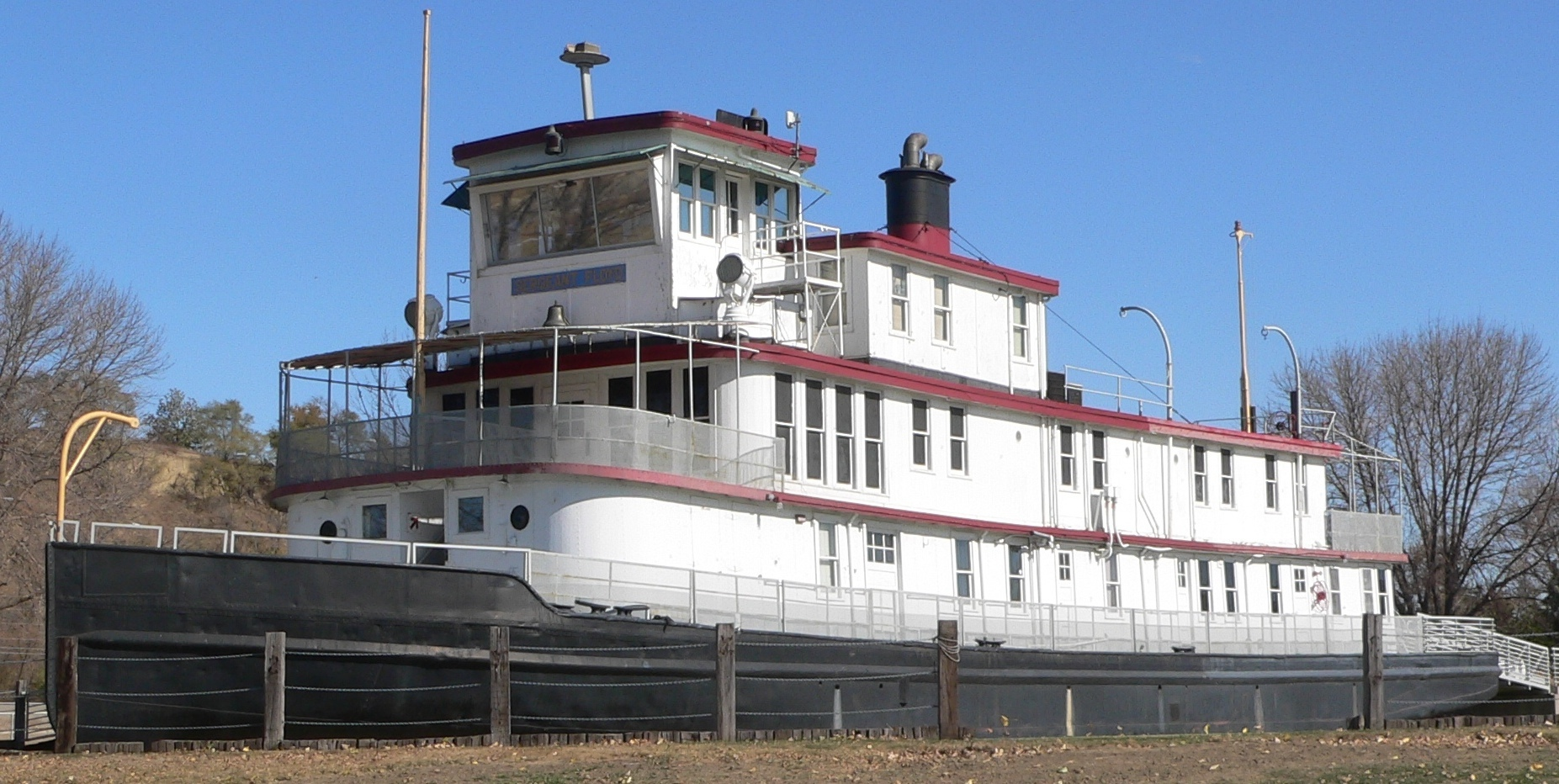

History

United States
- Launched: 1932
- Out of service: 1975
- Refit: 1962-1963
- Status: Museum ship

General characteristics
- Displacement: 306 tons
- Length: 138.4 ft (42.2 m)
- Beam: 30 ft (9.1 m)
- Draft: 3.9 ft (1.2 m) (fully loaded)
- Depth: 5.6 ft (1.7 m)
- Sergeant Floyd
- U.S. National Register of Historic Places
- U.S. National Historic Landmark
- Location within Iowa
- Location: 1000 Larsen Park Rd. Sioux City, Iowa
- Coordinates: 42°29′28.2″N 96°25′07″W
- Built: 1932
- Architect: Howard Shipyards, Inc.
- NRHP reference No.: 89001079

Significant dates
- Added to NRHP: 5 May 1989
- Designated NHL: May 5, 1989

Sergeant Floyd is a historic museum boat, serving as the Sergeant Floyd River Museum & Welcome Center at 1000 Larsen Park Road in Sioux City, Iowa. Built in 1932 as a utility vehicle and towboat, she is one of a small number of surviving vessels built specifically for the United States Army Corps of Engineers in its management of the nation's inland waterways. The boat has been restored and drydocked, and now houses exhibits about the Missouri River and local tourism information. The museum is a facility of the Sioux City Public Museum.

She was declared a National Historic Landmark in 1989.

== Description and history ==
Sergeant Floyd is located in a drydock in Larsen Park, on the waterfront of the Missouri River just north of the Sioux City Marina. She is a steel-hulled craft with a superstructure of wood and steel. She has a total length of 138.4 feet (42.2 m), a beam of 30 feet (9.1 m), and a hold depth of 5.6 feet (1.7 m). When fully loaded, she had a draft of 3.9 feet (1.2 m). Her hull has a sharp prow, and has both longitudinal and transverse bulkheads. She has a hogging frame, which provides additional reinforcement in the event of running aground. The superstructure has three levels, providing crew quarters and the operating spaces of the vessel. In 1937 she underwent alterations to address vibrations in her hull, and in 1962-63 her engines were upgraded.

She was built in 1932 at the Howardville Shipyard in Jeffersonville, Indiana, and was delivered to the United States Army Corps of Engineers (USACE) Kansas City District. Her early service was as a support vehicle, moving men, equipment, and supplies throughout the district, and conducting inspection voyages. She remained in active service until 1975, when Congress authorized her to be remodeled for use as a USACE museum ship. She served in this role first as a traveling exhibit, and then berthed at St. Louis, Missouri until 1982, when she was given to the city of Sioux City, Iowa.

== See also ==
- Baltimore (tug), a similar vessel for the city of Baltimore, also a National Historic Landmark
- List of U.S. National Historic Landmark ships, shipwrecks, and shipyards
- List of National Historic Landmarks in Iowa
- National Register of Historic Places listings in Woodbury County, Iowa
