= Doyle House =

Doyle House may refer to:

- Doyle House (Austin, Texas), formerly listed on the National Register of Historic Places in Travis County, Texas
- Doyle House (Houston, Texas), listed on the National Register of Historic Places in Harris County, Texas

== See also ==
- David Doyle House No. 2, El Paso, Arkansas, listed on the National Register of Historic Places in White County, Arkansas
- Doyle-Benton House, Denver, Colorado, listed on the National Register of Historic Places in Northeast Denver, Colorado
- Harold A. (H.A.) Doyle House, Yankton, South Dakota, listed on the National Register of Historic Places in Yankton County, South Dakota
- John Doyle House, Park City, Utah, listed on the National Register of Historic Places in Summit County, Utah
- Doyle Settlement, Pueblo, Colorado, listed on the National Register of Historic Places in Pueblo County, Colorado
- Doyle Place, Florence, Kansas, listed on the National Register of Historic Places in Marion County, Kansas
- A. E. Doyle Cottage, Nehalem, Oregon
