= Steele, Sandham and Steele =

American architecture firm

Steele, Sandham, and Steele is an Omaha based architecture firm whose work was effective at combining the popular Modern style with Historicism in many churches, federal buildings, and educational facilities located in Omaha, Nebraska and surrounding areas. The firm's most principal architect, William LaBarthe Steele, was a prominent member of the Prairie School and was essential in spreading the style to the Iowa/Nebraska region. Prior to joining this firm, he worked under Louis Sullivan, an important member of the Chicago School. Steele eventually moved to Sioux City, IA where he designed dozens of homes and small churches in the prairie style, four of which are now state or national historical monuments. He started Kimball and Steele in 1928 in Omaha, NE with Thomas R. Kimball.

== Beginnings ==
The firm's name changed as principal architects shifted, but the style is unified by the strong style of Steele Sr, and the large scale buildings the firm completed were essential in bringing the prairie and modernist style to the farthest West of the American Midwest. Josiah D. Sandham joined the firm in 1929, making the firm Kimball, Steele, and Sandham. Following the death of Kimball in 1946, William Steele Jr. joined the firm as a partner making it Steele, Sandham, and Steele.

== Works ==
The first project designed as a firm by Kimball, Steele, and Sandham was the Ivy Hotel and Residence located in Minneapolis, Minnesota in 1930. The church was supposed to be one of four towers at the corners of a new Second Church of Christ Scientist. However, this tower was the only one ever completed. The design mixes the ziggurat form of Art Deco with Mideastern overtones. Its pebbly concrete walls are distinctive.

Their most important work was the Old Federal Building located in Omaha, Nebraska which was built as part of the New Deal Era and is a registered historical monument as of March 2009. It is evident in its design style, stripped classical combined with Art Deco 4, that it reflects the mood of the times it was built in. Its construction, as well as its completion, provided many jobs during these stark economic times. Construction on the building began in 1933 and was completed in that same year. The Omaha World-Herald wrote of the design in 1932:

The old forms of Renaissance and Romanesque architecture, and the French versions of classical forms, so long the invariable custom of government buildings, are left behind for a structure more closely akin to the Redick tower, Union State Bank building, and the Union Station than to the post office or courthouse. The lower three stories will be faced with limestone and granite, the upper stories with brick. Construction will be “fireproof” having a steel frame encased in concrete with reinforced concrete floors. Use of local materials will be encouraged as much as possible.

The building is now home to a Residence Inn as its use as a government building became obsolete.

St Cecilia's Cathedral was also designed by the firm in 1905 by only Thomas R. Kimball which explains the discrepancy in style from both previous and future work. It is of Roman Catholic and Spanish Renaissance influence. Construction was completed by Kimball, Steele, and Sandham over 30 years later in 1938.

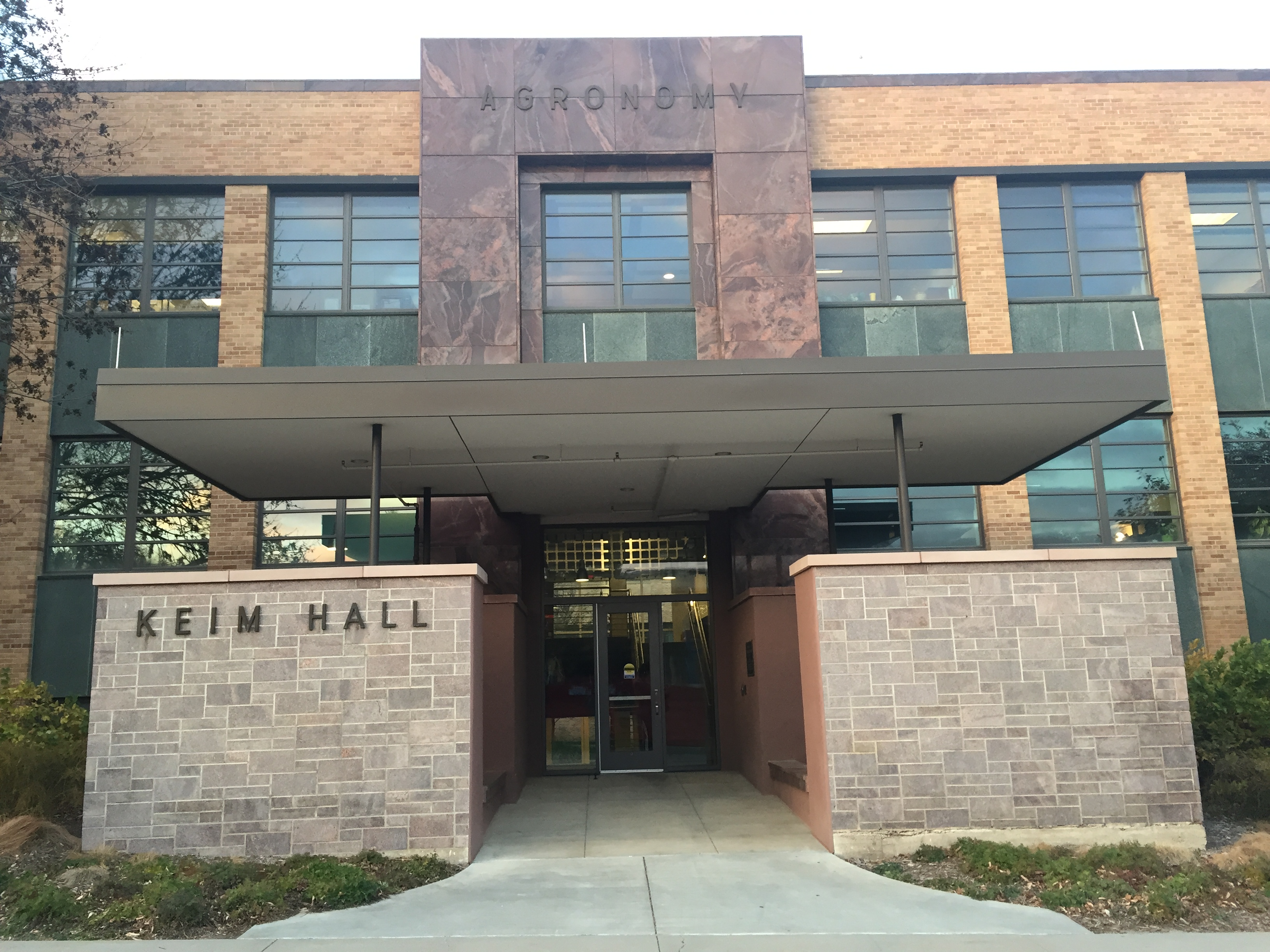
Keim Hall

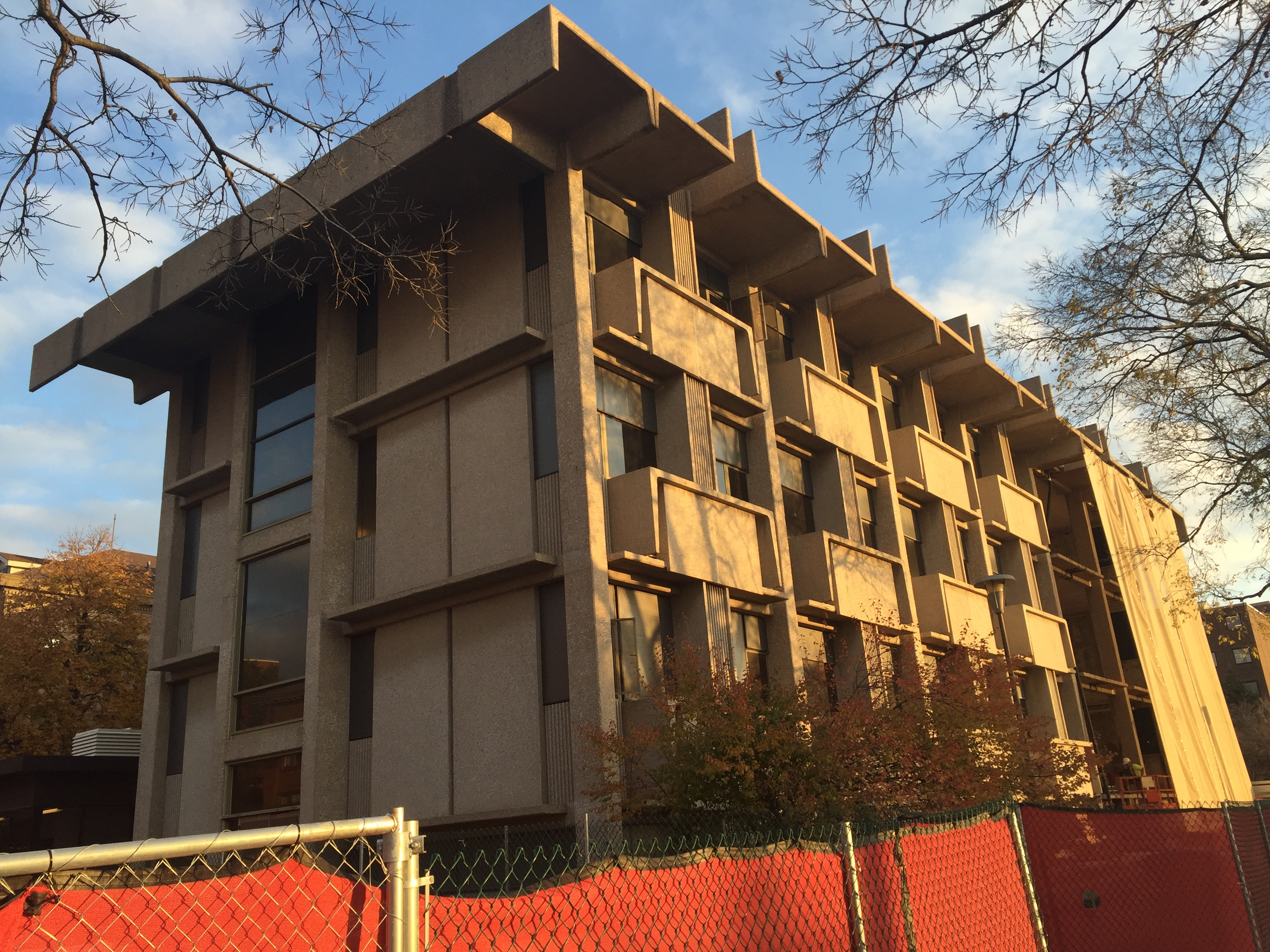
Behlen Laboratory

The firm designed several buildings for the University of Nebraska, Lincoln following WWII. In 1949, the Agronomy Building was to be redesigned. The then-head of the Department of Architecture, Linus Burr Smith drew up original plans and stated that only four firms in Nebraska were capable of completing the design. Steele, Sandham, and Steele were chosen. The Agronomy Building was considered to be sophisticated and elegant at the time it was constructed, with state-of-the-art laboratories and modern amenities. The building was renamed for a long time department chair, Franklin D Keim, in 1957 who had retired in 1952 after the building's completion. The firm was renamed Steele, Sandham, and Weinstein following the death of William Steele Sr. and the partnering of Alex Weinstein. They designed Behlen Laboratory under this name in 1962. Behlen Laboratory was one of the few brutalist buildings built in Nebraska.

== Stylistic designation ==
The style of Steele, Sandham, and Steele evolved over the years as societal moods changed and partners came and went. At its inception, the firm was heavily influenced by historic styles such as Renaissance style and Art Deco as is seen in St. Cecilia's Cathedral and The Ivy Tower Hotel and Residence. Their largest project, the Old Federal Building, located in Omaha, Nebraska, exhibits a bridge between these historic styles and the brutalist style that their later work was done in, as is seen in its use of both historic materials such as granite and limestone and modern materials of steel and reinforced concrete. Their brutalist style was fully realized in the 1950s and 1960s in their design of campus buildings for the University of Nebraska, Lincoln and is especially present in the exposed concrete construction and fortress-like structure of Behlen Laboratory.
