= St. Thomas Orthodox Church (Sioux City, Iowa) =

Russian Orthodox Church Outside of Russiaparish in Sioux City, Iowa

- St. Thomas Orthodox Church (ROCOR)
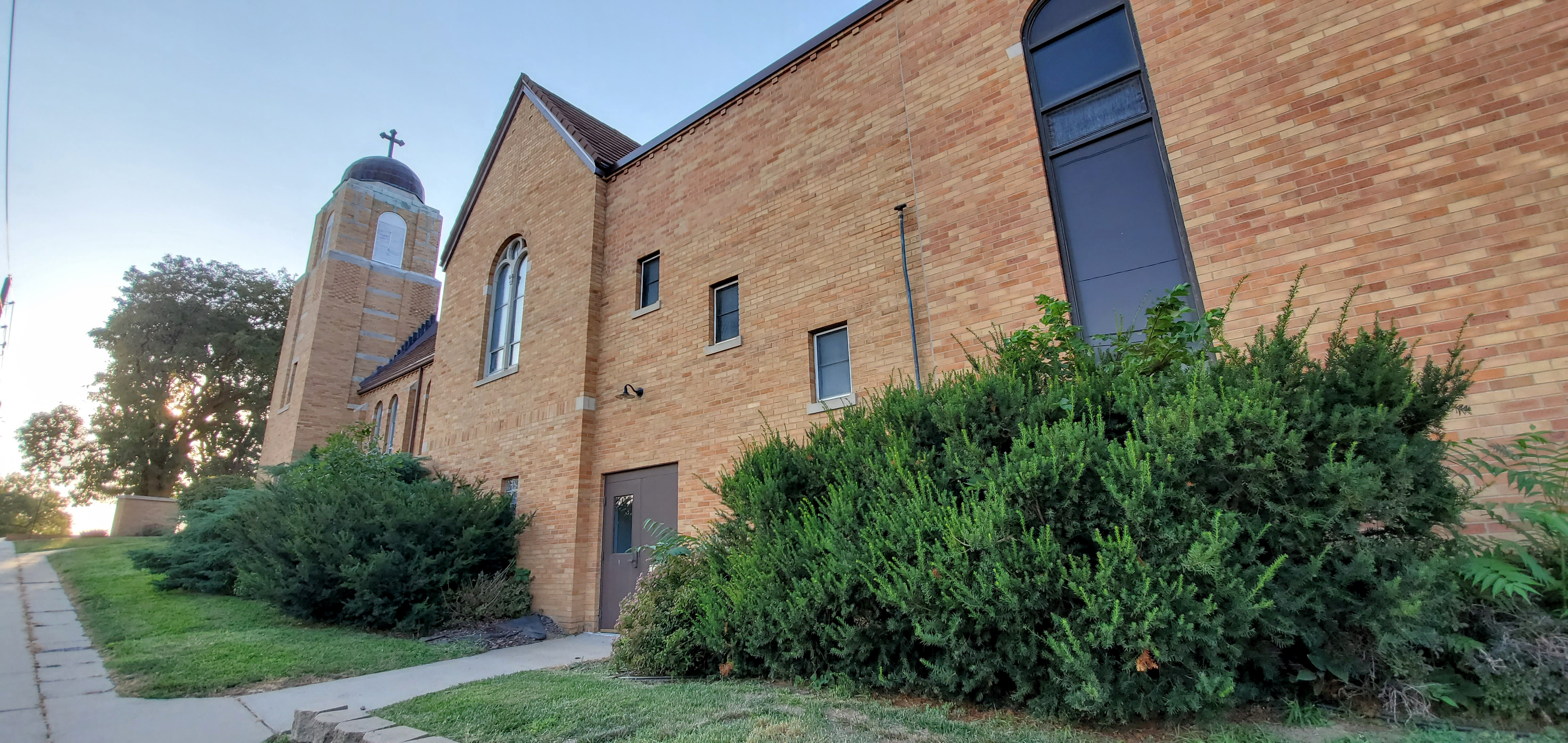
- View from the southeast
- St. Thomas Orthodox Church
- 42.5021°N 96.4007°W
- Location: 1100 Jones St; Sioux City, Iowa
- Country: United States
- Language: English
- Denomination: Eastern Orthodox
- Website: stthomassiouxcity.org

History
- Status: Parish church
- Founded: 1916
- Founder: Syrian Orthodox Benevolent Society
- Dedication: Thomas the Apostle

Architecture
- Functional status: Active
- Years built: 1949–1952
- Groundbreaking: 1949-10-23
- Completed: 1952-10-05

Specifications
- Capacity: 225
- Length: 35 metres (115 ft)
- Width: 18 metres (60 ft)

Administration
- Province: Moscow Patriarchate
- Archdiocese: Russian Orthodox Church Outside of Russia (ROCOR)
- Diocese: Diocese of Chicago and Mid-America
- Deanery: Chicago and Mid-America

Clergy
- Archbishop: currently awaiting election of new bishop
- Rector: The Rev. Fr. Kevin Kirwin
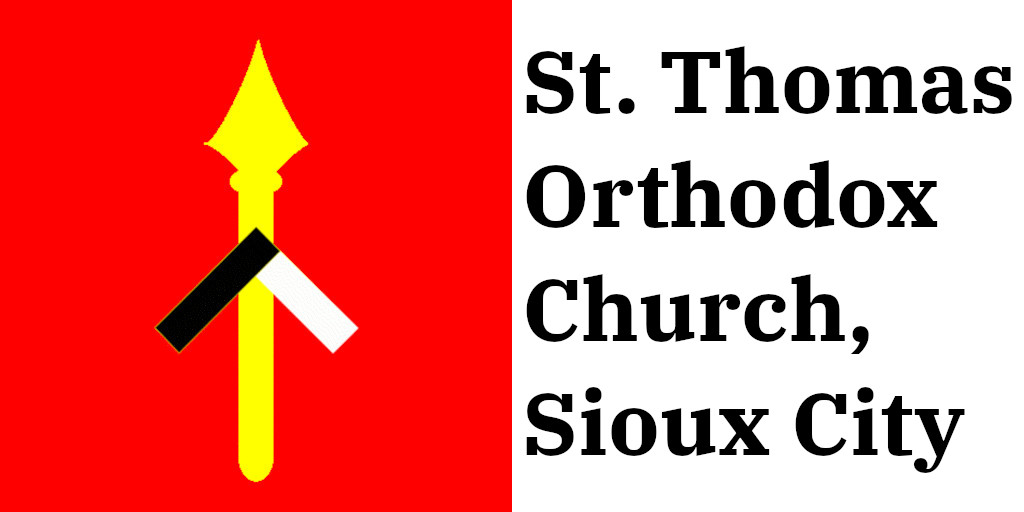

St. Thomas Orthodox Church in Sioux City, Iowa is a parish of the Chicago and Middle American Deanery of the Diocese of Chicago and Middle-America, part of the Russian Orthodox Church Outside of Russia, a constituent archdiocese of the Russian Orthodox Church. Founded in 1916, as part of the Greek Orthodox Patriarchate of Antioch to serve the Syrian and Lebanese immigrant community that existed in Sioux City at that time, it is the oldest Orthodox parish in Sioux City and has become a pan-Orthodox community with members from across the Siouxland region.

== History ==
1895
The first Syrian families move to Sioux City.
1905
Fr. Nicola Yanney of the Arab Mission of the Diocese of the Aleutians and North America of the Russian Orthodox Church performs the first Orthodox baptisms in Sioux City.
1916
Representatives from twenty-five families met on 26 June 1916 with Fr. Alia Hamaty who give them the Archdiocese's blessing to form the Syrian Orthodox Benevolent Society. The aim of the society was to build an Orthodox parish in Sioux City and to establish an Orthodox cemetery. They soon purchased the first church building for St. Thomas at 6th St and Iowa St.
1918
The parish moves the church building to a new location at 8th St and Iowa St.
1928
The Benevolent Society establishes the St. Thomas Cemetery by purchasing land adjacent to Graceland Cemetery. Graceland Cemetery itself had only been established in 1909; since 1953, Graceland Cemetery has been owned by the City of Sioux City.
1930
Fr. Michael M. Yanney — nephew of Fr. Nicola Yanney — is appointed as the first full-time rector of St. Thomas by Archbishop Victor (Abo-Assaly), the founding primate of the Antiochian Orthodox Christian Archdiocese. Serving until November 1953, he remains the longest-tenured rector in the parish's history.
1935
St. Thomas hosts its first Syrian-Lebanese Dinner. An event that would become popular throughout the Siouxland area, it would continue annually until 2014.
1938
An English-language choir, believed to be the first in any Eastern Orthodox parish in the United States, debuts at St. Thomas.
1940
In October 1940, the Divine Liturgy was first celebrated completely in English at St. Thomas; until then, it had only been celebrated in Arabic.
1945
Property is purchased at 1100 Jones St for a new church building.
1952
The congregation begins holding services in the basement of the new building in 1951 until the dedication of the completed building on 5 October 1952.
1969
St. Thomas drops the word "Syrian" from its name.
1979
A new two-story addition is dedicated on 5 September 1976 containing classrooms, a meeting room, an office for the rector, and an expanded kitchen.
2006
Fr. Tom Begley leaves after having served at St. Thomas for twenty-two years, becoming the second-longest-serving rector in the parish's history.
2016
Over Labor Day weekend, the parish celebrates its centennial with a visit from Metropolitan Joseph.
2024
Beginning January 1st, 2024 the Antiochian archdiocese formally closed St. Thomas Orthodox Church. The congregation merged with the then growing Holy Annunciation Orthodox Mission (ROCOR) as St. Thomas Orthodox Church (ROCOR)

== Today ==
Although, perhaps, best known for their food, both St. Thomas and Holy Trinity Greek Orthodox Church are known for the blessing of the Missouri River, performed annually in conjunction with the feast of Theophany.
