= Sioux City Public Library-North Side Branch =

- U.S. National Register of Historic Places
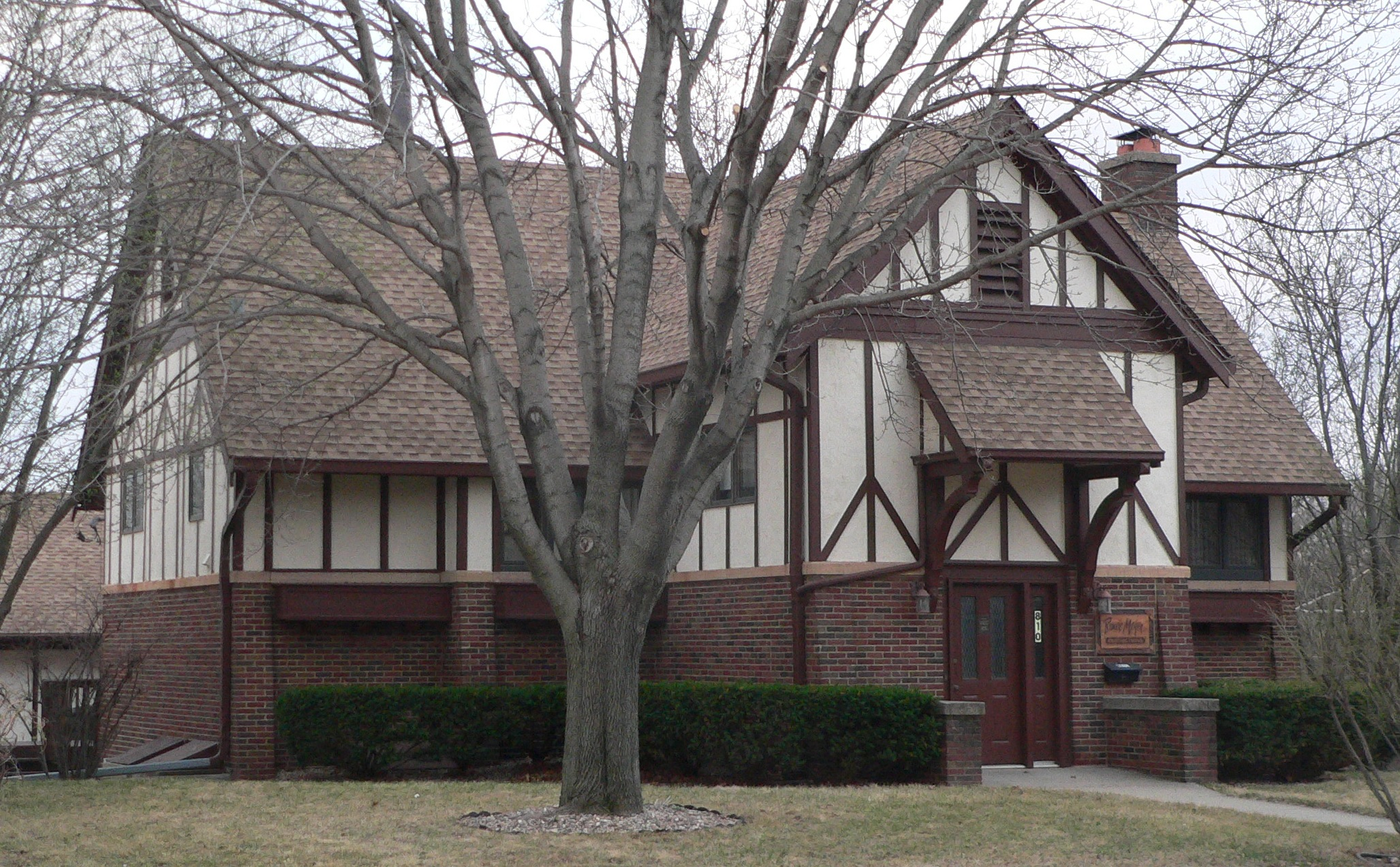

- Location within Iowa Location within the United States
- Location: 810 29th St. Sioux City, Iowa
- Coordinates: 42°31′13.5″N 96°24′01.0″W
- Area: less than one acre
- Built: 1929
- Architect: William L. Steele
- Architectural style: Tudor Revival
- NRHP reference No.: 00001479
- Added to NRHP: December 7, 2000

The Sioux City Public Library-North Side Branch, also known as Bruce Meyer Productions, is a historic building located in Sioux City, Iowa, United States. The city received a total of $85,000 in 1911 from Andrew Carnegie to build the main library and the Leeds branch library. It was the only city in Iowa to receive a grant for both a main and branch library. A $100,000 bond issue passed in 1926 to replace the temporary facilities for the other branch libraries throughout the city. The North Side Branch was designed by local architect William L. Steele in the Tudor Revival style, and was completed in 1929. It was used as a branch facility until 1982 when the city closed all of the branch libraries in 1982, except the Morningside branch. A new branch library was created on the north side. The old north branch was sold to Bruce Meyer for his photography studio. It was listed on the National Register of Historic Places in 2000.
