= Carl. F. Egge =

Carl F. Egge (c. 1872 – September 15, 1932) was an American civil servant and aviation executive who served as General Superintendent of the United States Air Mail Service from 1921 to 1925. A 30-year veteran of the U.S. Post Office Department, Egge was responsible for transforming early, hazardous daytime mail flights into a standardized, 24-hour transcontinental network. Referred to as "the father of air mail" after he died, historical records position him as the primary operational architect of the nation's early lighted transcontinental airways.

== Early Postal Career ==
Egge began his civil service career in Nebraska during the late 1890s as a local postal clerk in Grand Island, Nebraska. He soon moved to Omaha, taking a position as a railway mail clerk sorting letters aboard regional trains. His administrative talent led to a promotion as a federal postal inspector stationed in Minneapolis, Minnesota.

== General Superintendent of Air Mail (1921–1925) ==
In June 1921, Egge was appointed General Superintendent of the Air Mail Service. Taking office during a period of rising pilot casualties and budgetary threats from Congress, Egge—who had no background as a pilot—focused on procedural safety, field maintenance, and strict schedules.

Egge collaborated with Second Assistant Postmaster General Paul Henderson to construct the infrastructure necessary for overnight flying. Together with illumination engineer J. V. Magee, they established an 885-mile illuminated corridor between Chicago and Cheyenne known as the "great dark belt". The project required installing 36-inch rotating beacons atop 35-foot towers at primary fields, setting up automatic gas beacons every three miles, and carving out 34 emergency landing fields.

During the first official round-the-clock transcontinental flight service on July 1, 1924, Egge stationed himself at the Omaha airfield to personally supervise the midnight exchange of mail between coast-to-coast flights. Two months later, in September 1924, Egge moved the national division headquarters of the Air Mail Service from Washington, D.C., to the Federal Building in downtown Omaha, directing nationwide air logistics from Nebraska until the central offices returned to Washington in July 1926.

== After Retirement ==
Following the privatization of airmail routes under the 1925 Kelly Act, Egge retired from the Post Office Department. Recognizing his administrative credibility, organized airmail pilots hired Egge to head a pilot-owned corporate entity formed to bid on commercial airmail contracts.

He subsequently served as Executive Secretary of the National Air Pilots Association (NAPA), representing pilot interests during the early growth of commercial airlines. Egge died in Minneapolis on September 15, 1932, at the age of 60.

== Legacy and Historical Assessment ==
Contemporary obituaries, including those published by national wire services, frequently credited Egge with having "founded" the U.S. Air Mail Service. Egge was the key administrator who built the physical ground systems, lighted corridors, and field operational standards that allowed transcontinental airmail to function safely at scale.

== Personal life ==
Egge was married and had two children. He died and was buried in Minneapolis.
