= Sacred Heart Hospital (Le Mars, Iowa) =

- U.S. National Register of Historic Places
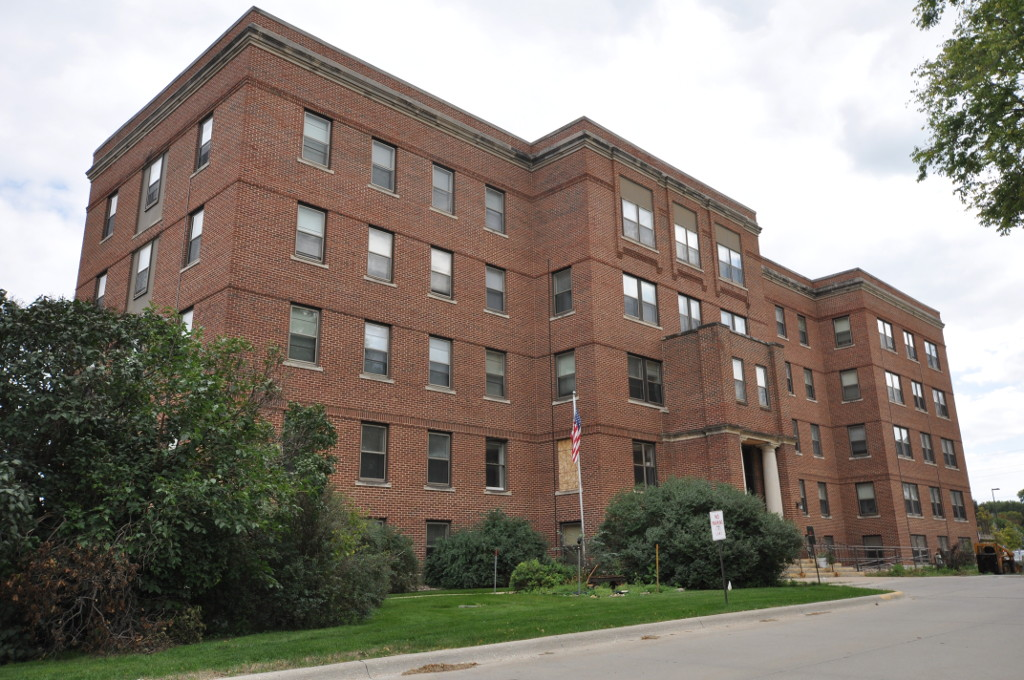

- Location within Iowa Location within the United States
- Location: 4110 6th Ave., NE; Le Mars, Iowa
- Coordinates: 42°47′16.8″N 96°09′53.3″W
- Built: 1923
- Built by: Riesche & Sanborn
- Architect: William LaBarthe Steele
- Architectural style: Late 19th and Early 20th Century American Movements
- NRHP reference No.: 09001303
- Added to NRHP: February 3, 2010

Sacred Heart Hospital, also known as the Floyd Valley Apartments, is a historic building located in Le Mars, Iowa, United States. Construction of the building began in 1921. It was designed by Sioux City architect William Steele and Riesche & Sanborn was the contractor. The five-story brick structure was completed two years later for $350,000. The Sisters of St. Francis from Dubuque operated the hospital for the next 43 years. In addition to the hospital, the building also housed Sacred Heart Nursing School from 1923 to 1938. On December 1, 1966, the City of Le Mars took over the operation of the hospital, which was renamed Floyd Valley Hospital at that time. They continued to use the Sacred Heart building. A capital campaign to build a new facility was begun in 1972, and the present hospital on Iowa Highway 3 was completed in 1976. This building has subsequently been converted into apartments. It was listed on the National Register of Historic Places in 2010.
