= S.S. Peter & Paul Catholic School (Butte, Nebraska) =

- U.S. National Register of Historic Places
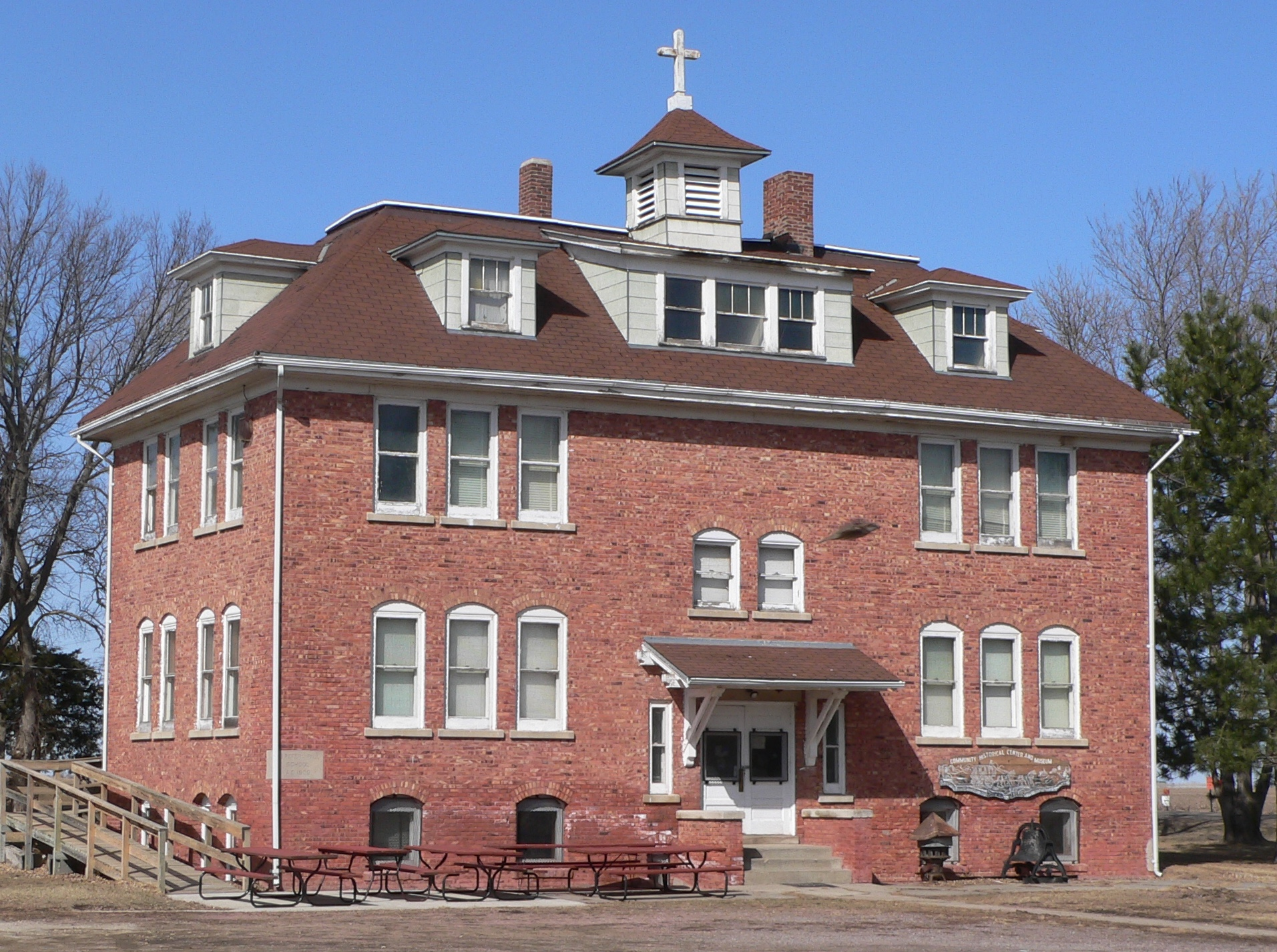

- Location within Nebraska
- Location: Jct. of 2nd and Broadway Sts., SE corner, Butte, Nebraska
- Coordinates: 42°54′54″N 98°51′10″W
- Area: less than one acre
- Built: 1909
- Built by: B.E. Short
- Architect: William L. Steele
- Architectural style: Renaissance Revival
- NRHP reference No.: 91001751
- Added to NRHP: January 7, 1992

The S.S. Peter & Paul Catholic School in Butte, Nebraska, was listed on the National Register of Historic Places in 1992.

It is a parochial school designed by William L. Steele. It was built and began operations in 1909, and is a typical example of such schools built in many Catholic communities of Nebraska in the early 20th century.

It is a 2 1/2-story Renaissance Revival style building built upon a raised basement. It was deemed "a good example of a parochial school building". It was built by Sioux City contractor B.E. Short, with brick work done by Sioux City's Steele Corporation. It housed children in a dormitory on the top, attic floor. The second floor provided a music room and quarters for the nuns who taught the school. The first floor has two large classrooms with double doors that opened into a chapel room in between, and a central hall. The basement was used for cooking, dining, and laundry. It is topped by a hipped roof with eight shingled dormers, a shingled belfry, and an air circulation vent with a white metal cross above.

It is located at the southeast corner of the intersection of 2nd and Broadway Streets.
