= James P. Newton House and Maid Cottage =

Historic house in Iowa, United States

- U.S. National Register of Historic Places
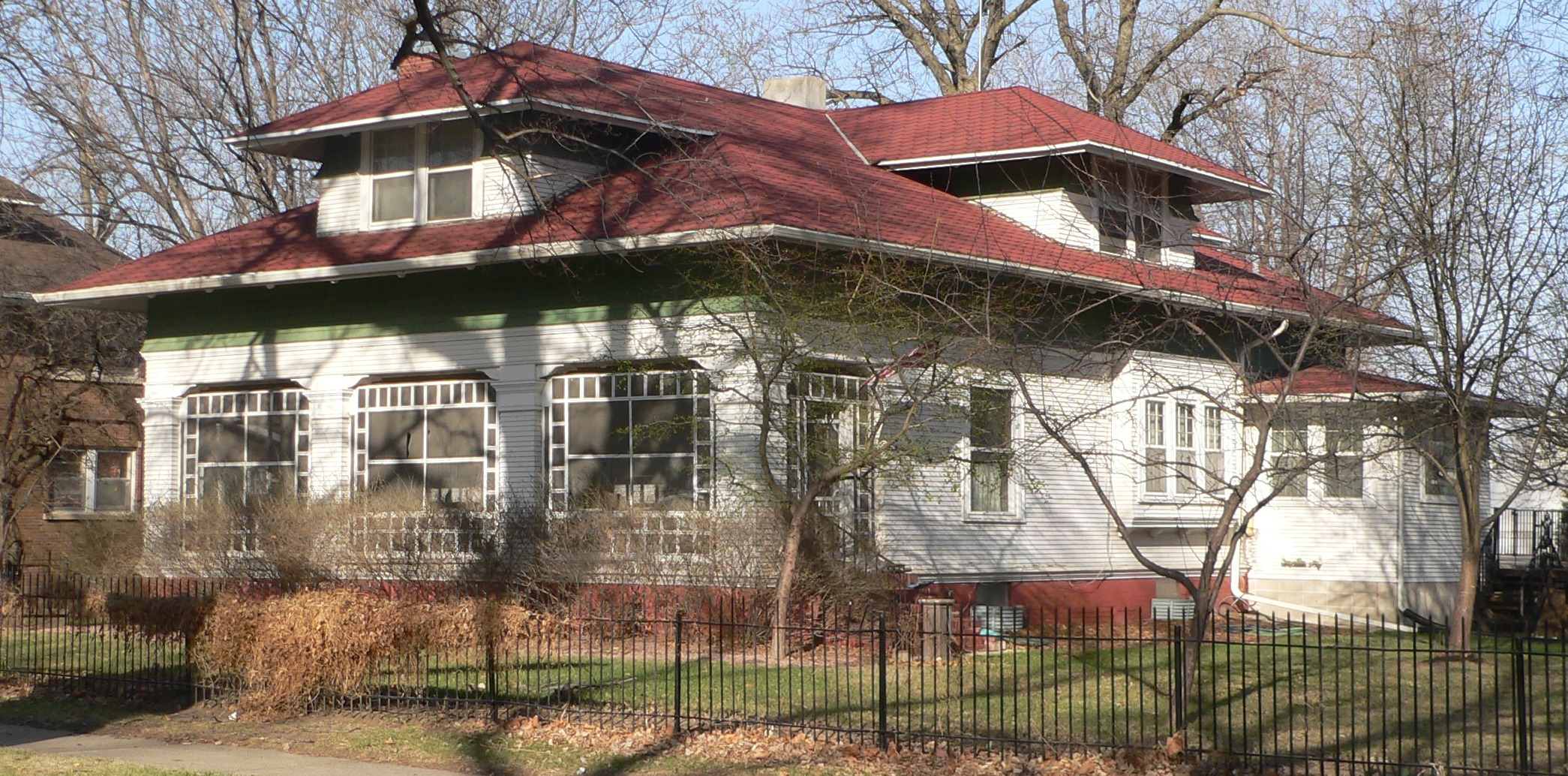
- James P. Newton House

- Location within Iowa Location within the United States
- Location: 2312 Nebraska St. Sioux City, Iowa
- Coordinates: 42°30′52.9″N 96°24′11.8″W
- Area: less than one acre
- Built: 1909
- Architect: William L. Steele
- Architectural style: Bungalow/Craftsman
- NRHP reference No.: 00000154
- Added to NRHP: March 3, 2000

The James P. Newton House and Maid Cottage are historic buildings located in Sioux City, Iowa, United States. Newton was a prominent local businessman associated with Haskins Bros. & Co., whose principal product was soap. He was a traveling salesman with the company before he and his brothers bought the company in 1907. He succeeded his brother William as president in 1929. Newton had prominent Sioux City architect William L. Steele design this house, and it is one of his earliest works in the city. The 1½-story frame American Craftsman house and the single-story frame maid's house near the alley feature clapboard siding, porches with square columns, and low pitched hipped roofs with dormers. The bands of color and the wide eaves are elements from the Prairie School style for which Steele would become well known. The two houses were listed together on the National Register of Historic Places in 2000.
