= Nebraska Board of Engineers and Architects =

Organization

- Formation: 1937; 88 years ago
- Purpose: To establish requirements for education, experience, examination, and enforcement for the practices of engineering and architecture to safeguard life, health, and property, and to promote public welfare
- Headquarters: Lincoln, NE, United States
- Website: ea.nebraska.gov

In 1937, the Nebraska State Board of Examiners for Professional Engineers and Architects (currently called the Nebraska Board of Engineers and Architects) was established to review the qualifications of individuals seeking to practice engineering or architecture in the State of Nebraska and license individuals who were deemed competent. The Board also upholds and updates the Engineers and Architects Regulation Act which governors all laws related to architecture and engineering.

== Creation ==
By 1937, many states in the United States had already created some kind of architecture of engineering board, with Illinois having the first architecture board in 1897 and Wyoming having the first engineering board in 1907.

As the professions were similar, Nebraska decided to combine them in one board. Robert Leroy Cochran, governor of Nebraska at the time, signed the Engineers and Architects Regulation Act into law. Cochran himself was an engineer and became the first licensed engineer in Nebraska.

The first board meeting was May 25, 1937, and consisted of five members: William L. Steele (architect), Charles Steinbaugh (architect), David Erickson (engineer), Roy Green (engineer), and Albert Turner (engineer).

== Current Board ==
After several law changes over the decades, the board is now composed of eight members: one member of the public (not licensed as an architect or professional engineer), three architects, and four professional engineers. Architects and professional engineers must be licensed in the state of Nebraska. One architect and one professional engineer must be active faculty at the University of Nebraska–Lincoln Each member of the Board will hold a five-year term and are selected, or reappointed by the current governor.
