= William L. Steele =

American architect

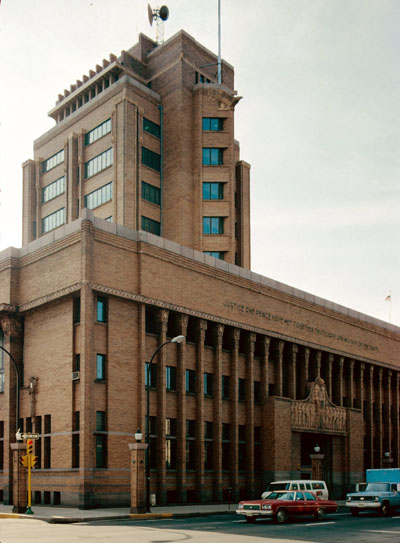
William L. Steele, Purcell & Elmslie, Associated Architects, Woodbury County Courthouse (1916)

William LaBarthe Steele (May 2, 1875 – March 4, 1949) was an American architect from Chicago, Illinois. He is considered a principal member of the Prairie School Architectural Movement during the early 20th century.

== Career ==
After graduating from the University of Illinois, Steele worked under renowned architect Louis Sullivan in Chicago, Illinois, from 1897 to 1900. He later moved to Pittsburgh, Pennsylvania, where he worked at several firms.

In 1904, he settled in Sioux City, Iowa, where he stayed for 25 years until moving to Omaha, Nebraska, in 1929. Around this time, he and Thomas Rogers Kimball founded an architectural firm that eventually became Steele, Sandham, and Steele. He designed over 250 commercial buildings, churches, synagogues, homes, schools, and government buildings in Iowa, Nebraska, South Dakota, and Minnesota.

The Woodbury County Courthouse in Sioux City is considered to be a premier example of Prairie School aesthetics, which he developed along with Minneapolis-based architects George Grant Elmslie and William Gray Purcell. All three men had previously worked for Sullivan in various roles. The Courthouse, along with Walthill Hospital in Nebraska (1912), are both designated National Historic Landmarks. Over 20 of his surviving works are on the National Register of Historic Places (NrHP).

Steele was one of the founding members of The Nebraska State Board of Examiners for Professional Engineers and Architects (now known as the Nebraska Board of Engineers and Architects). He served on the Board from 1937 to 1942.

== Selected works ==
- Sioux County Courthouse (Orange City, Iowa) (1902–04), designed by architect Wilfred W. Beach; Steele worked as a draftsman on the project before it ended, and later partnered briefly with Beach. NRHP-listed.
- Florence Crittenton Home (1906), 1105-1111 28th St., Sioux City, IA Beach & Steele, formerly NRHP-listed
- Dr. Susan LaFlesche Picotte Memorial Hospital (1912), 505 Matthewson St., Walthill, NE Steele, William, NRHP-listed
- Davidson Building (1913), 505 6th St., Sioux City, IA Steele, William LaBarthe, NRHP-listed
- St. Patrick's Catholic Church, Cedar (1915), 4 mi. W of Churdan on E 19, .5 mi. N on gravel rd., Churdan, IA Steele, William LeBarthe, NRHP-listed
- St. Casimir Lithuanian Roman Catholic Church (1915), Sioux City, IA, since demolished.
- H.H. Everist House (1916–17), 37 McDonald Dr., Sioux City, IA Steele, William LaBarthe, NRHP-listed
- Woodbury County Courthouse (1916–18) designed by George Grant Elmslie in collaboration with the Sioux City architect William L. Steele and Elmslie's partner, William Gray Purcell, a National Historic Landmark
- First Congregational Church, Former (Sioux City, Iowa) (1916–18), a.k.a. Sioux City Baptist Church, 1301 Nebraska Ave., Sioux City, IA Steele, William, NRHP-listed
- Hawarden City Hall, Fire Station and Auditorium (1918), 715 Central Ave., Hawarden, IA Steele, William La Barthe, NRHP-listed
- Charles Mix County Courthouse (1918), Main St. between Fourth and Fifth Sts., Lake Andes, SD Steele, William L., NRHP-listed
- Sacred Heart Hospital (1921), 110 6th Ave. NE, Le Mars, IA Steele, William LaBarthe, NRHP-listed
- Sacred Heart Catholic Church (1921) 211 S. 13th St., Fort Dodge, IA, NRHP-listed
- Hartington City Hall and Auditorium (1921–23), 101 N. Broadway, Hartington, NE Steele, William L., NRHP-listed
- Mount Sinai Temple (1922 addition), 1320 Nebraska St., Sioux City, IA Steele, William L, NRHP-listed
- Harold A. (H.A.) Doyle House (1924), 712 W. Third St., Yankton, SD Steele, William L., NRHP-listed
- Holy Trinity Greek Orthodox Church (1925), 900 6th St., Sioux City, IA Steele, William L., NRHP-listed
- Sioux City Fire Station Number 3 (1929), NRHP-listed. Local lore suggests Steele was the architect.
- Williges Building (1930), 613-615 Pierce St., Sioux City, IA Steele & Hilgers, NRHP-listed. Steele's last work in Sioux City
- Ben and Harriet Schulein House, 2604 Jackson St., Sioux City, IA Steele, William LaBarthe, NRHP-listed
- Sioux City Public Library (Smith Villa Branch), 1509 George Ave., Sioux City, IA Steele, William, NRHP-listed
- Sts. Peter & Paul School, Jct. of 2nd and Broadway Sts., SE corner, Butte, NE Steele, William L., NRHP-listed
- St. Rose of Lima Catholic Church and School Complex, 1302-1316 S 5th St, Crofton, NE Steele, William L., NRHP-listed
- One or more buildings in the W.L. and Winnie (Woodfield) Belfrage Farmstead Historic District, NRHP-listed
- One or more works in Foster Park Historic District, 500-900 blks. Central Ave. S. & blocks around Foster Park, Le Mars, IA Steele, William La Barthe, NRHP-listed
- One or more works in Le Mars Downtown Commercial Historic District, Bounded by 2nd St., N, 2nd Ave., W., 1st St., S., & 1st Ave., E., Le Mars, IA Steele & Hilgers; Beuttler, William, NRHP-listed
- St. Boniface Catholic Church (Sioux City, Iowa), which is a major part of the St. Boniface Historic District, 703 W. 5th St., 515 Cook St., 700 W. 6th St., Sioux City, IA Steele, William LaBarthe, NRHP-listed
- James P. Newton House and Maid Cottage, 2312 Nebraska St., Sioux City, IA Steele, William I., NRHP-listed (and this is an inbound link, and L. vs. I. fix noted at wp:NRIS info issues IA)
- Sioux City Public Library-North Side Branch, 810 29th St., Sioux City, IA Steele, William I., NRHP-listed (and this has inbound link, and L. vs. I. fix noted at wp:NRIS info issues IA)

== Other ==
Architect Knute E. Westerlind, a protégé of Steele's, designed the PWA Moderne Sioux City Municipal Auditorium in 1938.

== See also ==
- Cathedral of the Epiphany (Sioux City, Iowa) (not NRIS)
- Federal Office Building (Omaha, Nebraska)
- IVY Hotel + Residences
- List of Greek Orthodox churches in the United States
- Sioux City Free Public Library
- Sioux City Public Library (Smith Villa Branch)
- T.S. Martin and Company
