= Williges Building =

- U.S. National Register of Historic Places
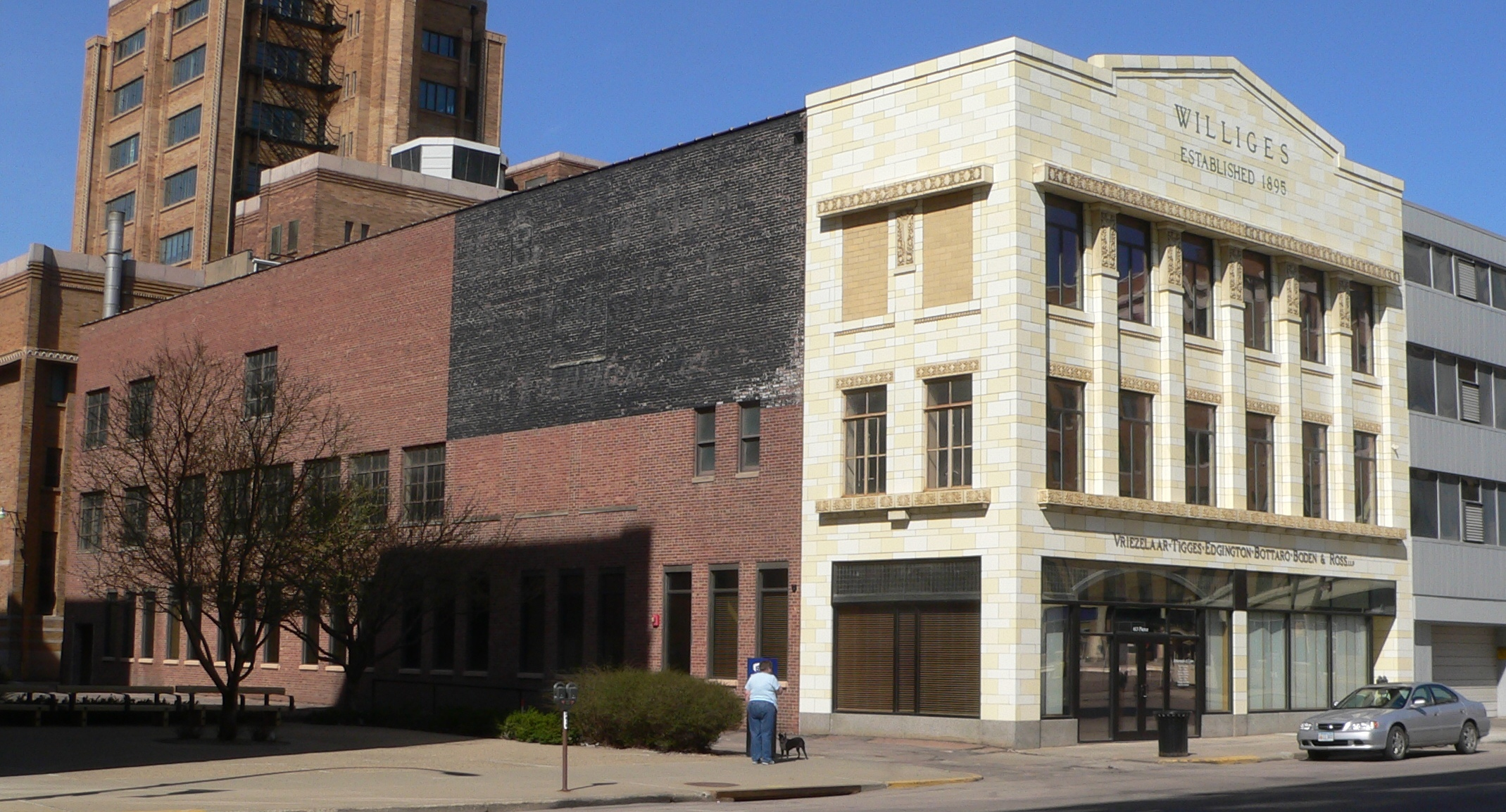

- Location within Iowa Location within the United States
- Location: 613-615 Pierce St. Sioux City, Iowa
- Coordinates: 42°29′49.1″N 96°24′18.8″W
- Area: less than one acre
- Built: 1930
- Built by: Reische & Sanborn
- Architect: Steele & Hilgers
- Architectural style: Prairie School
- NRHP reference No.: 07000850
- Added to NRHP: August 31, 2007

The Williges Building, also known as Cownie-Williges Building, is a historic building located in Sioux City, Iowa, United States. It is a three-story commercial block that was designed by local architects William L. Steele and George Hilgers. The structure was built for August Williges to house his fur manufacturing factory, salesroom, and storage facility. The decorative terra cotta details on the main facade are Sullivanesque in style, which reflects Steele's association with Louis Sullivan from 1897 to 1900. Completed in 1930, it is one of the last commercial buildings constructed in the early Prairie School style in the United States, and Steele's last architectural commission in Sioux City. It was also built at the end of the period of time when terra cotta was popularly used as wall cladding. The building was listed on the National Register of Historic Places in 2007.
