= Sacred Heart Catholic Church (Fort Dodge, Iowa) =

- U.S. National Register of Historic Places
- Location within Iowa Location within the United States
- Location: 211 South 13th St. Fort Dodge, Iowa
- Coordinates: 42°30′13.9″N 94°10′49.5″W
- Area: less than one acre
- Built: 1921
- Architect: William L. Steele
- Architectural style: Romanesque Revival
- NRHP reference No.: 100008305
- Added to NRHP: October 26, 2022

Sacred Heart Catholic Church was a parish church in the Diocese of Sioux City. The church building is located in Fort Dodge, Iowa, United States. It was listed on the National Register of Historic Places in 2022.

== History ==
Sacred Heart parish was established in 1897 from Corpus Christi, also in Fort Dodge. Archbishop John Hennessy of Dubuque assigned the Rev. Edmond Heelan as the parish's first pastor. A frame church building was completed by October 1897 on the site of the present church.

As the parish grew it was determined that a larger church building was needed. Sioux City architect William L. Steele designed the new building in the Romanesque Revival style with Prairie School influences. Construction began in 1915 and the basement was completed the following year. It was used by the parish as its church until the upper church was completed in 1921. In the meantime, Heelan had become auxiliary bishop of Sioux City. He returned to Fort Dodge to dedicate the new church in 1922.

The city's third Catholic parish, Holy Rosary, was created from Sacred Heart in 1946. In 2000, the parishes in Webster County formed the Catholic Team Parishes. Six years later, Bishop R. Walker Nickless merged all of the county's parishes and created Holy Trinity Parish. The last Mass was held in Sacred Heart in 2019 when the new Holy Trinity Church was opened. The pew ends, altar, Rose window, and the top-tier stained glass windows from Sacred Heart were installed in the new Holy Trinity.
