= Hawarden City Hall, Fire Station and Auditorium =

- U.S. National Register of Historic Places
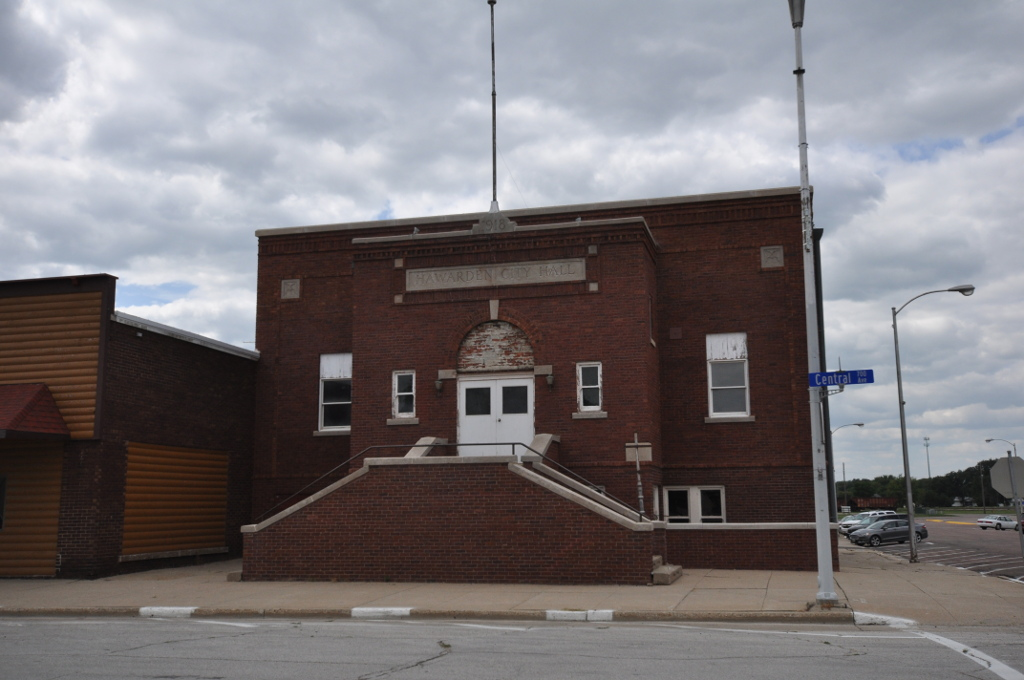

- Location within Iowa Location within the United States
- Location: 715 Central Ave. Hawarden, Iowa
- Coordinates: 42°59′39″N 96°29′08″W
- Area: less than one acre
- Built: 1918
- Built by: Parkinson & Co.
- Architect: William LaBarthe Steele
- Architectural style: Late 19th and early 20th-century American Movements
- NRHP reference No.: 09000107
- Added to NRHP: March 10, 2009

The Hawarden City Hall, Fire Station and Auditorium, also known as City Auditorium and the Community Center, is a historic building located in Hawarden, Iowa, United States. The structure is an example of Progressivism, popular throughout the United States from the 1890s through the 1920s. Besides constructing this building, Progressivism was responsible for constructing hard-surfaced streets, street lighting, and installing sanitary and storm sewers in Hawarden. Sioux City architect William L. Steele was responsible for designing the building. Completed in 1918, it is a two-story brick structure. The auditorium occupies the main floor and is accessed by an exterior staircase in the front of the building. City government offices occupied the first floor, with the fire department on the far end. There are two bays for the fire equipment. City government remained in this building until 1981 when it moved to the refurbished Chicago & Northwestern Railway Passenger Depot a block to the south. The building has remained empty for the most part since then. It was listed on the National Register of Historic Places in 2009.
