= Le Mars Downtown Commercial Historic District =

Historic district in Iowa, United States

- U.S. National Register of Historic Places
- U.S. Historic district
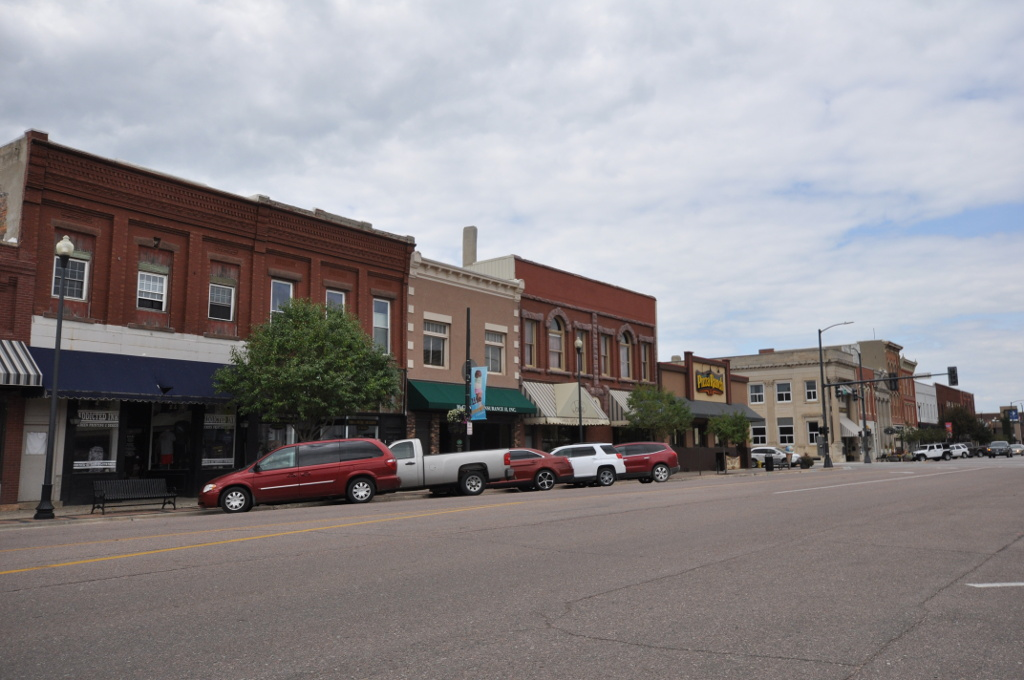

- Location within Iowa Location within the United States
- Location: Bounded by 2nd St., N, 2nd Ave., W., 1st St., S., & 1st Ave., E., Le Mars, Iowa
- Coordinates: 42°47′37″N 96°10′02″W
- Area: 17 acres (6.9 ha)
- Architect: Steele & Hilgers; William Beuttler; U.S. Treasury
- Architectural style: Bungalow/Craftsman; Modern Movement
- NRHP reference No.: 12000908
- Added to NRHP: November 6, 2012

Le Mars Downtown Commercial Historic District is a nationally recognized historic district located in Le Mars, Iowa, United States. It was listed on the National Register of Historic Places in 2012. At the time of its nomination the district consisted of 96 resources, including 73 contributing buildings and 23 non-contributing buildings.

Le Mars is located in northwest Iowa, which is the last part of the state to be settled. Settlement came with the railroads. The Iowa Falls & Sioux City Railroad was built through the region in 1869 to 1870. In June 1870, the town was platted, and two years later it won an election to move the county seat from Melbourne. It grew to become a regional economic center from the late 19th century through the post-World War II period. The historic district covers most of the city's central business district. The buildings date from c. 1879 to 1958, with historic alterations through 1962. The vast majority of the buildings serve a commercial function, with their second-story housing meeting halls, professional offices, or residential units. Other functions include light industrial, recreational, social, healthcare, and government. They are all masonry construction of red or buff brick and are from one to three stories tall. The buildings reflect the styles from the time they were built.
