= H.H. Everist House =

Historic house in Iowa, United States

- U.S. National Register of Historic Places
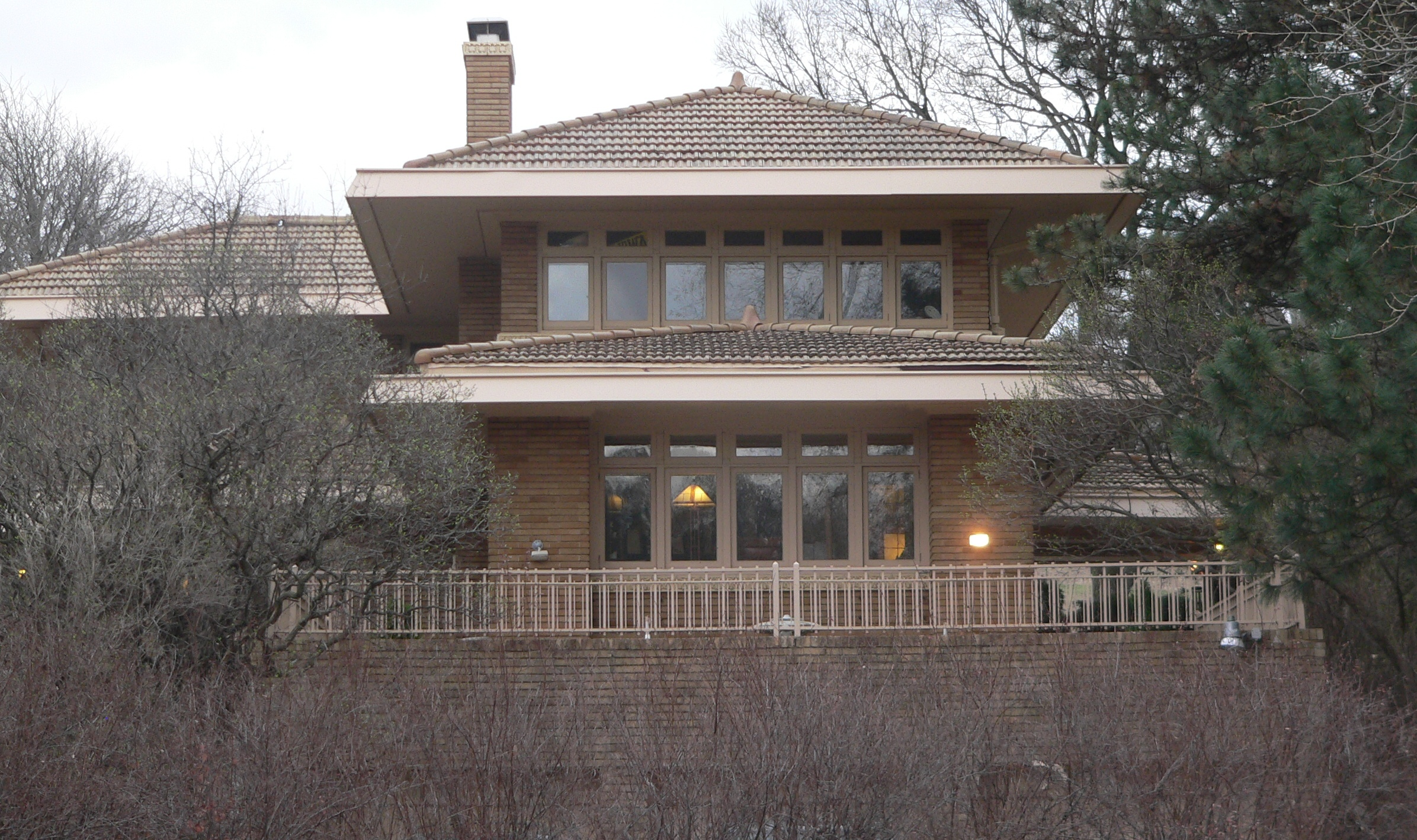

- Location within Iowa Location within the United States
- Location: 37 McDonald Dr. Sioux City, Iowa
- Coordinates: 42°31′07.6″N 96°24′39.9″W
- Area: less than one acre
- Built: 1916-1917
- Built by: M.N. Hegg
- Architect: William LaBarthe Steele
- Architectural style: Prairie School
- NRHP reference No.: 83000413
- Added to NRHP: September 29, 1983

The H.H. Everist House is a historic building located in Sioux City, Iowa, United States. Everist was the founder of L. G. Everist Inc. and Western Contracting Corporation. He had local architect William L. Steele design this Prairie School-style house. It is considered the finest example of Steele's residential designs in this style. M.N. Hegg built the house from 1916 to 1917, and he completed the drive in garage and landscaping in 1920. The irregular plan of the structure is executed on three levels. It features a horizontal emphasis with bands of windows. Decorative terra cotta bands are used as belt courses, chimney parapets, coping and trim work. The house is capped with multiple broad, tiled, overhanging hipped roofs. It was listed on the National Register of Historic Places in 1983.
