= Mount Sinai Temple (Sioux City, Iowa) =

Historic Reform synagogues in Sioux City, Iowa, US

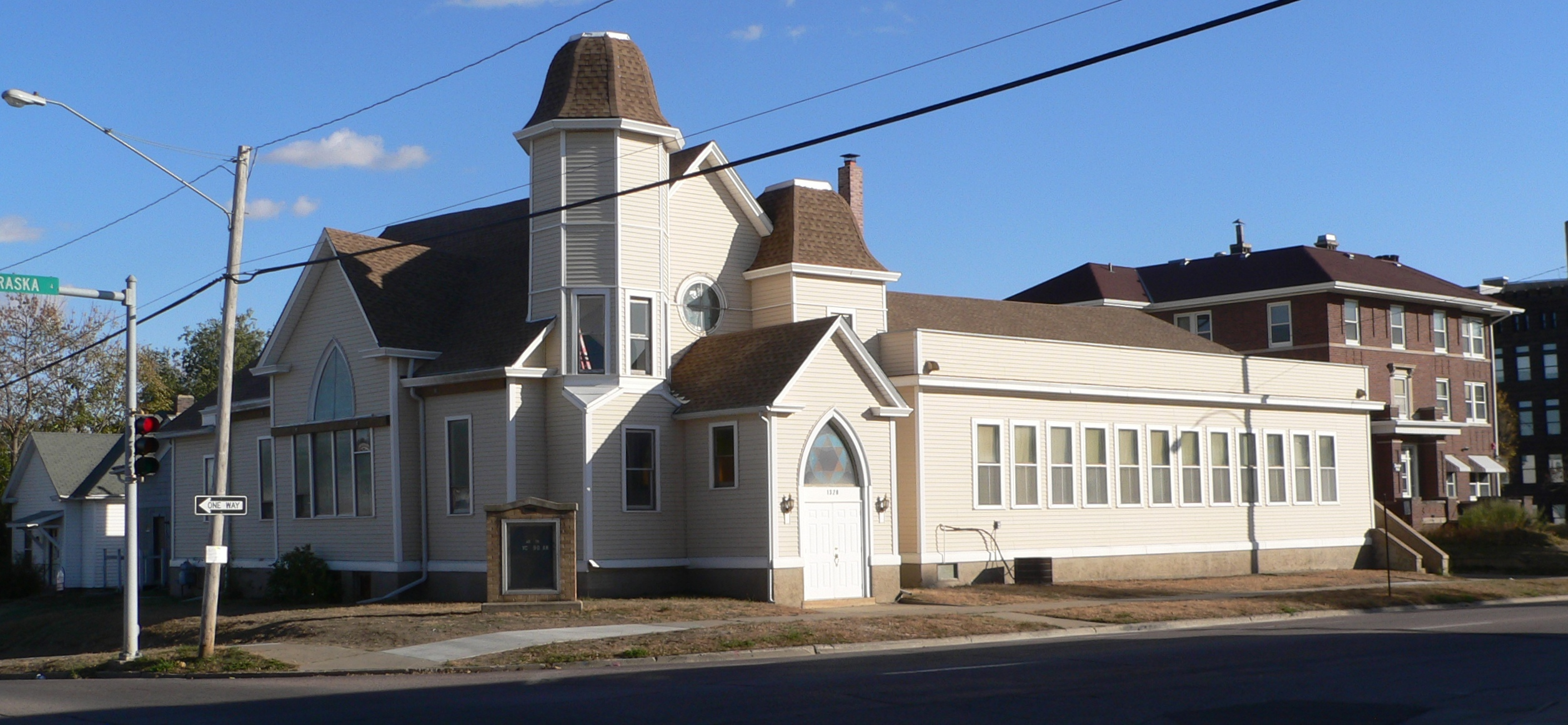
- The former Reform synagogue, in 2011

- Location of the former Reform synagogue in Iowa Mount Sinai Temple (Sioux City, Iowa) (the United States)

Religion
- Affiliation: Reform Judaism (former); United Orthodox
- Ecclesiastical or organisational status: Synagogue
- Status: Active (Note: No evidence of closure of the United Orthodox congregation, although numbers had dwindled to less than a handful, as of 2004.)

Location
- Location: 1320 Nebraska Street, Sioux City, Iowa
- Country: United States
- Coordinates: 42°30′18″N 96°24′10″W

Architecture
- Architects: G. W. Burkhead (1901); William L. Steele (1922)
- Type: Synagogue
- Style: Queen Anne (1901); Prairie School (1922)
- General contractor: Ostling & Johnson
- Established: 1898 (as a congregation)
- Completed: 1901, 1922
- Mount Sinai Temple
- U.S. National Register of Historic Places
- Area: less than 1 acre
- NRHP reference No.: 99001268
- Added to NRHP: October 21, 1999

Mount Sinai Temple is an historic former Reform synagogue located in Sioux City, Iowa, in the United States. The building was listed on the National Register of Historic Places in 1999.

== History ==
There were Jews living in Sioux City as early as the 1860s, but a synagogue was not built in the city until 1884. Adas Jeshurun was an Orthodox congregation. The Jewish community in Sioux City grew from 200 in 1890 to nearly 2,500 by World War I. Sioux City was home to the second largest Jewish community in the state of Iowa at the time.

Mount Sinai Temple congregation was established in 1898. However, the Reform Jewish community had organized a cemetery association in 1869 and had been worshipping regularly in concert with the Unitarian Church of Sioux City. The Mount Sinai Temple was designed by George Washington Burkhead in the Queen Anne-style, was built as a 1 1/2-story, frame, clapboard- and shingle-sided, building, and opened in 1901. Its 1922 addition was designed by William L. Steele was in Prairie School style.

Between World Wars I and II the Jewish Community Center in Sioux City hosted 60 to 70 clubs, classes, and organizations that ranged from socialist workers to Zionists. A one-mile section of West Seventh Street was home to 22 Jewish owned businesses in 1944.

In 1956, the congregation outgrew the Nebraska Street synagogue, and a larger facility was constructed on 38th Street. The Nebraska Street synagogue became home to the United Orthodox Synagogue, formed from several Orthodox congregations whose numbers were diminishing.

After World War II the Jewish community in Sioux City began to decline. By the mid 1980s the population was down to 700 people, and by 2001 it was down to 300. The Jewish congregations in Sioux City combined their religious schools in 1990. In 1994, the Conservative Shaare Zion and the Reform Mount Sinai congregations merged into a dual-affiliation synagogue called Beth Sholom.
