= Foster Park Historic District =

Historic district in Iowa, United States

- U.S. National Register of Historic Places
- U.S. Historic district
- Location within Iowa Location within the United States
- Location: 500-900 blocks of Central Ave., S. and blocks around Foster Park, Le Mars, Iowa
- Coordinates: 42°47′01.3″N 96°09′59.1″W
- Area: 51 acres (21 ha)
- Architect: William L. Steele
- Architectural style: Late Victorian; Colonial Revival
- NRHP reference No.: 08000329
- Added to NRHP: April 25, 2008

The Foster Park Historic District is a nationally recognized historic district located in Le Mars, Iowa, United States. It was listed on the National Register of Historic Places in 2008. At the time of its nomination the district consisted of 237 resources, including 166 contributing buildings, one contributing site, 65 non-contributing buildings, one non-contributing structure, and four non-contributing objects. The district comprises ten full blocks and nine half blocks. The historic buildings are houses and their attendant garages, carriage houses, or barns. The houses are between one and 2½-stories and are composed of frame, brick or stucco construction. For the most part they were built between the 1880s and the 1930s. Architectural styles include the revivals styles of the Late Victorian era to the Colonial Revival and American Craftsman styles of the early 20th century. Sioux City architect William L. Steele has several commissions in the district, as do other architects. Foster Park was established on one of the blocks along Central Avenue. It became a focal point for the neighborhood.
