= Sioux City Fire Station Number 3 =

- U.S. National Register of Historic Places
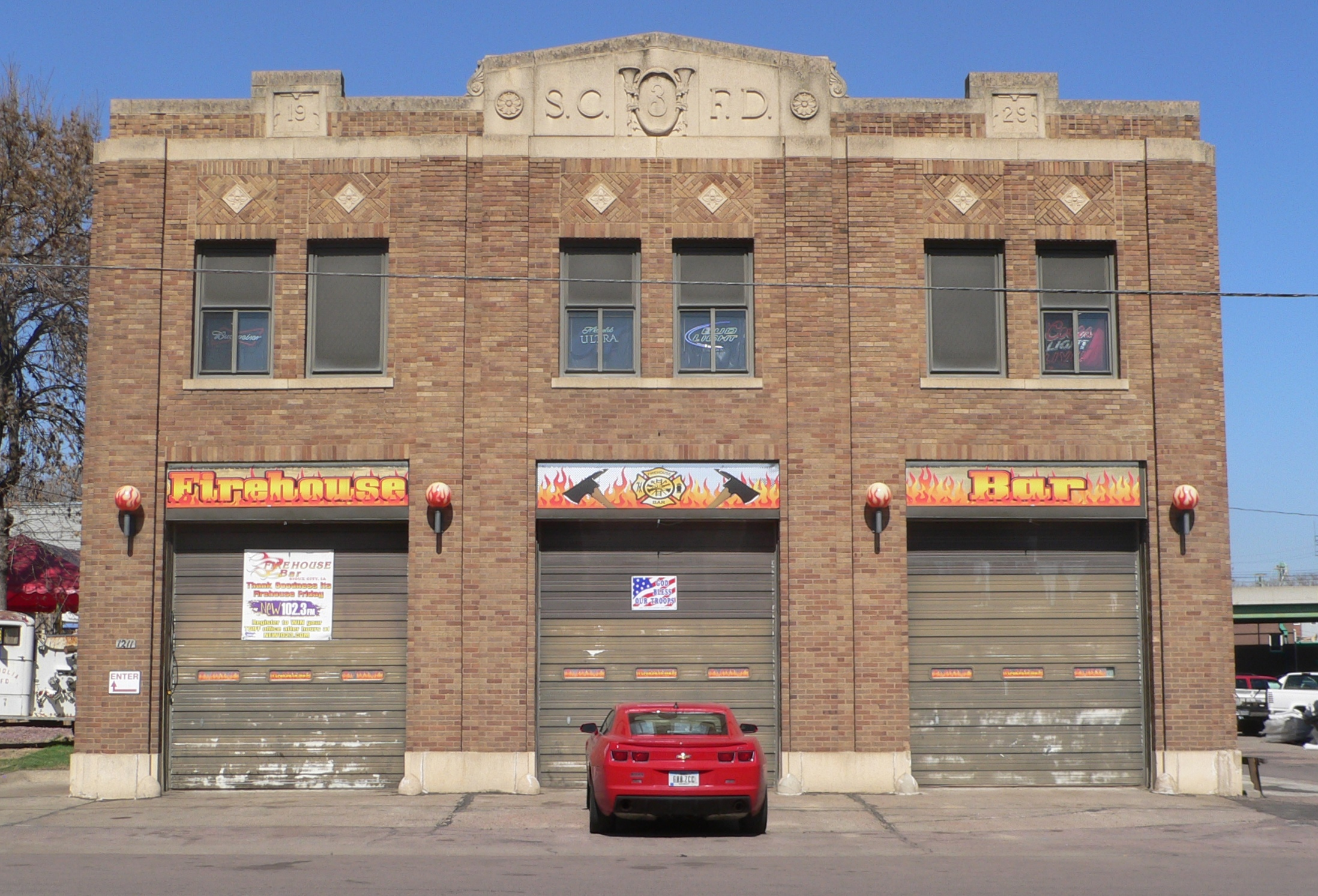

- Location within Iowa Location within the United States
- Location: 1211 5th St. Sioux City, Iowa
- Coordinates: 42°29′43.9″N 96°23′39.6″W
- Area: less than one acre
- Built: 1929
- Architectural style: Late 19th and 20th Century Revivals; Late 19th and 20th Century American Movements
- NRHP reference No.: 08000444
- Added to NRHP: May 21, 2008

The Sioux City Fire Station Number 3, also known as the Firehouse Bar, is a historic building located in Sioux City, Iowa, United States. The city's fire department began when a group of volunteers formed the Fire Protection Organization in 1869. It was formally organized in 1876. This building was completed in 1929, and replaced an older structure from around 1884. Station Number 3 served an area that mostly contained commercial buildings on the east side of downtown and a warehouse district along the Floyd River. It served as the fire department headquarters for a short time when Station Number 1 was abandoned. It long served as a training station, and a wooden training tower was located here from at least 1924 and into the 1960s.

The building itself followed the "storefront" model for a fire station where the apparatus was housed on the main floor and living quaraters above. It features basket weave brick panels and concrete ornamentation for the pilaster bases and capstones, banding, and parapet. The building is similar to Station Number 7 that was built in the Leeds neighborhood in 1937. That suggests the same architect, who is unknown, but local lore suggests William L. Steele may be the architect. A design for Fire Station Number 1 from 1922 is attributed to him, although never built, and is similar to the two stations that were built. The building was listed on the National Register of Historic Places in 2008, and now houses a bar.
