= Sioux City Public Library (Smith Villa Branch) =

- U.S. National Register of Historic Places
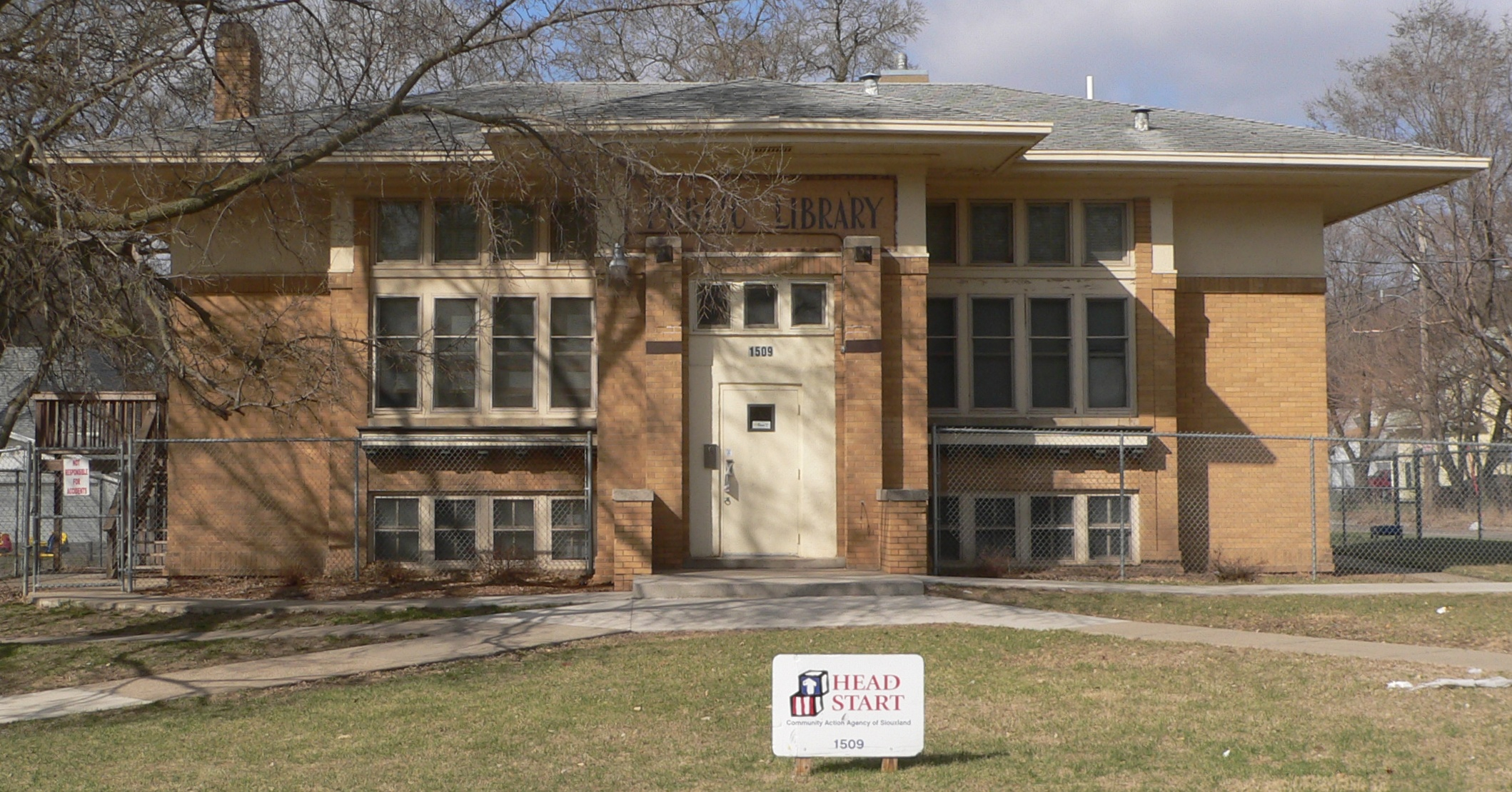

- Location within Iowa Location within the United States
- Location: 1509 George Ave. Sioux City, Iowa
- Coordinates: 42°30′23.1″N 96°25′38.7″W
- Area: less than one acre
- Built: 1927
- Architect: William Steele
- Architectural style: Prairie School
- MPS: Public Library Buildings in Iowa TR
- NRHP reference No.: 83000415
- Added to NRHP: May 23, 1983

The Sioux City Public Library (Smith Villa Branch) is a historic building located in Sioux City, Iowa, United States. Local architect William L. Steele designed the Prairie School-style building, which was completed in 1927. This was long after the style was no longer fashionable in its native Chicago, but it shows its staying power in other areas of the Midwest. The building is identical to the former Fairmount Branch, which was built the same year. The Smith Villa Branch was listed on the National Register of Historic Places in 1983. The building now houses a Head Start program.
