= T.S. Martin and Company =

- U.S. National Register of Historic Places
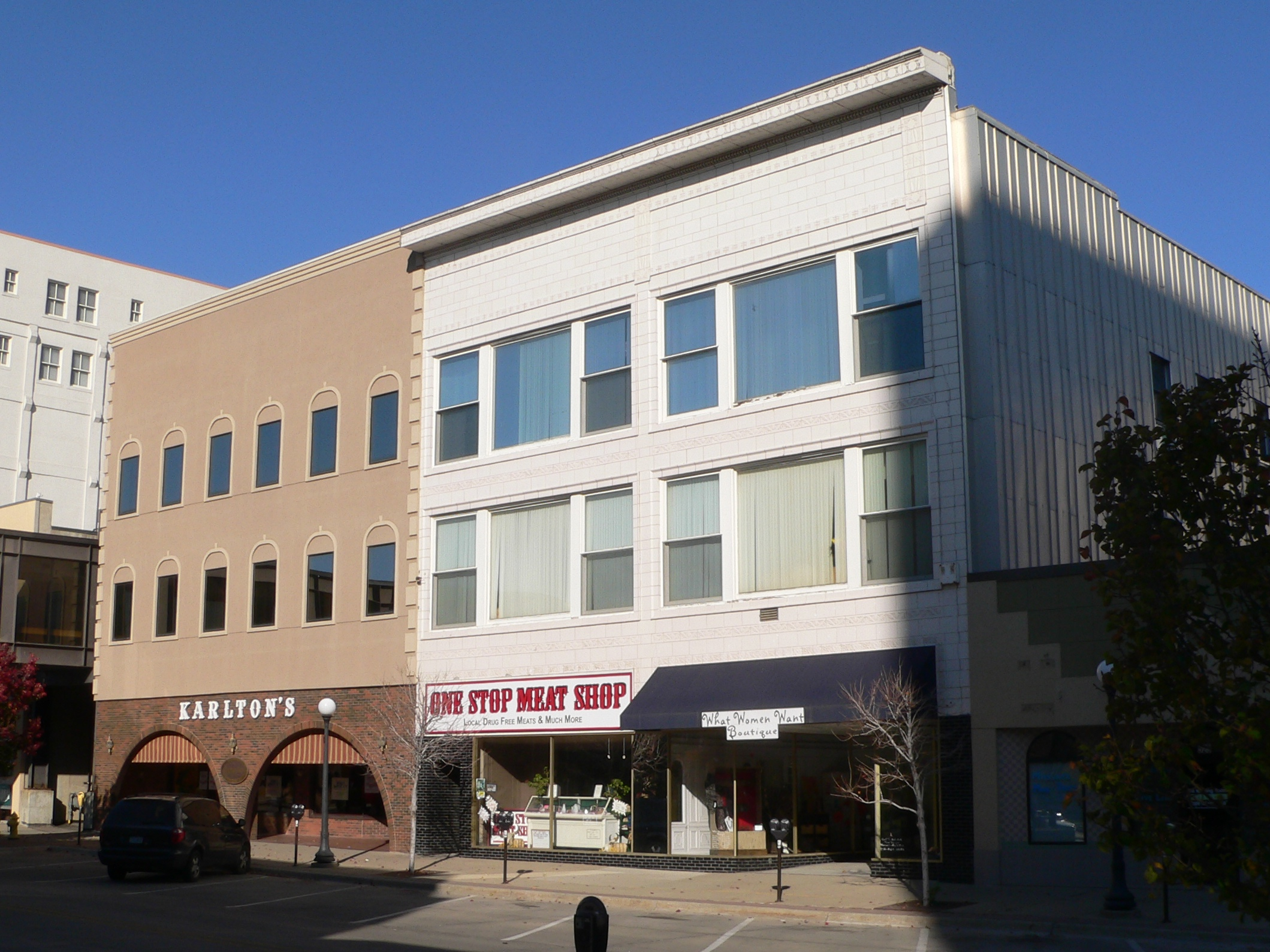
- 515-517, 519 and 521 Fourth St.

- Location within Iowa Location within the United States
- Location: Junction of 4th St. and Nebraska St. Sioux City, Iowa
- Coordinates: 42°29′40″N 96°24′14.3″W
- Area: less than one acre
- Built: 1902, 1911
- Architect: William McLaughlin; Henry Fisher; William L. Steele
- Architectural style: Beaux-Arts; Prairie School
- NRHP reference No.: 98000865
- Added to NRHP: July 15, 1998

T.S. Martin and Company, also known as Karlton's, Fishgalls & Cameo, is a historic building located in Sioux City, Iowa, United States. It is an L-shaped structure that fronts both Fourth Street and Nebraska Street. It was occupied by one of three locally owned department stores from 1894 to 1919. The buildings on Fourth Street were originally built in 1885. T.S. Martin and Company itself dates from 1880 when Thomas Sanford Martin opened a dry goods store in rented commercial space. He first acquired 515-517 Fourth Street in 1885, which he leased to a clothing store, and his brother Louis opened T.S. Martin and Company Shoes by leasing 519 Fourth Street the same year.

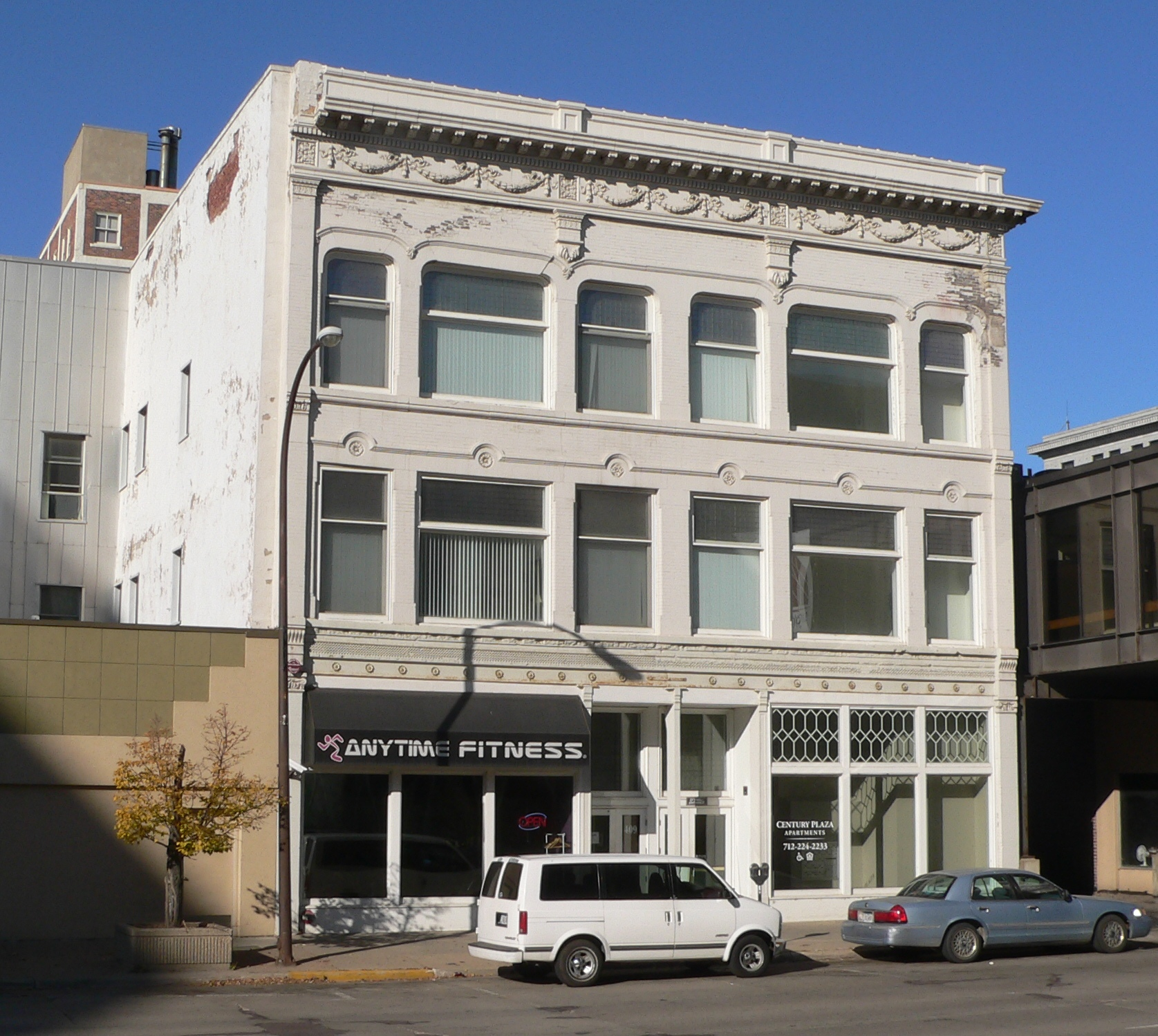
The annex at 409-411 Nebraska St.

Local architect William McLaughlin was hired to renovate 515-17 Fourth and neighboring 519 Fourth Street, and T.S. Martin and Company moved their whole operation in 1894. In 1901 they hired another local architect, Henry Fisher, to design an annex along Nebraska Street. The three-story building completed in 1902 features Beaux-Arts styling that includes a roof-line knee wall, and a cornice with acanthus leaf brackets and decorative swags. Martin's acquired 521 Fourth Street, a mirror image of 519 Fourth Street, in 1904. In 1911 they hired yet another local architect, William L. Steele, to design a completely new facade to unify 515–517, 519 and 521 Fourth Street. Designed in the Prairie School mode, it features white terra cotta, long decorative bands of terra cotta details of foliage and geometric patterns, and Chicago-style windows.

After T.S. Martin and Company moved into a new six-story building across Nebraska Street, no longer extant, in 1919 this facility was divided into multiple storefronts and occupied by a variety of commercial enterprises. The 515-517 portion of the Fourth Street facade was covered with a wood face and its cornice removed, before it was significantly altered to its present appearance. T.S. Martin and Company was bought by The May Department Stores Company of St. Louis in 1948. It was the last locally owned department store at the time. The building was listed on the National Register of Historic Places in 1998.
