= W.L. and Winnie (Woodfield) Belfrage Farmstead Historic District =

Historic district in Iowa, United States

- U.S. National Register of Historic Places
- U.S. Historic district
- Location within Iowa Location within the United States
- Location: 2410 Port Neal Road
- Nearest city: Sergeant Bluff, Iowa
- Coordinates: 42°21′32″N 96°20′58″W
- Area: 2.8 acres (1.1 ha)
- Built by: Holtze Construction Co. Aaron Gunderson
- Architect: William L. Steele
- Architectural style: Prairie School
- NRHP reference No.: 100001819
- Added to NRHP: November 16, 2017

The W.L. and Winnie (Woodfield) Belfrage Farmstead Historic District is a nationally recognized historic district located south of Sergeant Bluff, Iowa, United States. It was listed on the National Register of Historic Places in 2017. At the time of its nomination it contained six resources, which included four contributing buildings and two non-contributing buildings. The four contributing buildings are the dairy barn (1910), farmhouse (1920), brooder house (c. 1945), and the chicken coop (c. 1945). The two no-contributing buildings are the cattle shed (1960) and the garage/utility building (2006).

Its significance is found in the Prairie School-style farmhouse designed by prominent Sioux City architect William L. Steele. This is the only known farmhouse designed by Steele. The other well-preserved agricultural buildings on an early twentieth-century farmstead are also of significance. Holtze Construction of Sioux City built the house, and it was the first building constructed by the new company. Aaron Gunderson built the dairy barn.
