= St. Rose of Lima Catholic Church and School Complex =

Historic church in Nebraska, United States

- U.S. National Register of Historic Places
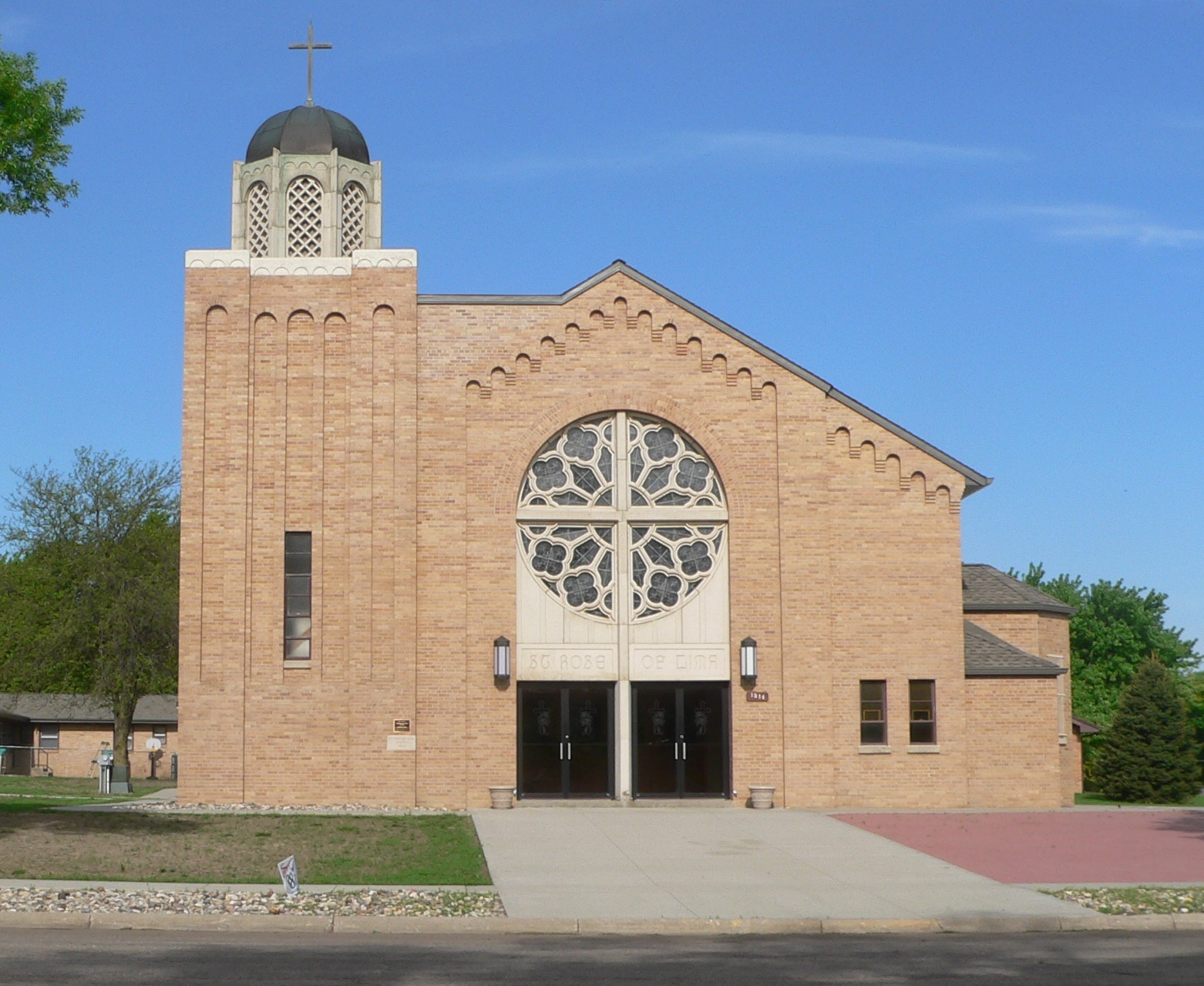

- Location within Nebraska Location within the United States
- Location: 1302-1316 W. 5th St.,Crofton, Nebraska
- Coordinates: 42.72922°N 97.50085°W
- Architect: William L. Steele, et al.
- Architectural style: Renaissance Revival
- NRHP reference No.: 11000106
- Added to NRHP: March 21, 2011

The St. Rose of Lima Catholic Church and School Complex in Crofton in Knox County, Nebraska was listed on the National Register of Historic Places in 2011.

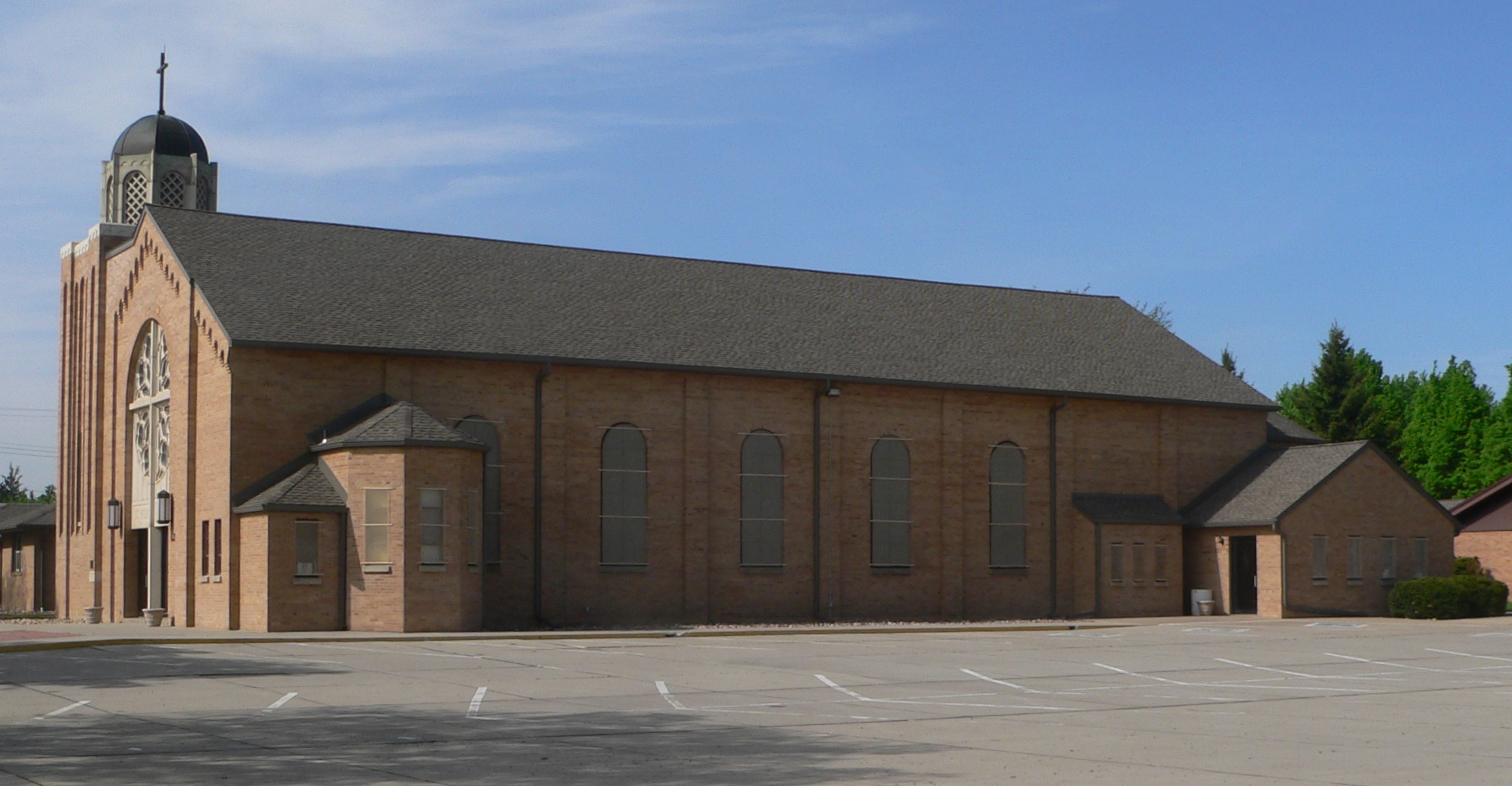

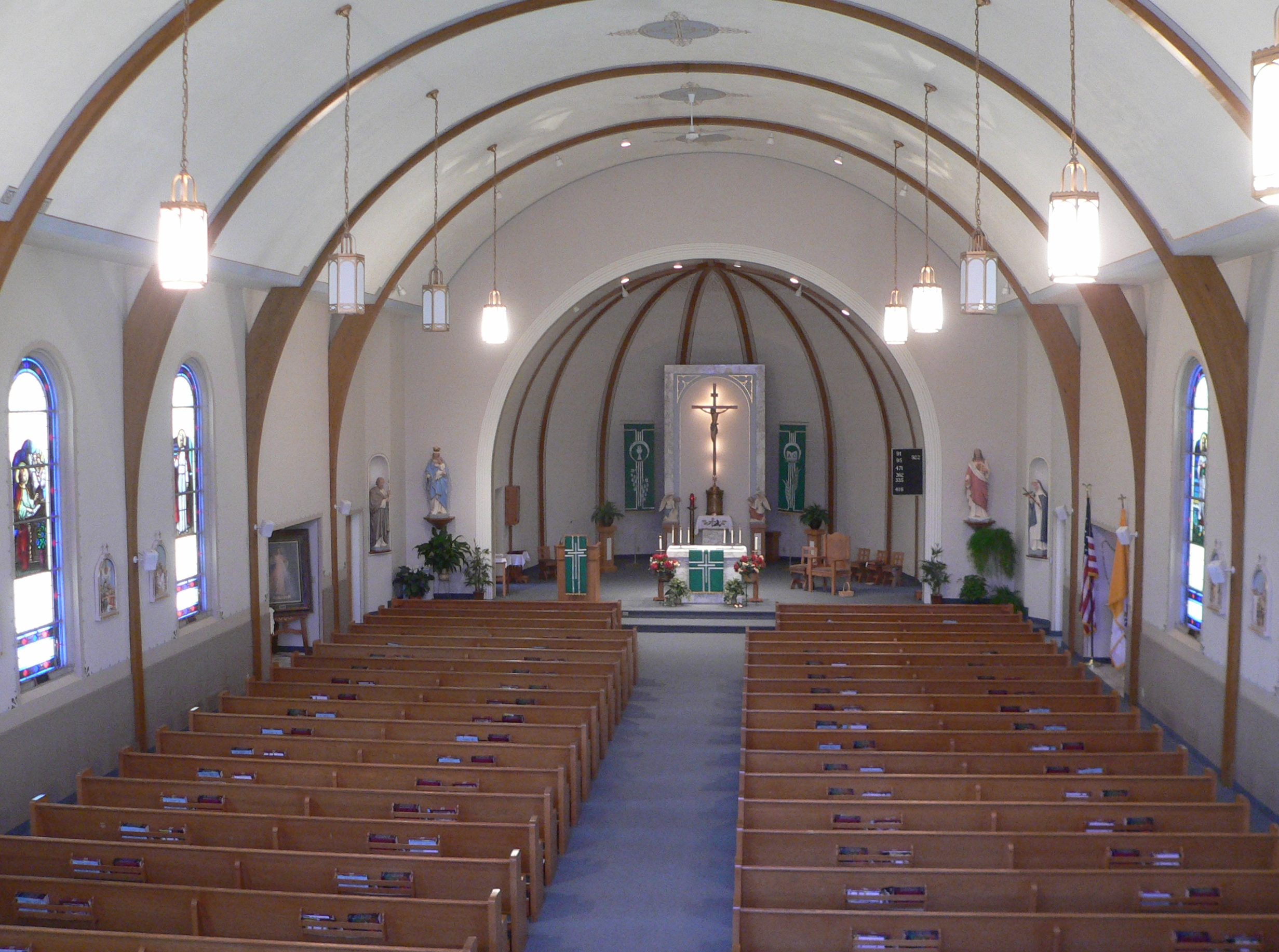

The parish of St. Rose of Lima in Crofton was founded in 1906. Its first building, a frame 88-by-36-foot (27 m × 11 m) structure, was built in 1907 and dedicated January 29, 1908.

The current church building, built of tan buff brick, was built during 1952–53.

Architect William L. Steele, who died in 1949, may be associated with design of the 1953 building, because he is listed in the National Register database coverage for the property, but the registration document is not available online and there is no mention of him in the parish's own history, which credits architect Loftus instead for the 1953 building. General appearance of the 1953 church might be similar to Steele's works, however.
