= Harold A. (H.A.) Doyle House =

- Harold A. (H. A.) Doyle House
- U.S. National Register of Historic Places
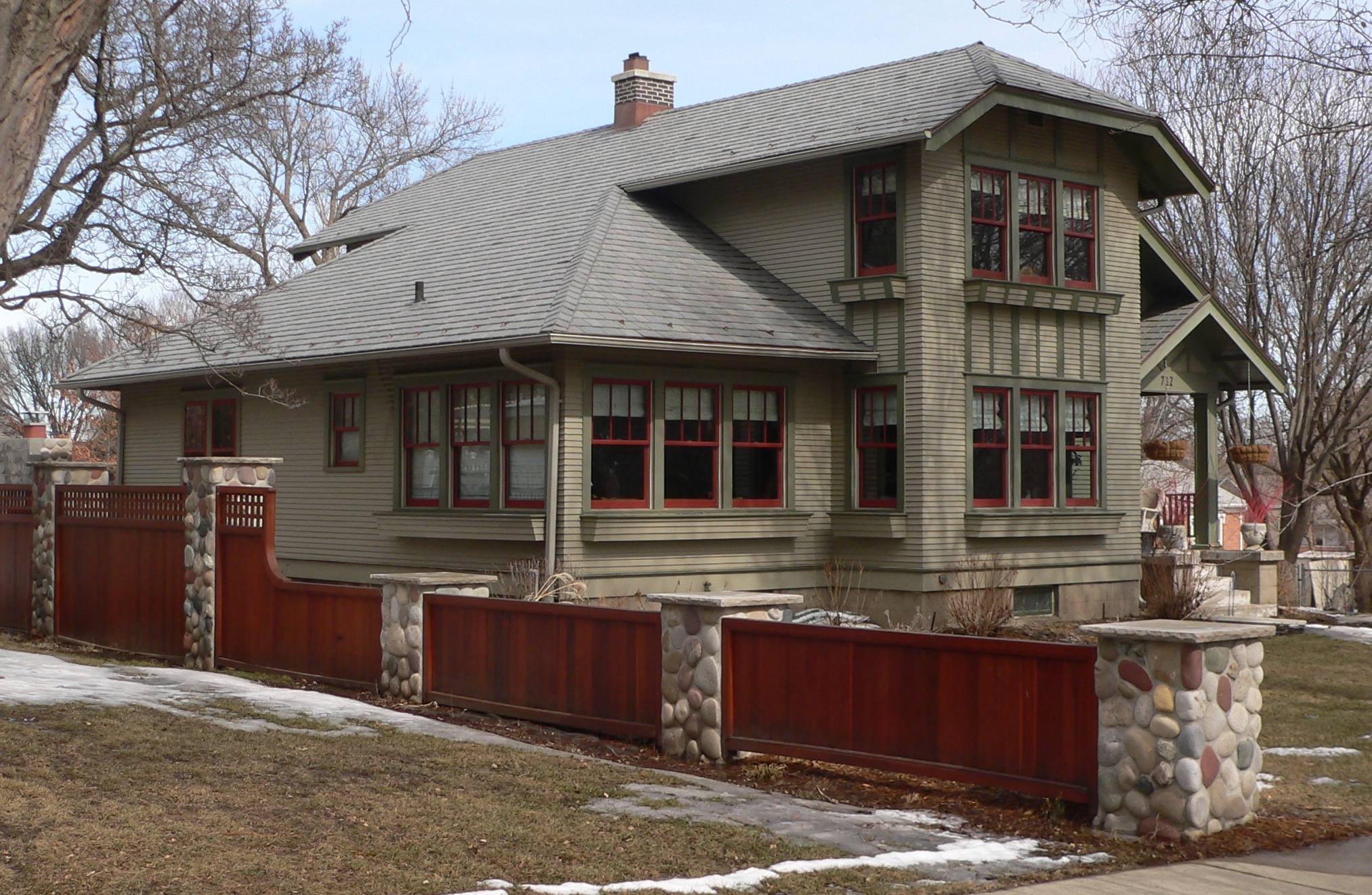
- The house in 2011

- Location within South Dakota Location within the United States
- Location: 712 West Third Street, Yankton, South Dakota
- Coordinates: 42°52′13″N 97°24′08″W
- Area: less than one acre
- Built: 1924
- Architect: William L. Steele
- Architectural style: American Craftsman
- NRHP reference No.: 90001645
- Added to NRHP: October 25, 1990

The Harold A. (H.A.) Doyle House is a historic house in Yankton, South Dakota. It was built in 1924 for Harold A. Doyle, a trial lawyer, and designed in the American Craftsman style by architect William L. Steele. It has been listed on the National Register of Historic Places since October 25, 1990.
