= Sioux City Free Public Library =

- U.S. National Register of Historic Places
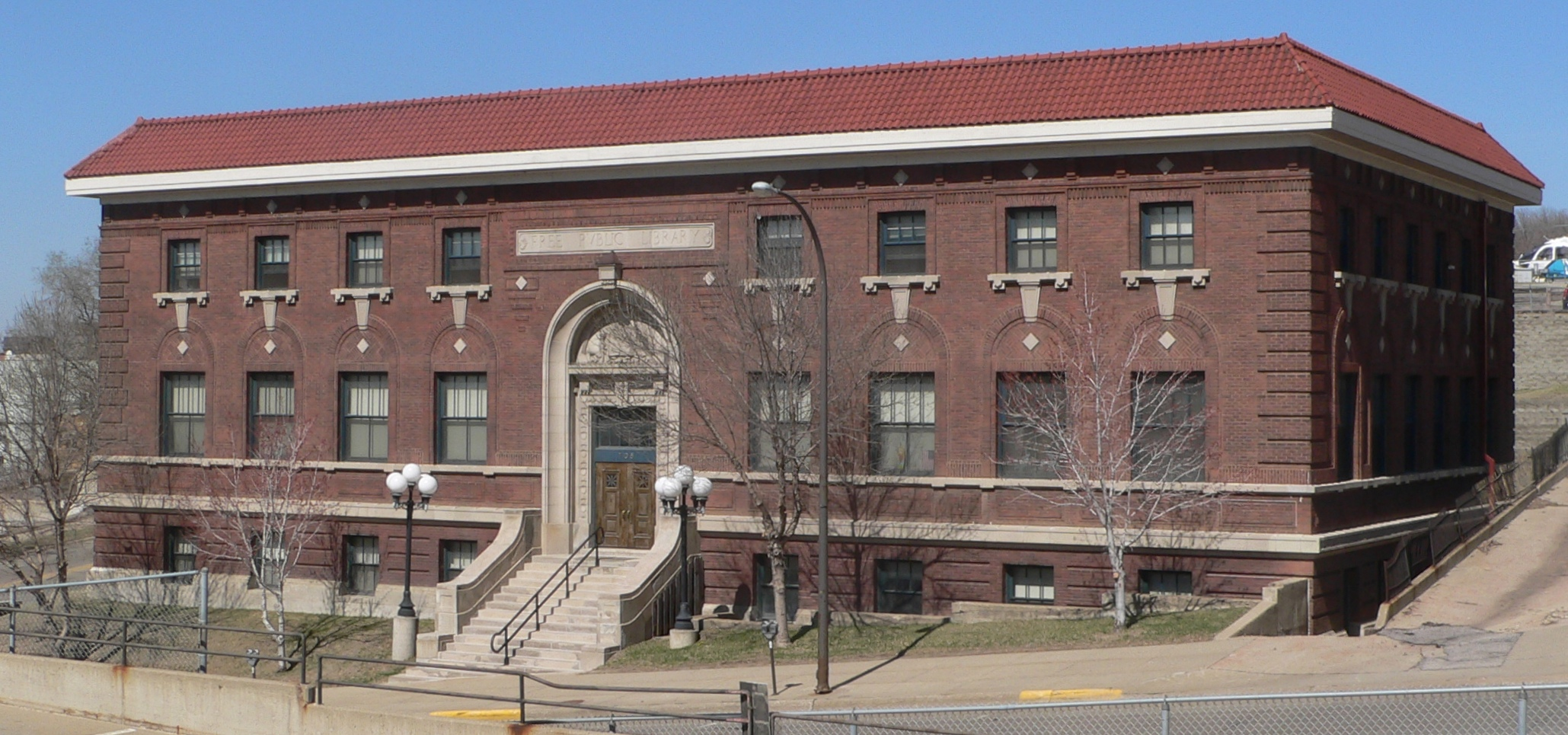

- Location within Iowa Location within the United States
- Location: 705 6th St. Sioux City, Iowa
- Coordinates: 42°29′47.7″N 96°24′5.6″W
- Area: less than one acre
- Built: 1912–1913
- Architect: Edward L. Tilton
- Architectural style: Renaissance Revival
- NRHP reference No.: 97000461
- Added to NRHP: June 2, 1997

The Sioux City Free Public Library is a historic building located in Sioux City, Iowa, United States. The library was located in a section of the Municipal Building, no longer extant, between 1892 and 1913. It had outgrown the space when the Library Board contacted Andrew Carnegie in 1910 about providing the funding for a new library building. Their request was initially turned down. They chose to work with New York City architect Edward L. Tilton, an architect preferred by Carnegie, in place of local architect William L. Steele who was working with the board previously. Local resident George Murphy donated the property for the new building. Meanwhile, Tilton designed the two-story brick Renaissance Revival building. On April 8, 1911, Carnegie approved the project and donated $75,000 for the building's construction. The new building was dedicated on March 6, 1913, and it is considered "an excellent early twentieth century example of the architectural development of library planning and design." It was Tilton's only building in Iowa.

Plans were made to enlarge the building in 1938, but the bond issue failed. The library remained in its cramped quarters until 1989 when it moved into a former bank building downtown. Ownership of the Carnegie building was transferred to a group of investors in 1996 who transformed it into apartments. It was listed on the National Register of Historic Places the following year.
