= Doyle–Benton House =

Historic house in Colorado, United States

- U.S. National Register of Historic Places
- Colorado State Register of Historic Properties
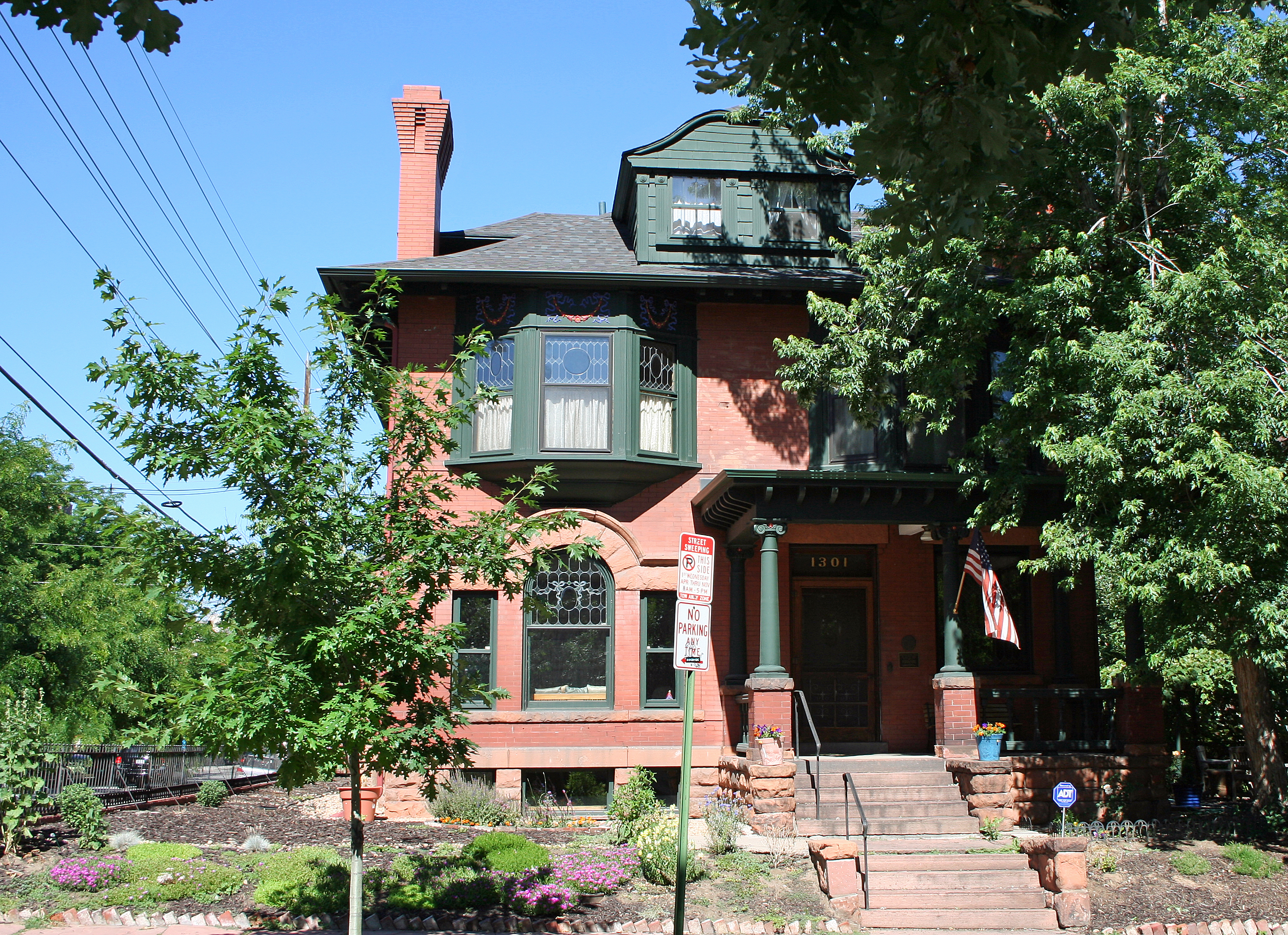
- Front of the house

- Location within Colorado Location within the United States
- Location: 1301 Lafayette St., Denver, Colorado
- Coordinates: 39°44′13″N 104°58′13″W
- Area: less than one acre
- Built: 1896
- Architect: Frank Houck
- NRHP reference No.: 05001527
- CSRHP No.: 5DV.9200
- Added to NRHP: January 18, 2006

The Doyle–Benton House was the former residence of James and Daphne Doyle until 1904, where it was later the residence of Frank Benton and family in 1906 until 1970. Mr. Doyle was the founder of the Portland Gold Mine, which is still producing as part of AngloGold Ashanti’s Cripple Creek and Victor Mining Company on the western slope of Pike’s Peak. Mr. Benton was a prominent cattle rancher on the Western Slope and was one of the founders of the National Western Stock Show.

== History ==
Mr. Doyle was a flamboyant character whose business and personal situations were profiled in great detail in Denver newspapers during the late 1890s and early 1900s. Notwithstanding his troubles, he was clearly a likable individual as evidenced by his reelection as the mayor of Victor, Colorado while he was serving jail time for contempt of court in a business dispute with his partner. Doyle eventually lost both his wife and his fortune in the course of his protracted business litigation and ended up selling the house in 1904 to a dentist named George Schumacker. Schumacker only resided at the Doyle–Benton house for a short period of time – under two years – and then sold the house in 1906 to the Frank Benton family.

The Benton's owned the home for an ensuing 64 years until 1970. The Benton's were prominent cattle ranchers on the Western Slope and Frank was one of the founders of the National Western Stock Show. He was a prolific columnist and writer and authored a book called "Cowboy Life on the Sidetrack", which depicted the difficulties ranchers had in sending their livestock via the Union Pacific railroad to slaughterhouses in the Midwest.

In 1970, Mrs. Frank Benton sold the house to USAF Major Eugene Tehee, Ret., and his wife, Rose Tehee. They owned the house for 34 years during which time they converted the basement, second and third floors to separate apartments while residing on the first floor. In 2004 they sold the house to Tamar Judith Gerber who remodeled it substantially in the Victorian period keeping many of the original features. She also converted the outside two-story carriage house to a separate living residence and was successful at having the house registered as a historical landmark.

== Restoration ==
The home had undergone major modifications sometime during the 1970s, and was converted into four separate apartments with exterior entrances for each room, complete with kitchens. In 2004, restoration efforts were contracted to The Cygnet Group to remove the modifications and restore the structure back to its original appearance with some modern upgrades, while keeping to the original appearance wherever possible.
