= John Doyle House =

- U.S. National Register of Historic Places
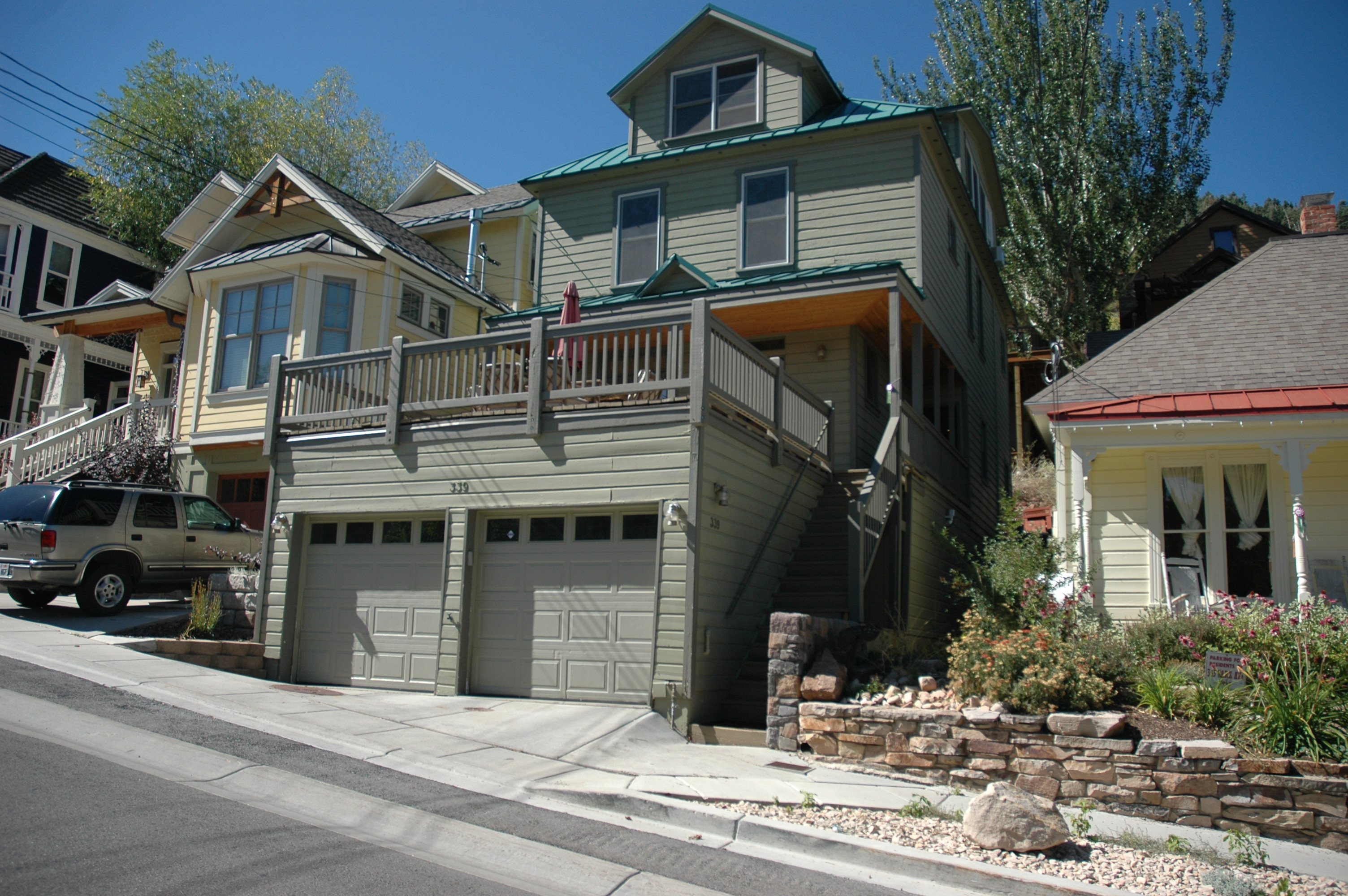

- Location within Utah Location within the United States
- Location: 339 Park Ave., Park City, Utah
- Coordinates: 40°38′32″N 111°29′35″W
- Area: 0.1 acres (0.040 ha)
- Built: 1900
- Architectural style: Two Story Box
- MPS: Mining Boom Era Houses TR
- NRHP reference No.: 86000162
- Added to NRHP: February 6, 1986

The John Doyle House, at 339 Park in the historic mining town of Park City, Utah, was built around 1900.

== Background ==
It is a frame "two story box" house, with a pyramid roof, one of just four in Park City identified in a 1984 study, all four being along Park Avenue.

It was listed on the National Register of Historic Places in 1986.
