= Holy Trinity Greek Orthodox Church (Sioux City, Iowa) =

Greek Orthodox church in Sioux City, Iowa

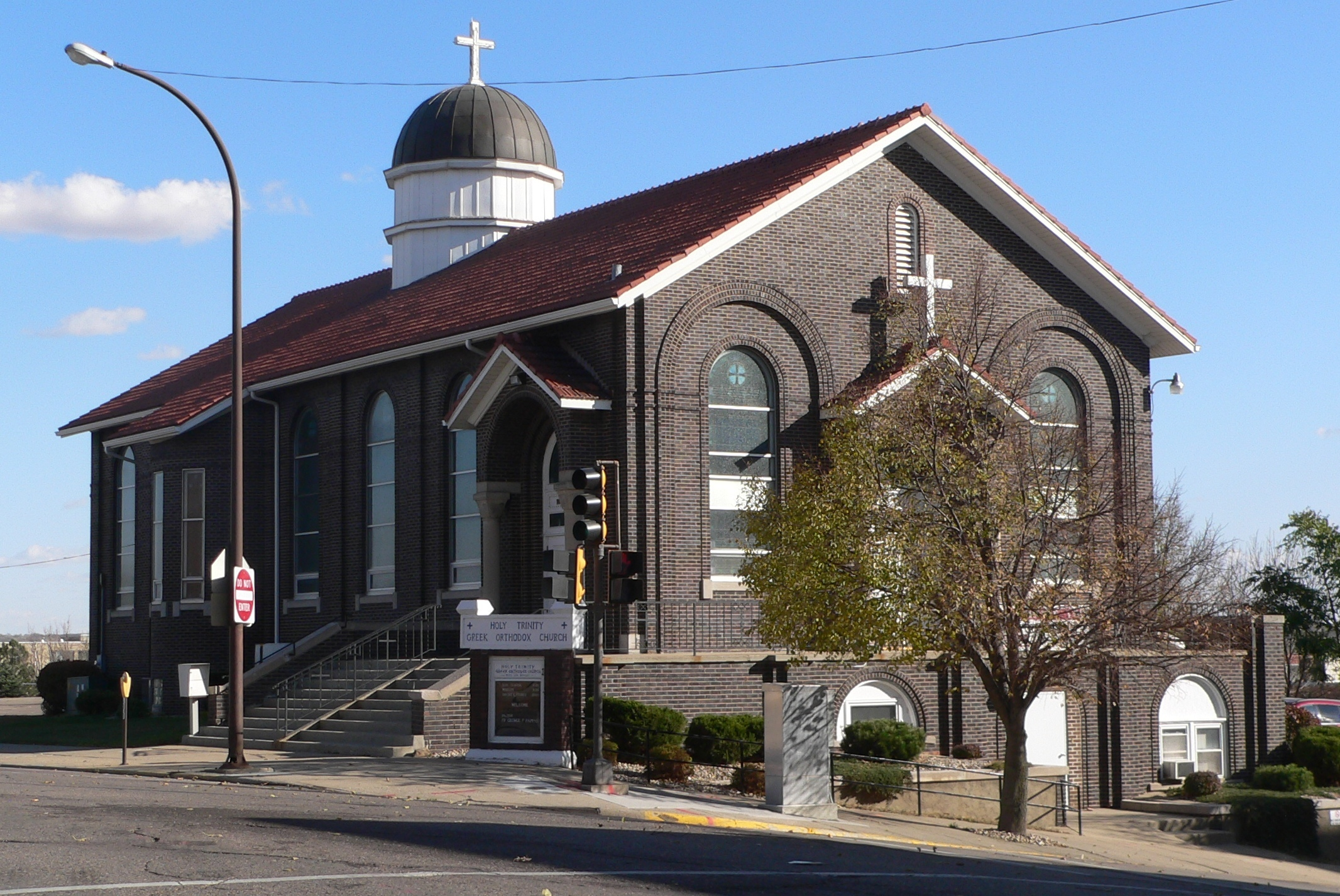
- View from the northwest
- Holy Trinity Greek Orthodox Church
- 42.4961956°N 96.3989239°W
- Location: 900 6th St; Sioux City, Iowa
- Country: United States
- Language(s): English, Greek
- Denomination: Greek Orthodox
- Website: holytrinity.ia.goarch.org

History
- Status: Parish church
- Founded: 1918

Architecture
- Functional status: Active
- Heritage designation: National Register of Historic Places
- Designated: May 1, 1998
- Architect: William L. Steele
- Style: Late 19th and 20th Century Revival
- Years built: 1926

Administration
- Metropolis: Greek Orthodox Metropolis of Chicago
- Archdiocese: Greek Orthodox Archdiocese of America

Clergy
- Bishop: The Most Rev. Metr. Nathanael (Symeonides)
- Rector: The Rev. Fr. Luke Melackrinos
- Holy Trinity Greek Orthodox Church
- U.S. National Register of Historic Places
- NRHP reference No.: 98000381

Holy Trinity Greek Orthodox Church is located in Sioux City, Iowa, United States. Designed by architect William L. Steele, the church building has been listed on the National Register of Historic Places since 1998.

== History ==
Before the founding of Holy Trinity Church in 1918, Greek Orthodox Christians had to travel to Omaha, Nebraska to attend services. Paikos K. Pappaphilipopoulos, who would Americanize his name to "Peter Nelson", led the organization of a church. Their initial meeting was held at a Knights of Columbus Hall. In 1920, the congregation purchased property near the downtown area for US$35,000 (equivalent to US$562,500 in 2025). There was a house on the property that was used as the parish's first church. Father Constantinos Harvelas served as the church's first pastor.

The cornerstone for the present church building was laid in the spring of 1925 and the church was dedicated on 4 October 1925. It is the oldest and largest Orthodox Church building in Iowa. In February 1996, a fire gutted the church's interior. Christ John Kamages FAIA of San Francisco served as architect for the renovation while iconographer Elias Damianakis of Florida and woodcarver Steve Kavroulakis of Crete designed and built a new altar, sanctuary, narthex, iconostasion, and iconography. Metropolitan Iakovos of Krinis rededicated the church in June 1999.
