= David Doyle House No. 2 =

Historic house in Arkansas, United States

- U.S. National Register of Historic Places
- Location within Arkansas Location within the United States
- Location: Jct. of Co. Rd. 953 and AR 5, El Paso, Arkansas
- Coordinates: 35°7′27″N 92°5′40″W
- Area: 2 acres (0.81 ha)
- Built: 1904
- Architectural style: Vernacular T-shaped
- MPS: White County MPS
- NRHP reference No.: 91001302
- Added to NRHP: September 5, 1991

The David Doyle House No. 2 was a historic house at Arkansas Highway 5 and White County Road 953 in El Paso, Arkansas. It was a single-story wood-frame structure built in a T shape, with a cross gable roof configuration and a combination of weatherboard siding and bead-board siding. The latter was found under the hip roof that extended around the western elevation, which included the projecting section of the T. The gable at the western end was decorated with vernacular Folk Victorian woodwork. The house was built about 1904 and was one of the best-preserved examples of this form in the county.

The house was listed on the National Register of Historic Places in 1991. It has been listed as destroyed in the Arkansas Historic Preservation Program database.

== See also ==
- National Register of Historic Places listings in White County, Arkansas
