= Federal Office Building (Omaha, Nebraska) =

Former federal office building in Omaha, Nebraska, U.S.

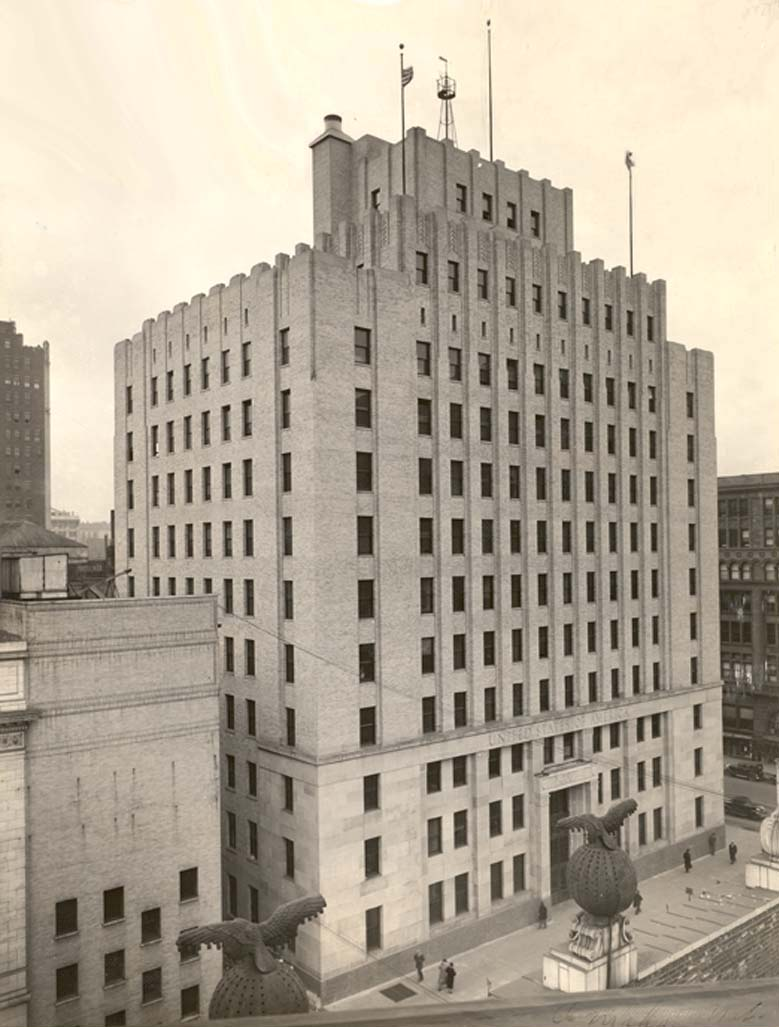
- The Federal Office Building upon completion in 1934
- Interactive map of Federal Office Building

General information
- Type: Hotel
- Location: 106 South 15th Street, Omaha, Nebraska, U.S.
- Coordinates: 41.259472477435914°N 95.93617544983643°W

Technical details
- Floor count: 13

Design and construction
- Architects: Thomas R. Kimball, William L. Steele, Josiah D. Sandham, George B. Prinz.
- Federal Office Building
- Built: 1932–1934
- Architectural style: Stripped classical with Art Deco elements
- Added to NRHP: March 17, 2009

The Federal Office Building, also known as the Old Federal Building, is a thirteen story, stripped classical style building with Art Deco elements located in Downtown Omaha, Nebraska. The building was designed and built from 1932–34 by architects Thomas R. Kimball, William L. Steele, and Josiah D. Sandham as part of the firm Kimball, Steele & Sandham, and associated architect George B. Prinz. It was built on the site of first U.S Courthouse and Post Office. The building was listed on the National Register of Historic Places on March 19, 2009 and was converted into a hotel in 2013.

== History ==
The Federal Office Building was announced in March 1929 to consolidate several agencies into one space. The building received federal approval in February 1931. Later that month, construction was delayed due to opposition to the United States Department of War. Development officially began in May 1931. Site preparation was completed in February 1932 and construction began shortly after. The building was officially dedicated in February 1934.

In 1995, the building was allegedly examined as a target by Timothy McVeigh prior to his involvement in the Oklahoma City Bombing. However, the FBI said there was little evidence to prove that he was in fact in the building.

In July 2008, the US Army Corps of Engineers, the final occupant of the building, moved out of the building. On March 17, 2009, the Federal Office Building was listed on the National Register of Historic Places and was put up for sale.

In December 2011, the building was sold to developers who planned on turning it into a 152-room Residence Inn by Marriott. The $23 million hotel opened to guests in October 2013. In order to keep the building on the NRHP, the exterior facade remains the same, as do some of the original interior features, such as terrazzo marble floors.

== Design ==
The Federal Office Building is 13 stories tall and its architectural style is striped classical with Art Deco elements. The building was designed by Thomas R. Kimball, William L. Steele, and Josiah D. Sandham as part of the firm Kimball, Steele & Sandham, and associated architect George B. Prinz.

== Tenants ==
Part of the New Deal building program, the structure's original occupants were all federal agencies including the US Weather Bureau, the Internal Revenue Service (IRS), the Department of Agriculture, Civil Service Commission, Customs Service, Army, and Navy. The federal District Court for Nebraska met in the building until the late 1950s or early 1960s.

The US Army Corps of Engineers was the last federal agency officed in the building. Since their departure in July 2008, it has not been in use by the federal government. After its sale in 2011, the building is currently a 152-room Residence Inn.
