= Jacinto (disambiguation) =

Jacinto is a masculine given name. It may also refer to:

- Jacinto (surname)
- Jacinto, Minas Gerais, Brazil, a municipality
- Jacinto, California, United States, an unincorporated community
- Jacinto, Mississippi, United States, a census-designated place
- Jacinto, Nebraska, United States, an unincorporated community
- Jacinto-class patrol vessel, a Philippine Navy ship class
- Tropical Storm Nongfa (2025), known in the Philippines as Jacinto
