= Thomas Kimball =

Thomas Kimball may refer to:

- Thomas Lord Kimball (1831–1899), American railroad executive
- Thomas Rogers Kimball (1862–1934), American architect
- Thomas S. Kimball (1862–1939), American politician from Arizona
- Toby Kimball (Thomas Kimball) (1942–2017), American basketball player
