= Omaha Club =

Men-only social club in Nebraska, 1883–2000

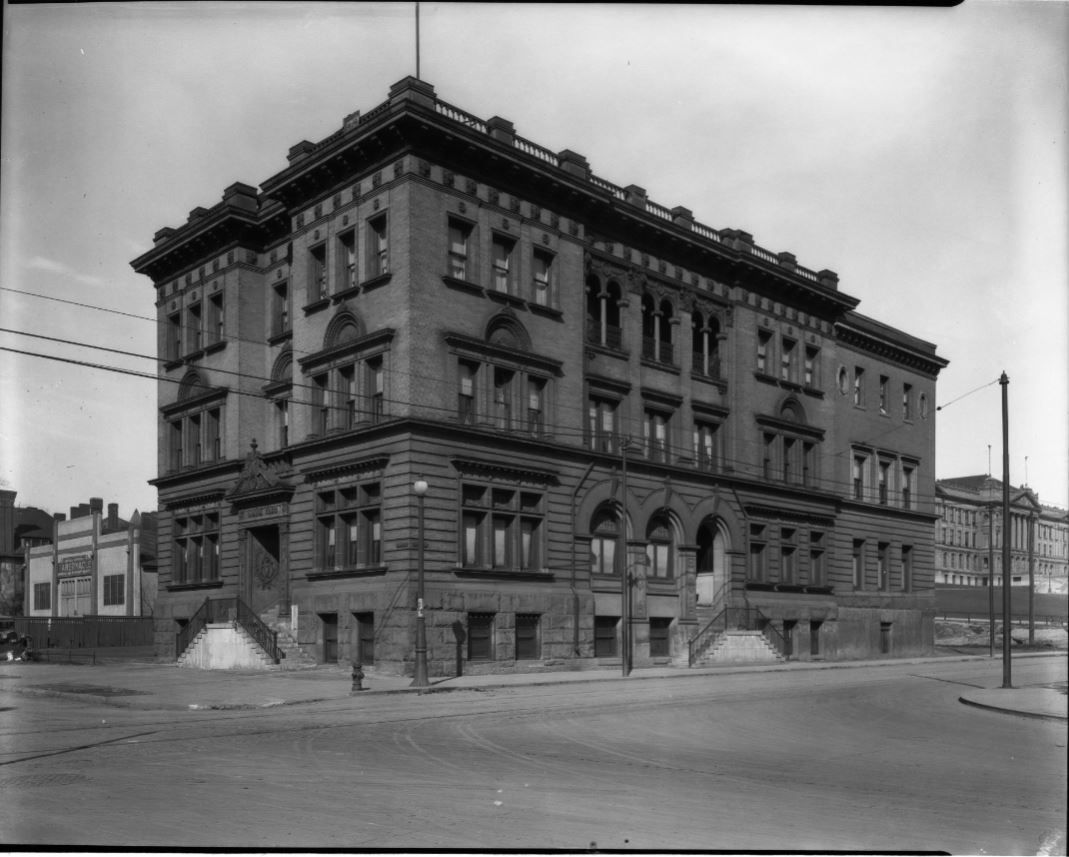
- The Omaha Club building, designed by architect Thomas Rogers Kimball (1895)
- Formation: 1883; 143 years ago
- Dissolved: 2000
- Type: Social club
- Legal status: Incorporated 1883
- Headquarters: Downtown Omaha
- Location: 2002 Douglas Street, Omaha, NE
- Key people: John A Creighton, Edward Cudahy, John Lee Webster, William Paxton, Thomas Lord Kimball, George Ward Holdrege, and Henry W Yates

The Omaha Club was established in 1883 by business and professional men as a private male-only social club. After several temporary locations, the first permanent building, an Italian Renaissance design by architect Thomas Rogers Kimball was opened on New Year's Day 1895 at the northwest corner of 20th and Douglas Streets. Women were only allowed through a side door and restricted to a subdued ladies’ dining room. In 1965, after a vote where 85% of the membership approved, "The Little Old Lady of Douglas Street" was torn down. It was replaced in 1966 with a Leo A Daly modernist design.

== History ==
At the turn of the 20th century, the Omaha Club was the most historically significant social club in the City of Omaha, having entertained many prominent guests including Winfield Scott Schley, Fitzhugh Lee, and John Coalter Bates.

=== Architectural features ===
The Omaha Club building was three stories in height plus a basement and constructed of St Louis cream-colored brick with terra cotta trim. A billiard room, library, and reading room were in the basement. The upper floors featured large dining areas, private apartments, and an outdoor smoking terrace. The finishes were exquisite. Lavatories and floors were laid in Carrara marble. Wainscoting in the main dining room was of old cherry and sycamore wood. Three private dining rooms were finished in solid cherry, gum wood, and red birch. The third floor held ten sleeping rooms for use by members who desired to make their homes at the club.

=== Presidential visits ===
Five U.S. Presidents dined or registered at the club during their appearances in Omaha. From October 11 through October 13, 1898, the Omaha Club became the “Omaha White House” when President William McKinley and his party accepted an invitation to attend the Trans-Mississippi and International Exposition., Theodore Roosevelt stayed at the club on April 27, 1903, only three days after dedicating the Roosevelt Arch on April 24. While dining at the club during his one-day visit on September 20, 1909, William Howard Taft made a special request for a truce in a contentious strike by street railway employees. Appearing before the American Legion convention in Omaha on October 6, 1925, President Calvin Coolidge protested against "militarism" and urged, "tolerance in American life and regard for differences in creeds, races and religions." Nebraska's only native to become president of the United States Gerald R. Ford personally dedicated his birth site to the people of Omaha on September 21, 1977, followed by dinner with civic leaders at the Omaha Club.

== Membership ==
Gurdon Wallace Wattles, an early Omaha businessman, banker, and civic leader, permanently relocated his family to "Jualita", their California estate, in January 1922. However, he maintained a sleeping room at the club for his frequent return visits, where he tended to business affairs.

In 1968, member Warren Buffett successfully ended the Omaha Club’s long-standing policy of excluding Jews by sponsoring his friend, Herman Goldstein. Once Goldstein was voted in, "the long-standing religious barrier to membership there finally toppled." Buffett singlehandedly effected what was perhaps, "the most significant organizational change since its founding in one of Omaha's most elite institutions."

== Demise ==
Financial burdens and competition from exclusive membership golf courses prompted the downtown club’s dwindling constituents to approve dissolution on January 20, 2000. The building was sold to Locher, Cellilli, Pavelka & Dostal LLC law firm effective July 1, 2001.
