= IVY Hotel + Residences =

Skyscraper in Minneapolis, Minnesota, U.S.

Hotel Ivy + Residences
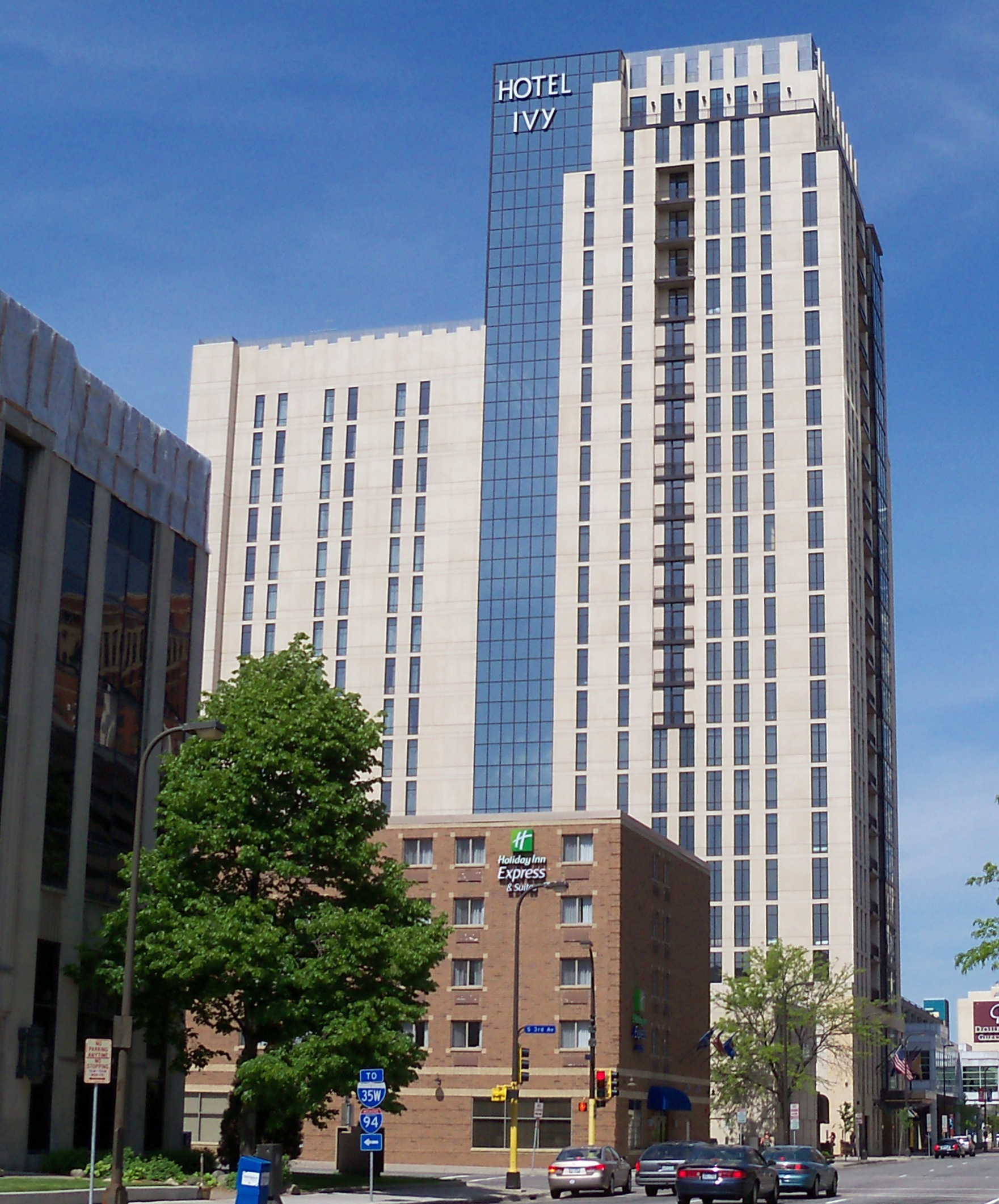
- Hotel Ivy + Residences in May 2010.
- Interactive map of the Hotel Ivy + Residences area
- Former names: Second Church of Christ, Scientist, Minneapolis (1929–1965); Ivy Tower (1965–2007)

General information
- Architectural style: Art Deco (original); Postmodern (current structure)
- Location: Minneapolis, Minnesota, 1115 2nd Avenue South (Hotel Ivy is 201 11th Street So)
- Coordinates: 44°58′17″N 93°16′22″W
- Construction started: 1927 (original)
- Completed: 1930 (original)
- Renovated: 2006–2008 (current structure)

Height
- Height: 140 ft (43 m) (original); 302 ft (92 m) (current structure)

Technical details
- Floor count: 10 (original); 25 (current structure)
- Floor area: 14,914 sq ft (1,385.6 m^{2}) (original); 1,040,925 sq ft (96,705.1 m^{2}) (current structure)

Design and construction
- Architects: Thomas R. Kimball, William L. Steele, and Josiah D. Sandham (original)
- Architecture firm: Kimball, Steele, and Sandham

Renovating team
- Renovating firm: Walsh Bishop Associates (current structure)

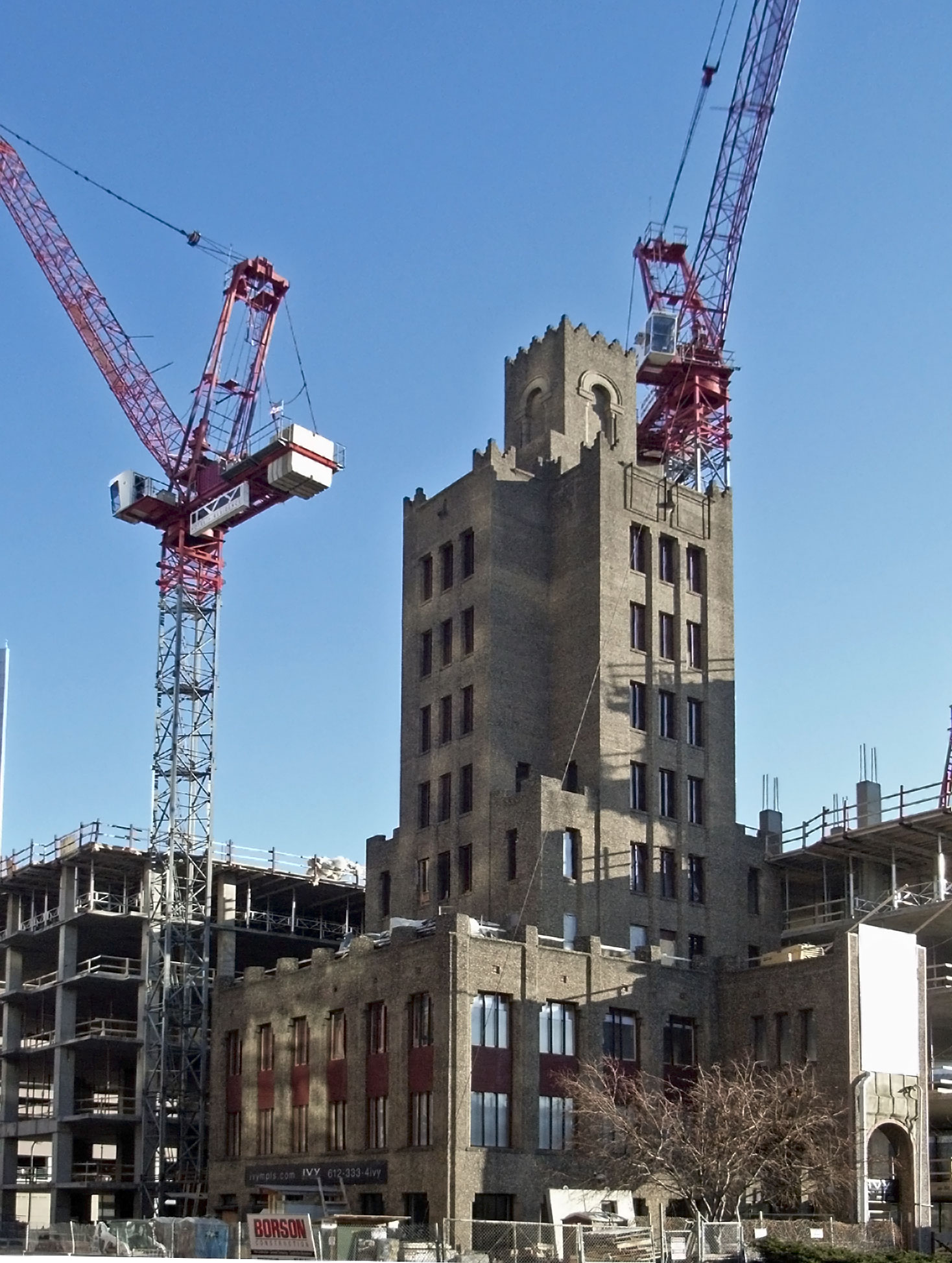
In December 2006, the historic Ivy Tower (originally the Second Church of Christ Scientist) was being incorporated into what would become the Hotel Ivy + Residences.

Hotel Ivy + Residences, which integrates the historic Ivy Tower, is a 302-foot (92 m) skyscraper in Minneapolis, Minnesota. It was completed in summer of 2008 and has 25 floors, 6 elevators and 136 hotel rooms and 91 residential units.

The Hotel Ivy is the official hotel of every NHL, NBA, MLB, and NFL team that plays in the Twin Cities. It is part of The Luxury Collection of Marriott International. It is colloquially referred to as The Saint Paul Hotel by autograph seekers and hockey fans alike. The building integrates the historic Ivy Tower, which was originally built in 1930 as the Second Church of Christ Scientist for the Church of Christ, Scientist. Designed by Thomas R. Kimball, the older structure features a Mesopotamian style as a rare example of the Ziggurat form of architecture in Minneapolis. Designed as a small-scale "skyscraper", it originally housed administrative offices, classrooms, and reading rooms and was intended to be the first phase of what would be four towers surrounding a main church building. The plan was abandoned and the tower subsequently sold in 1965, when it became known as the Ivy Tower.

In 1986, the Minneapolis City Council's Zoning and Planning Committee voted to affirm the recommendation of historic designation.

The building sat vacant for several years until it, as well as the surrounding parcel of land were chosen for redevelopment as a combined luxury hotel/condominium complex as part of The Luxury Collection brand; the project cost $88 million.

With the Ivy Tower as a component, the new complex opened in 2008 as the Hotel Ivy + Residences, including a 136-room hotel and 70 condominiums. The older building was remodeled to include several single-floor hotel rooms and a two-level suite furnished with a baby grand piano priced at $3,000 a night. The condominiums, most of them initially priced at more than $1 million, included full use of the hotel's amenities, like the food, valet and maid service and the 17,000-square-foot (1,600 m^{2}) spa.

The complex struggled from the beginning: it was finished behind schedule and subsequently struggled financially due to the Great Recession. The building soon went into receivership and, by November 2009, had only sold 21 of its condos. By December 2009, the developers, Jeff Laux and Gary Benson, still owed $56 million on $69 million in loans and almost $9 million in mechanic's liens as one of its lenders sought foreclosure on the property.

In April 2013, a deal to sell the hotel to Ameriprise Financial fell through.

In December 2013, Heartland Investors acquired the hotel.

== See also ==
- List of tallest buildings in Minneapolis
