= Harley J. Earl Trophy =

Award given to the winner of the Daytona 500 auto race

- Awarded for: Winning the Daytona 500
- Location: Daytona Beach, Florida
- Country: United States
- Presented by: NASCAR
- First award: 1959
- Currently held by: Tyler Reddick
- Website: http://www.daytonainternationalspeedway.com/Tickets-Events/Events/2011/DAYTONA-500/DAYTONA-500.aspx

The Harley J. Earl Trophy is the trophy presented to the winner of the premier – and season-opening – event of the National Association for Stock Car Auto Racing (NASCAR), the Daytona 500. It is named after influential automobile designer Harley Earl, who served as the second commissioner of NASCAR. Earl is arguably best known as the "inventor of the Corvette" and designer of the Firebird I prototype that adorns the trophy. The trophy is kept on display at the Daytona International Speedway, while a small replica is given to each Daytona 500 winner.

== Description and history ==
The Harley J. Earl Trophy is named after General Motors car designer Harley Earl. Earl, the second commissioner of NASCAR, was the designer of the Chevrolet Corvette; his Firebird I concept car provides the basis of the automobile that sits atop the trophy; the car is often misidentified as Malcolm Campbell's "Blue Bird" land speed record car. Earl was a friend of NASCAR founder Bill France Sr., who named the trophy after him as a sign of respect.

The trophy is awarded to the winner of the annual Daytona 500, known as "The Great American Race", which acts as the season-opening event for the NASCAR Cup Series, and is also considered the most prestigious and important event on the NASCAR schedule. The trophy is considered to be the most coveted award with which a NASCAR driver can be presented.

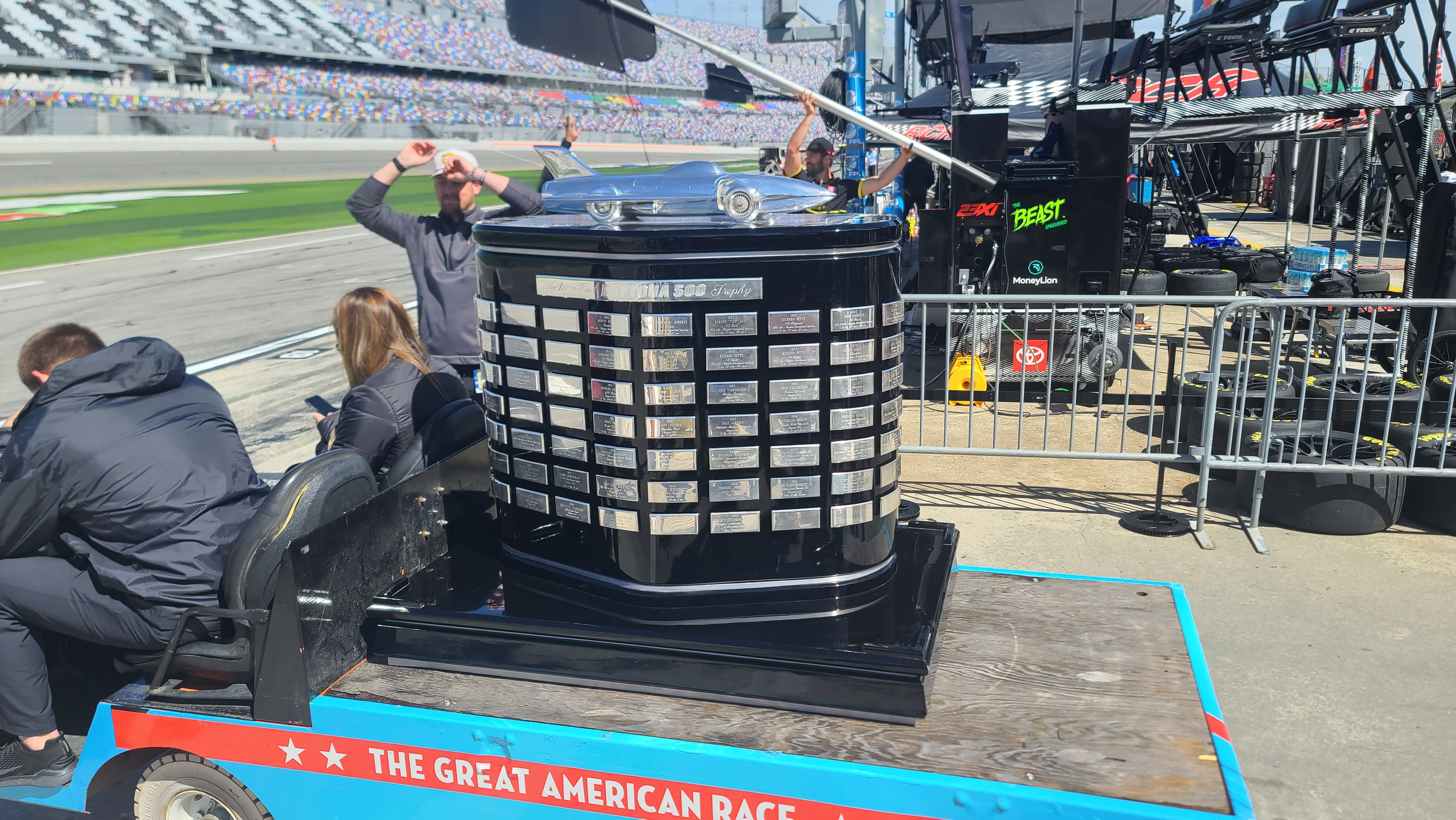
The Harley J. Earl Perpetual Trophy, trackside, at Daytona International Speedway prior to the running of the 2024 Daytona 500.

The Harley J. Earl Perpetual Trophy, the "official" version of the award, is housed at the Daytona International Speedway. It stands about four feet (1.2 m) tall, five feet (1.5 m) wide and is in the same triangular "tri-oval" shape of Daytona International Speedway. It's removed from its display once a year to appear in victory lane with the winner of the Daytona 500. In 2010, the trophy was removed from the Daytona International Speedway, transported to the Indianapolis Motor Speedway and put on display alongside the Borg-Warner Trophy – awarded to the winner of the Indianapolis 500 – in the Indianapolis Motor Speedway Museum during the Indianapolis 500 race week.

== The Trophy and the Award ==
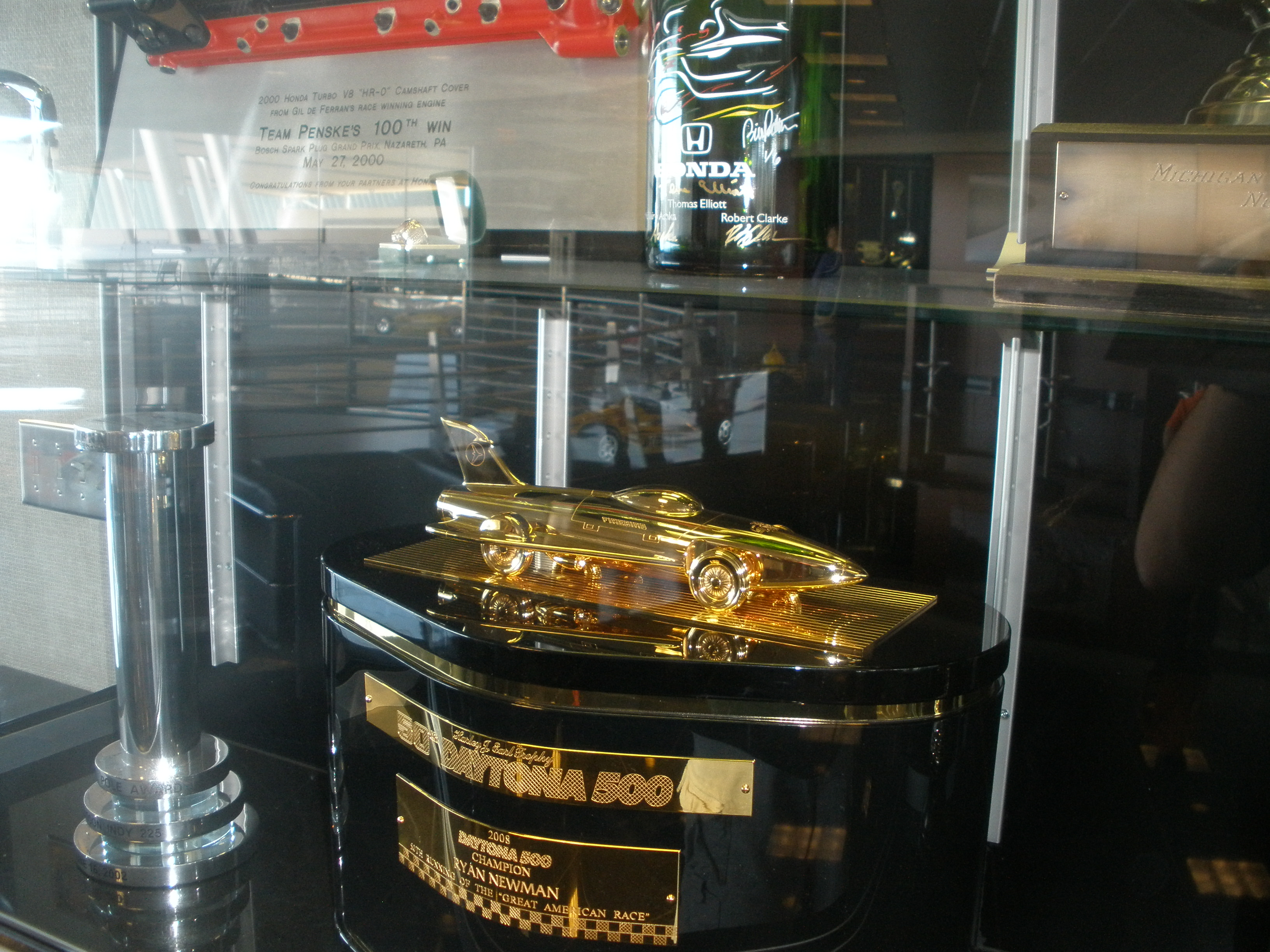
2008 gold-plated trophy.

Winners of the Daytona 500 through 1997 received the Harley Earl Award, a wooden trophy approximately three feet (0.91 m) tall, adorned with silver figurines. Starting in 1998, to celebrate the 40th running, individual winners of the Daytona 500 have been presented with a miniature replica of the Harley J. Earl Trophy, which was recreated by John Lajba, a sculptor from Omaha, Nebraska. Previously commissioned to craft a sculpture of Bill France and his wife, Ann France, for display in front of NASCAR corporate headquarters in Daytona Beach, Florida, Lajba's work on each replica trophy requires six weeks of 12-hour days to create the Firebird I automobile, with all the work done by hand, at Herman Engraving, before it gets plated in silver by Koley’s Inc., also located in Omaha. The first replica trophy, won in 1998 by Dale Earnhardt was mounted on a marble base, but subsequent trophies have since been mounted to an acrylic base, making them lighter. For the 2008 Daytona 500, the 50th anniversary of the first race, the replica of the trophy, presented to winner Ryan Newman, was plated in gold rather than silver.

The replica trophies weigh 54 pounds (24 kg), measures 18 inches (46 cm) tall, 22 inches (56 cm) wide and 12 inches (30 cm) deep.

=== Additional Daytona 500 trophies ===
The Harley J. Earl Trophy is not the only trophy awarded at the conclusion of the annual Daytona 500. The crew chief of the winning team receives the Erwin "Cannonball" Baker Trophy, named after the first commissioner of NASCAR; the winning team owner is awarded the Governor's Cup.

=== Winners of the Harley J. Earl Trophy ===
The most Harley Earl Awards and Harley J. Earl Trophy Replicas have been won by Richard Petty, often referred to as "The King" of NASCAR. Petty's seven victories lead the four Daytona 500 wins of Cale Yarborough, and three each by Bobby Allison, Dale Jarrett, Jeff Gordon, and Denny Hamlin. Bill Elliott, Sterling Marlin, Michael Waltrip, Jimmie Johnson, Matt Kenseth, Dale Earnhardt Jr., and William Byron have won the Daytona 500 and Harley J. Earl Trophy twice; twenty-seven other drivers have been awarded the trophy once. As of 2026, Trevor Bayne was the youngest winner of the trophy when he won it at age 20 years, 1 day in 2011; Bobby Allison was the oldest winner (50 years, 2 months, 11 days) in 1988.
