= Nebraska Hall of Fame =

Hall of fame located in the Nebraska State Capitol

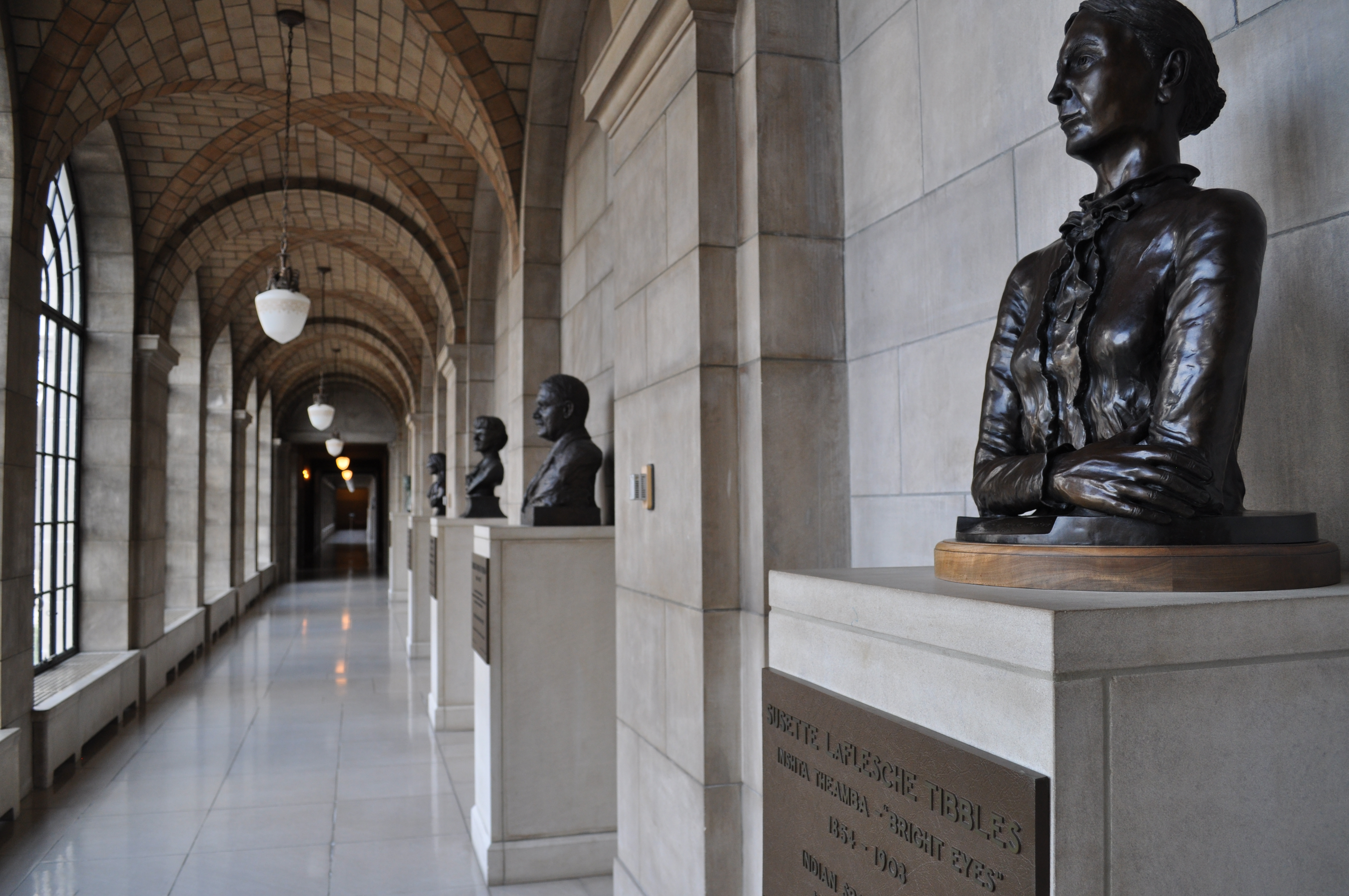
- Northwest courtyard corridor of Nebraska Hall of Fame, Nebraska State Capitol, Second Floor
- Established: June 22, 1961
- Location: Nebraska State Capitol

The Nebraska Hall of Fame officially recognizes prominent individuals from the State of Nebraska. Twenty-seven busts located on the second floor of the Nebraska State Capitol commemorate members of the Hall of Fame. Nebraska Medal of Honor recipients are also members of the Nebraska Hall of Fame. A plaque with the names of Medal of Honor recipients is located in Memorial Chamber—the fourteenth floor of the capitol.

== History ==
On May 23, 1961, the family of U.S. Senator George W. Norris gave a bust of Norris to the State of Nebraska. In celebration of the centenary of his birth, the state placed the Norris bust in the southeast niche of the Great Hall of the capitol. One month later, the Nebraska State Legislature established the Nebraska Hall of Fame and the Nebraska Hall of Fame Commission. The commission chose Norris as the first member on November 21, 1961. The state permitted the commission to use the Norris bust in the capitol as the senator's statuary representation in the hall of fame.

On June 6, 1961, the Nebraska State Legislature also accepted a bust of John G. Neihardt and resolved to permanently place it "in one of the niches in the corridors of the State Capitol." The state dedicated the Neihardt bust on December 7, 1961, and placed it in a large niche above the landing of the northeast stairwell. On April 3, 1962, the state moved the Neihardt bust to the southwest niche of the Great Hall (across from the Norris bust) after protests pronounced that the bust's previous location was improper. On March 21, 1974, the Nebraska Hall of Fame Commission elected Neihardt to the hall of fame, and the commission grandfathered his bust into its statuary collection at the capitol.

The commission dedicated the bust of William Frederick Cody on June 12, 1969, and placed his bust in the last of the six niches of the Great Hall. The commission placed subsequent busts on limestone plinths throughout the second floor courtyard hallways to the north and south of the legislative chambers.

=== Selection criteria ===
In 1961, the Nebraska State Legislature provided fundamental selection criteria for membership to the Nebraska Hall of Fame. The legislature stated that the purpose of the hall is to "bring to public attention and to recognize officially those people who, in their lives, have achieved prominence and who were outstanding Nebraskans." The legislature further stated that "Nebraskans" mean individuals "(1) who were born in Nebraska, (2) who gained prominence while living in Nebraska, or (3) who lived in Nebraska and whose residence in Nebraska was an important influence on their lives and which contributed to their greatness."

The 1961 legislature also provided that "the Nebraska Hall of Fame Commission shall not name more than two persons to the Nebraska Hall of Fame during the first two years after [June 22, 1961], and not more than one person each two years thereafter." Further, the legislature required that an inductee be deceased.

In 1976, the Nebraska State Legislature amended statutes and provided that four members may be named to the hall of fame in celebration of the United States Bicentennial. The legislature also stipulated that individuals shall be deceased at least ten years before being named to the hall of fame.

Finally in 1998, the Nebraska State Legislature again amended statutes and provided that, beginning January 1, 2000, no more than one member may be named to the hall of fame every five years. Additionally, the legislature stipulated that individuals shall be deceased at least thirty-five years before being named to the hall of fame.

== Members ==
Member	Inducted	Bust	Original Composition of Bust	Sculptor	Note of achievement
George W. Norris	1961		1942	Jo Davidson	Nebraska U.S. Congressman (1903–13); Nebraska U.S. Senator (1913–43).
Willa Cather	1962		1962	Paul Swan	Nebraska novelist.
John J. Pershing	1963		1921	Bryant Baker	Commanding General, American Expeditionary Forces, Europe, World War I (1917–18); U.S. Army Chief of Staff (1921–24).
Edward J. Flanagan	1965		1967	Paul Granlund	Founder of Boys Town.
William Frederick Cody (Buffalo Bill)	1967		1891	Anton Friedrich Scholl	Soldier, buffalo hunter, Army scout, actor, rancher, and showman of the West.
William Jennings Bryan	1971		1905	William Whitney Manatt	U.S. Secretary of State (1913–15); Nebraska U.S. Congressman (1891–95); three-time Democratic candidate for President of the United States (1896, 1900, 1908).
Bess Streeter Aldrich	1971		1973	Herman Albert Becker	Nebraska novelist.
John Neihardt	1974		1956	Mona Neihardt	Poet of the West, historian, philosopher, and friend of the American Indian. Named Nebraska Poet Laureate in 1921.
Julius Sterling Morton	1975		1896	Rudolph Evans	Founder of Arbor Day; U.S. Secretary of Agriculture (1893–97); legislator, and Territorial Secretary of Nebraska (1858–61).
Grace Abbott	1976		1978	James T. Olsen	Social reformer and social worker.
Mari Sandoz	1976		1980	Mary Bryan Forsyth	Nebraska biographer, historian, and novelist.
Roscoe Pound	1976		1981	Avard Fairbanks	Botanist, pioneer ecologist, lawyer, and legal educator.
Standing Bear (Ponca: Maⁿchú-Naⁿzhíⁿ)	1977		1980	Ted Long	Ponca chief; successfully argued in U.S. District Court in 1879 in Omaha that Native Americans are "persons within the meaning of the law" and have the right of habeas corpus, thus becoming the first Native American judicially granted civil rights under American law.
Robert W. Furnas	1980		1982	Tom Palmerton	Newspaperman, soldier, historian, and second Governor of Nebraska (1873–75).
Edward Creighton	1982		1983	Phyllis Aspen	Telegraph pioneer and banker.
Susette LaFlesche Tibbles (Omaha: Inshata Theumba, "Bright Eyes")	1983		1984	Deborah S. Wagner-Ashton	Omaha Indian educator; speaker and writer for American Indian rights.
Gilbert M. Hitchcock	1984		1985	George Lundeen	Founder of the Omaha World-Herald; Nebraska U.S. Senator (1911–23).
Loren Eiseley	1986		1987	Kappy Wells	Anthropologist, poet, and philosopher of science.
Hartley Burr Alexander	1988		1990	Tom Palmerton	Anthropologist, poet, philosopher, educator, and authority on North American Indian mythology. Thematic consultant to the Nebraska State Capitol.
Arthur Weimar Thompson	1990		1992	Bryant Baker	"Dean of American Auctioneers."
Dwight P. Griswold	1993		1994	George Lundeen	Banker, publisher, and twenty-fifth Governor of Nebraska (1941–47).
Nathan J. Gold	1996		1997	George Lundeen	Businessman, civic leader, philanthropist, and Nebraska booster.
Red Cloud (Lakota: Maȟpíya Lúta)	2000		2001	Jim Brothers	Oglala Lakota leader.
Charles Edwin Bessey	2007		2009	Littleton Alston	Botanist and chancellor of the University of Nebraska.
Alvin Saunders Johnson	2012		2014	Wesley Wofford	Economist and founder of The New School.
Thomas Rogers Kimball	2017		2019	John Lajba	Omaha architect.
Malcolm X	2022		2024	Nathan Murray	Human rights activist.

== Medal of Honor Recipients ==
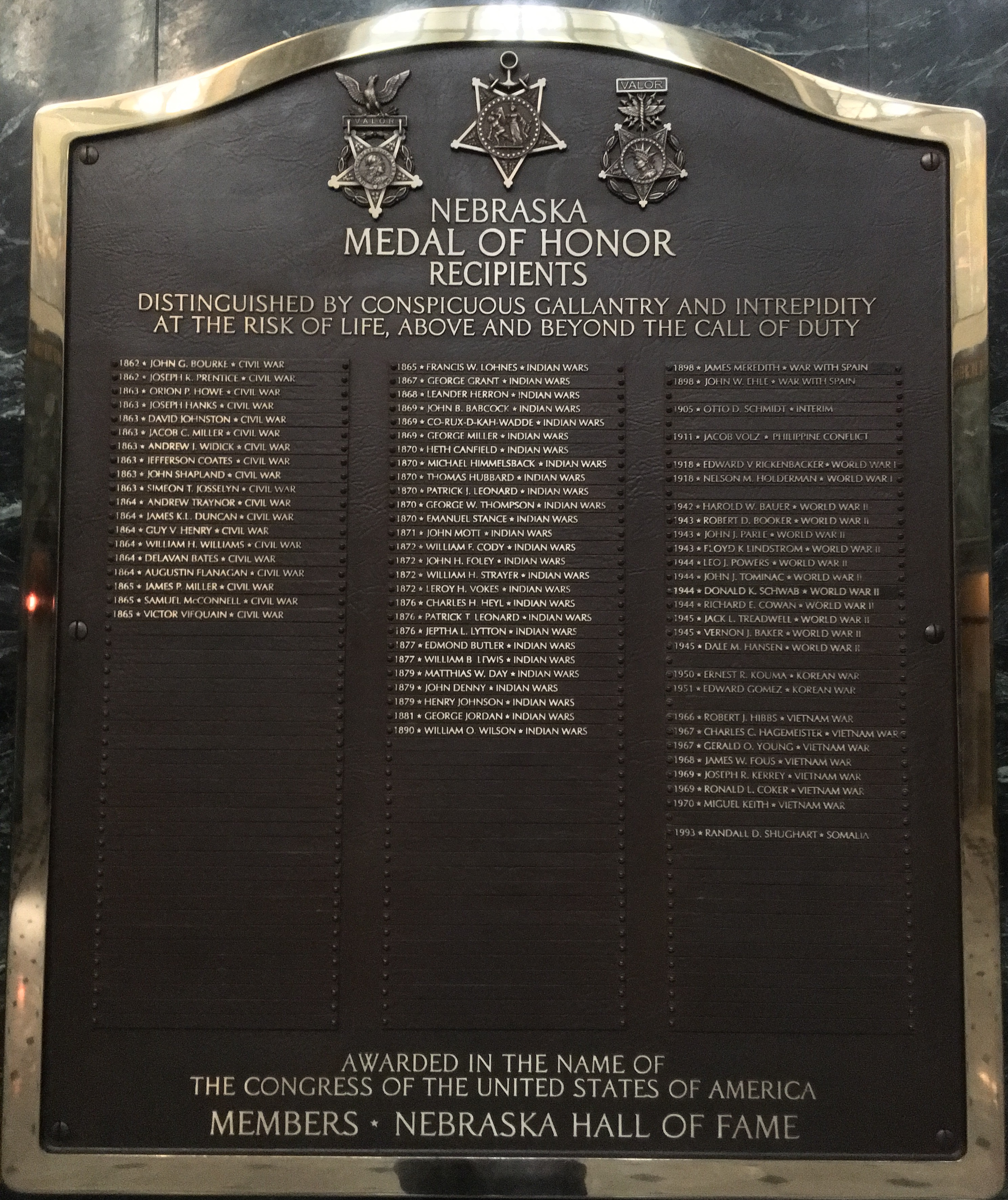
Nebraska Medal of Honor Plaque, Nebraska Hall of Fame, Nebraska State Capitol, Memorial Chamber

In 1969, the Nebraska State Legislature amended the Nebraska Hall of Fame statutes "to provide that Nebraskans awarded the Medal of Honor shall be named to the Hall of Fame" and required that the Hall of Fame Commission procure a plaque with the names of the Medal of Honor recipients. On May 5, 1974, the State of Nebraska officially inducted 57 Nebraska Medal of Honor recipients to the Nebraska Hall of Fame. The commission placed a bronze plaque by J.H. Matthews on the southwest pilaster of the Great Hall of the Nebraska State Capitol.

On November 11, 2013, the State of Nebraska unveiled a new, updated bronze plaque with the names of 72 Nebraska Medal of Honor recipients. The Nebraska Office of the Capitol Commission placed the new plaque in Memorial Chamber—the fourteenth floor of the capitol.

== Controversy ==
In spring 2004, the Nebraska Hall of Fame Commission created controversy when it considered naming U.S. Senator Kenneth S. Wherry or Malcolm X to the hall of fame. Critics of Wherry said he was an inappropriate inductee because of his "crusade to root out homosexuals in government" during his tenure in Congress at the height of McCarthyism. Critics of Malcolm X said he was an inappropriate inductee because he only lived in Nebraska for a few months after his birth in Omaha. On April 27, 2004, the commission selected Wherry over Malcolm X on a four-three vote.

By June 2004, however, the commission realized its selection was in violation of state law. Statute dictated that the commission should not name more than one individual to the hall of fame between January 1, 2000, and December 31, 2004. The commission had previously named Red Cloud a hall-of-famer on January 20, 2000.

The commission subsequently selected Malcolm X for the hall of fame on September 12, 2022. His bust was unveiled on May 22, 2024.
