= John Lajba =

American sculptor

- Known for: Sculptor
- Notable work: Harley J. Earl Trophy Replicas; The Road to Omaha

John Lajba is an American sculptor who lives in Omaha, Nebraska. He is known for his work in creating sculptures of historical and sports figures, and creates the annual Harley J. Earl Trophies presented to the winner of the Daytona 500.

== Work ==
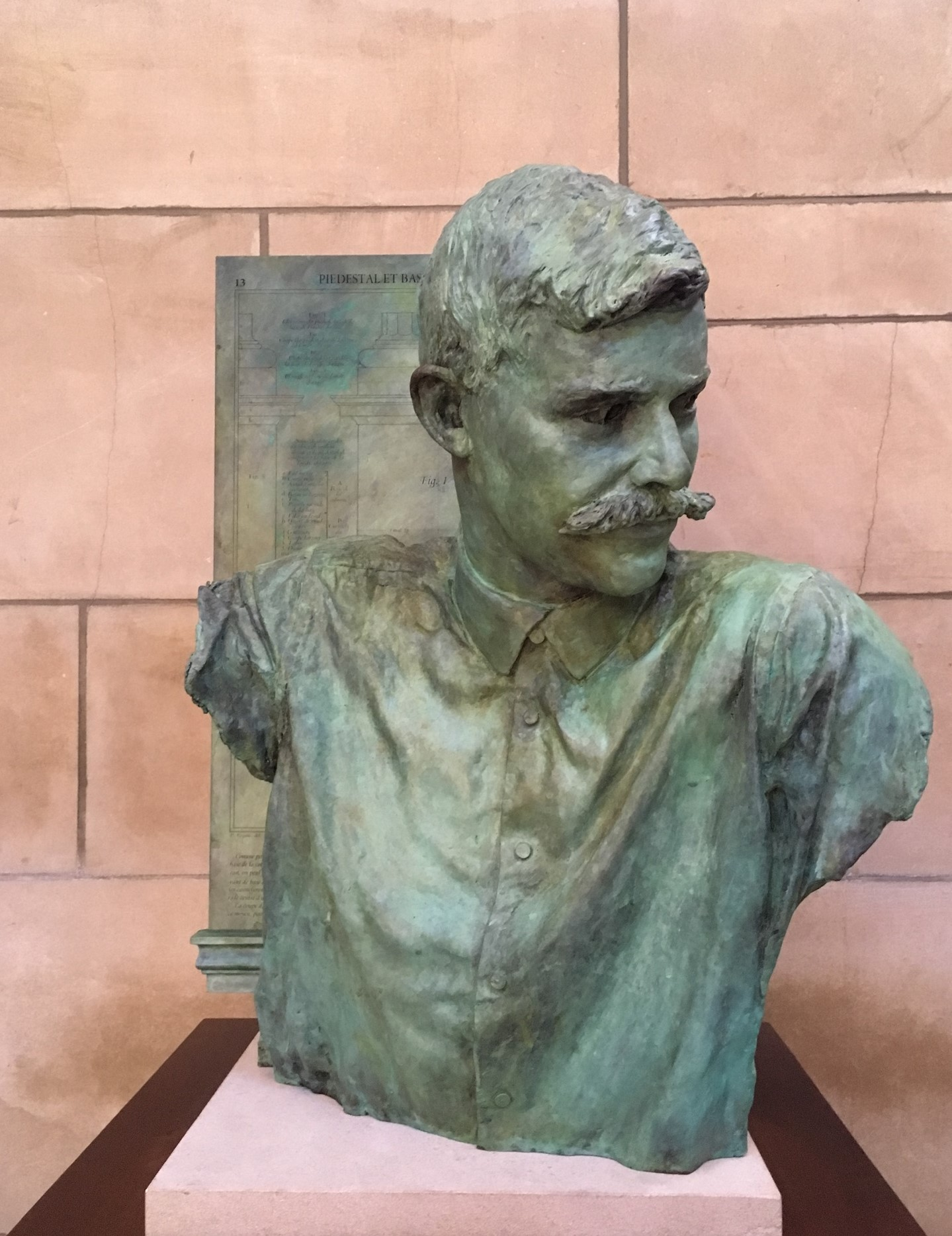
Bust of Thomas Rogers Kimball created by Lajiba in 2019 for the Nebraska Hall of Fame.

The owner of the John E. Lajba Sculptor Corporation, located in Omaha, Nebraska, Lajba's work includes a number of sports-related sculptures. This includes The Road to Omaha, a sculpture celebrating the College World Series, located outside TD Ameritrade Park in Omaha, Nebraska. Lajba also created a World War II memorial sculpture for the city of Omaha, as part of the 50th Anniversary World War II Memorial, dedicated in 1995 in the city's Heartland of America Park. Lajba sculptures are also found in Omaha's Durham Museum, representing travelers on the Union Pacific Railroad.

Perhaps his most widely known work is the creation of a miniature replica of the Harley J. Earl Trophy for awarding to the annual winner of the Daytona 500, the season-opening and premier race of the National Association for Stock Car Auto Racing's Sprint Cup Series. Each trophy, weighing 54 pounds (24 kg), takes six weeks of twelve-hour workdays to create. Lajba also created a sculpture of NASCAR founder Bill France Sr. and his wife, Ann France, for display at NASCAR corporate headquarters in Daytona Beach, Florida, as well as a sculpture of Dale Earnhardt which stands outside of the Daytona International Speedway. Another Lajba sculpture in Daytona Beach stands on the campus of Bethune-Cookman College, a likeness of college founder Mary McLeod Bethune commissioned for the college's 100th anniversary.

He created a bust of Thomas Rogers Kimball in 2019 for the Nebraska Hall of Fame.
