= St. Frances Cabrini Catholic Church (Omaha, Nebraska) =

Historic church in Nebraska, United States

- St. Philomena's Cathedral and Rectory
- U.S. National Register of Historic Places
- Omaha Landmark
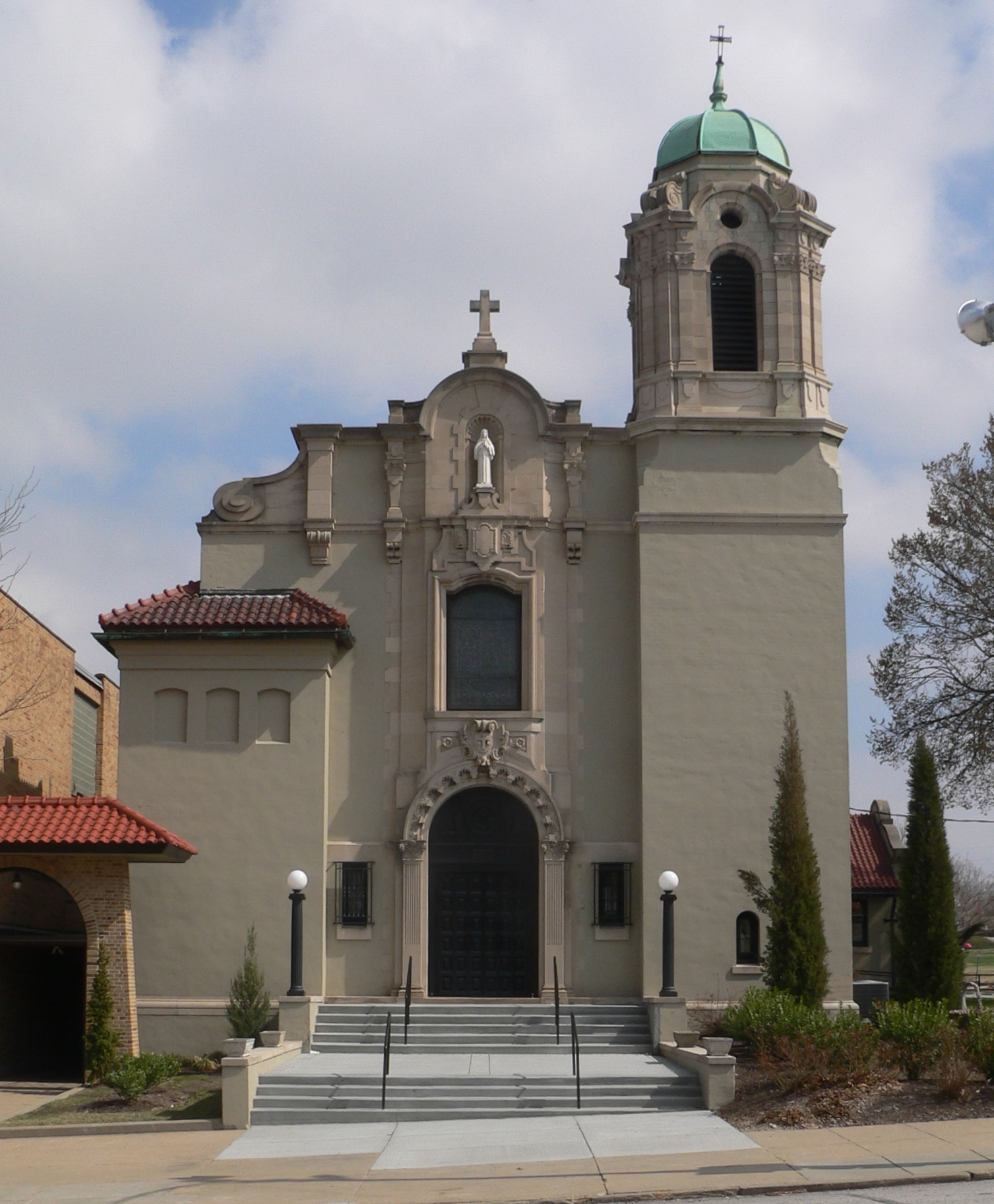

- Location within Nebraska Location within the United States
- Location: 1335 S. 10th St. Omaha, Nebraska
- Coordinates: 41°14′45.26″N 95°55′43.89″W
- Built: 1908
- Architect: Thomas Rogers Kimball
- Architectural style: Spanish Renaissance Revival
- NRHP reference No.: 80002451

Significant dates
- Added to NRHP: January 3, 1980
- Designated OMAL: February 13, 1979

St. Frances Cabrini Catholic Church is a historic Catholic church building in Omaha, Nebraska, United States. It was formerly the cathedral of the Diocese of Omaha and was named St. Philomena's Cathedral at that time. The church and the rectory are listed on the National Register of Historic Places and are also Omaha Landmarks under the St. Philomena name.

== History ==
The Spanish Renaissance Revival style church was built in 1908 as St. Philomena's Cathedral. It served the Diocese of Omaha as its cathedral church until St. Cecilia's Cathedral was substantially completed in 1916. The church was designed by Omaha architect Thomas Rogers Kimball. The name of the church was changed in 1958 to honor the first American citizen to be canonized a saint, Frances Xavier Cabrini. It was named an Omaha Landmark in 1979 and it was added to the National Register in 1980.

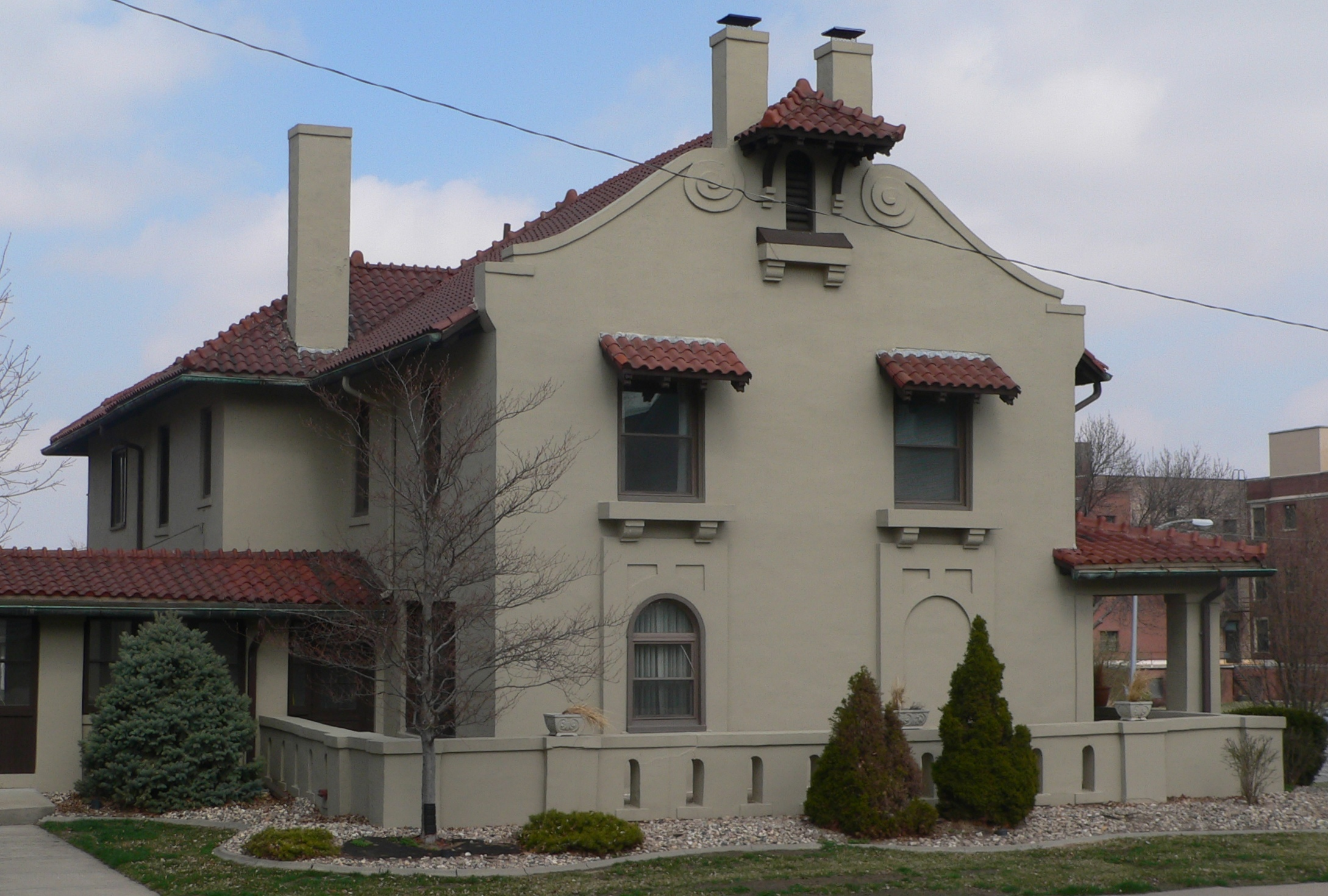
Rectory

== See also ==
- List of Catholic cathedrals in the United States
- List of cathedrals in the United States
