= Park School (Omaha) =

- U.S. National Register of Historic Places
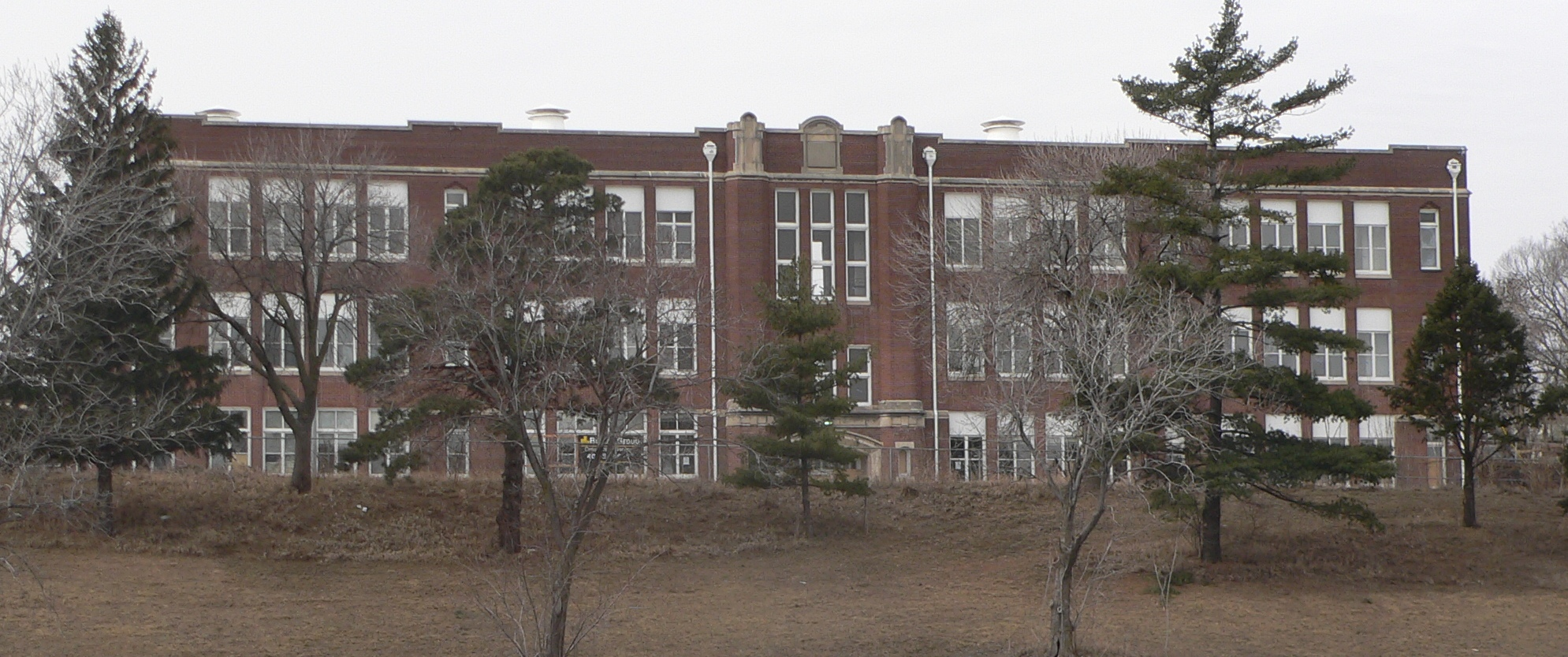
- Park School in February 2013

- Location within Nebraska Location within the United States
- Location: 1320 South 29 Street, Omaha, Nebraska
- Coordinates: 41°14′45.6″N 95°57′17.2″W
- Architect: Thomas R. Kimball
- Architectural style: Collegiate Gothic
- NRHP reference No.: 89002043
- Added to NRHP: November 29, 1989

Park School is located at 1320 South 29th Street in south Omaha, Nebraska, United States. The school was designed by Thomas R. Kimball and built in 1918. It was listed on the National Register of Historic Places in 1989 and designated an Omaha Landmark in 1990.

== About ==
Named for its proximity to Hanscom Park and built with masonry on a frame of reinforced concrete, the footprint for the school was built on a "U" shape. Two stories had 18 rooms, with no original gymnasium or library because of spending constraints caused by World War I.

The school was closed in the 1980s, and Omaha Public Schools sold it in 1988. The building was renovated and sold as apartments.

== See also ==
- History of Omaha
