= Owasco, Nebraska =

Unincorporated community in Nebraska, U.S.

Coordinates: 41°14′22″N 103°34′30″W

Owasco is an unincorporated community in Kimball County, Nebraska, United States.

== History ==
Owasco was a station on the Union Pacific Railroad. It was named after the Circle Arrow Ranch company nearby, with the O symbolizing the "Circle".
