= Nebraska Telephone Company Building =

- U.S. National Register of Historic Places
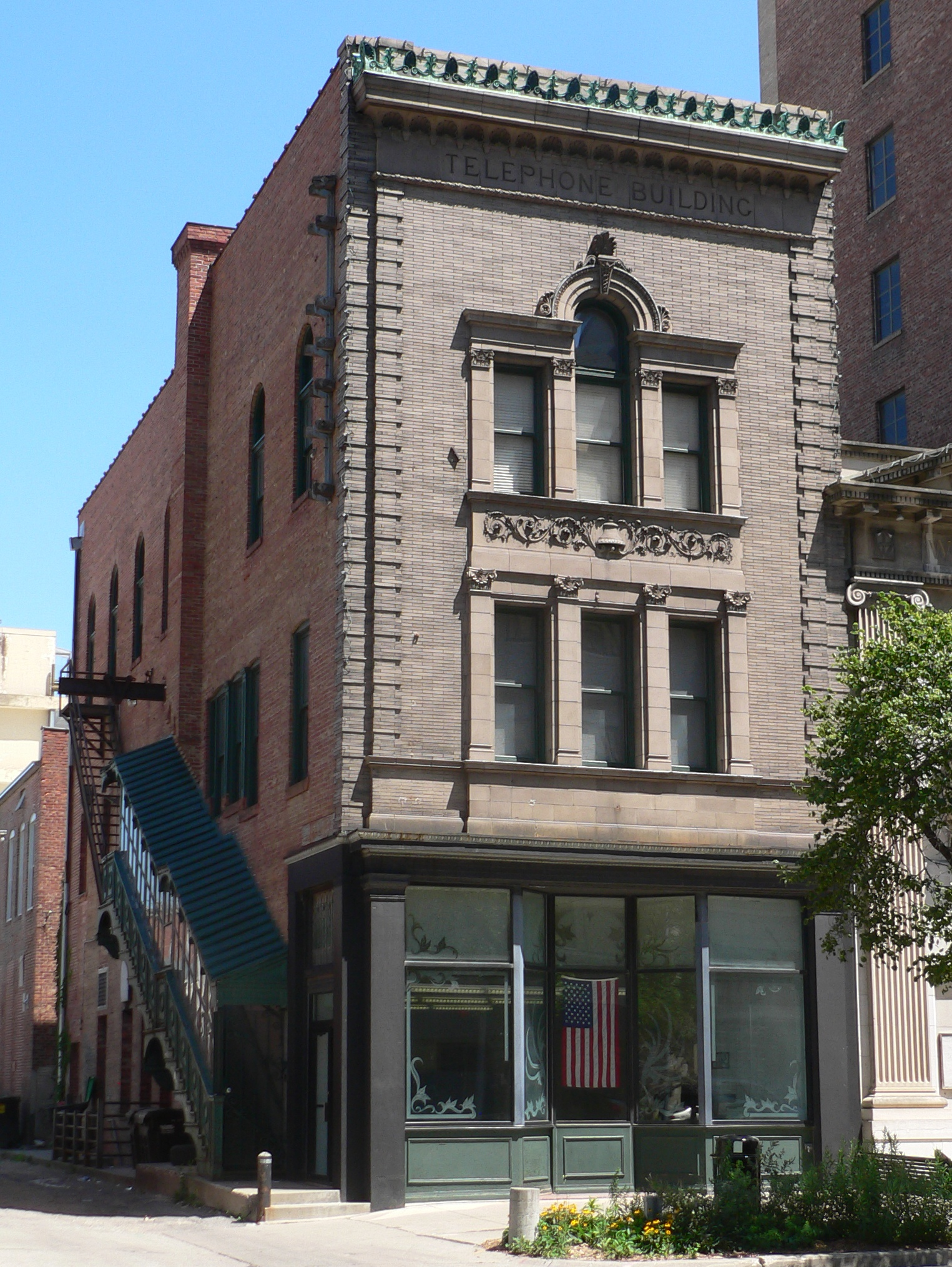
- The building in 2012

- Location within Nebraska Location within the United States
- Location: 128--130 South 13th Street, Lincoln, Nebraska
- Coordinates: 40°48′46″N 96°42′08″W
- Area: less than one acre
- Built: 1894
- Architect: Walker & Kimball
- Architectural style: Renaissance
- NRHP reference No.: 78001703
- Added to NRHP: November 16, 1978

The Nebraska Telephone Company Building is a historic three-story building in Lincoln, Nebraska. It was built in 1894 for the Nebraska Telephone Company, and designed in the Renaissance Revival style by Thomas R. Kimball of Walker & Kimball. From 1912 to 1914, it belonged to the Lincoln Telephone and Telegraph Company, after which it was rented to different companies. It has been listed on the National Register of Historic Places since November 16, 1978.
