= Kimball County, Nebraska =

County in Nebraska, United States

- County
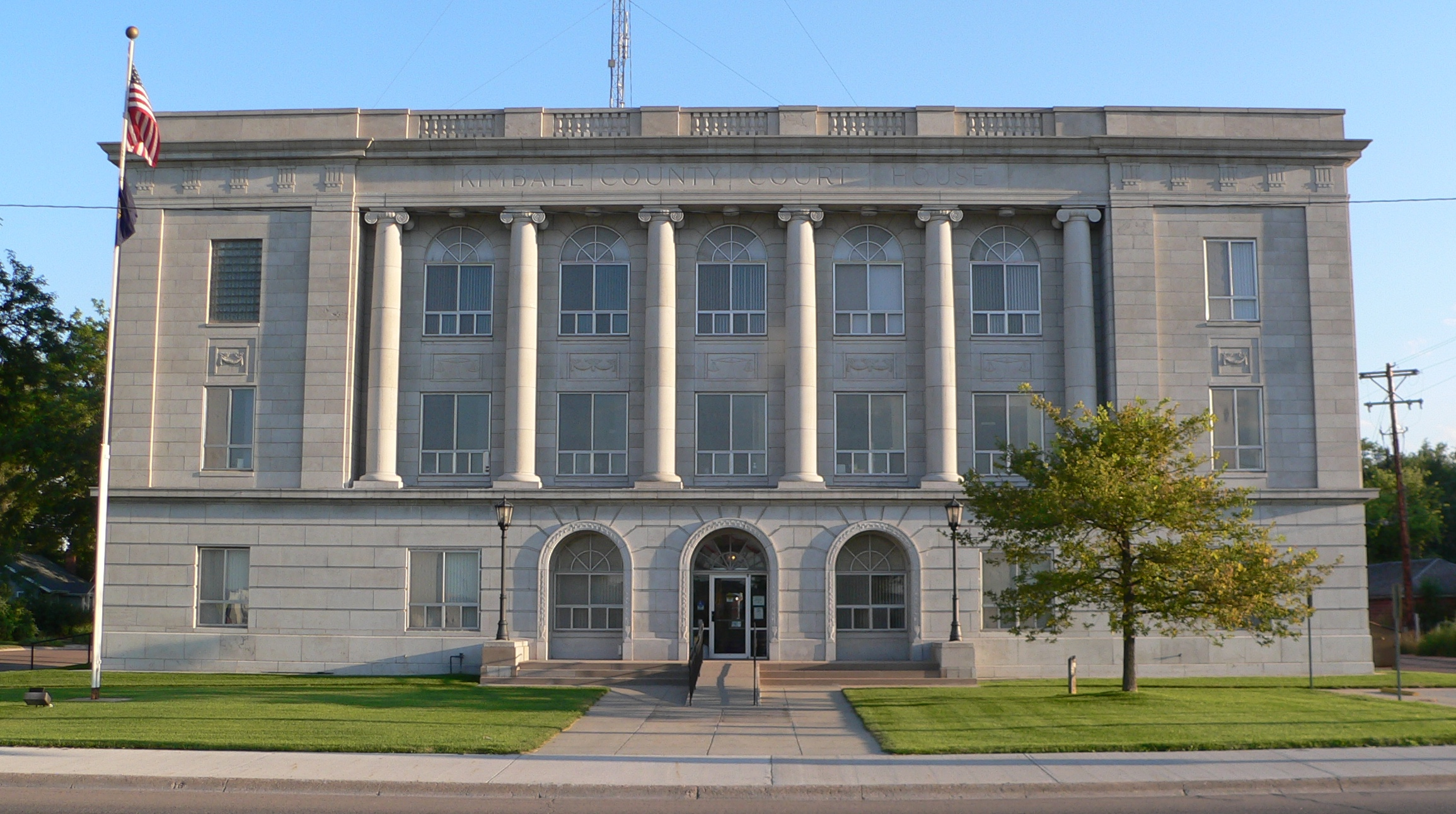
- The Kimball County Courthouse in Kimball

- Location within the U.S. state of Nebraska
- Coordinates: 41.199274°N 103.703153°W
- Country: United States
- State: Nebraska
- Founded: November 6, 1888
- Named for: Thomas Lord Kimball
- Seat: Kimball
- Largest city: Kimball

Area
  - Total: 952.501 sq mi (2,466.97 km^{2})
  - Land: 951.942 sq mi (2,465.52 km^{2})
  - Water: 0.559 sq mi (1.45 km^{2}) 0.06%

Population (2020)
  - Total: 3,434
  - Estimate (2025): 3,391 ▼
  - Density: 3.607/sq mi (1.393/km^{2})
- Time zone: UTC−7 (Mountain)
  - Summer (DST): UTC−6 (MDT)
- Area code: 308
- Congressional district: 3rd
- Website: kimballcountyne.gov
- • Nebraska county number 53 • Nebraska license plate prefix 71

Kimball County is a county in the U.S. state of Nebraska. As of the 2020 census, the population was 3,434. and was estimated to be 3,391 in 2025. The county seat and the largest city is Kimball.

In the Nebraska license plate system, Kimball County was represented by the prefix "71" (as it had the 71st-largest number of vehicles registered in the state when the license plate system was established in 1922).

== History ==
Kimball County was created on November 6, 1888 and named after railroad pioneer Thomas Lord Kimball.

== Geography ==
According to the United States Census Bureau, the county has a total area of 952.501 square miles (2,466.97 km^{2}), of which 951.942 square miles (2,465.52 km^{2}) is land and 0.559 square miles (1.45 km^{2}) (0.06%) is water. It is the 19th-largest county in Nebraska by total area.

The terrain of Kimball County consists of rolling hills sloping to the east. The flatter portions are mainly used for agriculture, mostly dry farming with a modest amount of center pivot irrigation. A small drainage, Lodgepole Creek, feeds into the Oliver Reservoir, in the western central part of the county. The highest natural point in Nebraska, Panorama Point at 5,424 feet (1,653 m), is located in Kimball County.

=== Major highways ===
- Interstate 80
- U.S. Highway 30
- Nebraska Highway 71

=== Adjacent counties ===
- Banner County – north
- Cheyenne County – east
- Logan County, Colorado – southeast
- Weld County, Colorado – southwest
- Laramie County, Wyoming – west

=== Protected areas ===
- Oliver Reservoir State Recreation Area.

== Demographics ==
Historical population
Census	Pop.	Note	%±
1890	959		—
1900	758		−21.0%
1910	1,942		156.2%
1920	4,498		131.6%
1930	4,675		3.9%
1940	3,913		−16.3%
1950	4,283		9.5%
1960	7,975		86.2%
1970	6,009		−24.7%
1980	4,882		−18.8%
1990	4,108		−15.9%
2000	4,089		−0.5%
2010	3,821		−6.6%
2020	3,434		−10.1%
2025 (est.)	3,391	▼	−1.3%
U.S. Decennial Census; 1790–1960 1900–1990; 1990–2000 2010–2020

=== 2020 census ===
As of the 2020 census, the county had a population of 3,434. The median age was 49.0 years. 19.6% of residents were under the age of 18 and 26.8% of residents were 65 years of age or older. For every 100 females there were 100.2 males, and for every 100 females age 18 and over there were 98.8 males age 18 and over.

The racial makeup of the county was 90.9% White, 0.0% Black or African American, 1.2% American Indian and Alaska Native, 0.4% Asian, 0.0% Native Hawaiian and Pacific Islander, 1.8% from some other race, and 5.6% from two or more races. Hispanic or Latino residents of any race comprised 7.6% of the population.

0.0% of residents lived in urban areas, while 100.0% lived in rural areas.

There were 1,501 households in the county, of which 24.1% had children under the age of 18 living with them and 22.7% had a female householder with no spouse or partner present. About 30.9% of all households were made up of individuals and 16.0% had someone living alone who was 65 years of age or older.

There were 1,805 housing units, of which 16.8% were vacant. Among occupied housing units, 73.1% were owner-occupied and 26.9% were renter-occupied. The homeowner vacancy rate was 3.0% and the rental vacancy rate was 18.7%.

=== 2000 census ===
As of the 2000 census, there were 4,089 people, 1,727 households, and 1,136 families in the county. The population density was 4 people per square mile (1.5 people/km^{2}). There were 1,972 housing units at an average density of 2 units per square mile (0.77/km^{2}). The racial makeup of the county was 96.99% White, 0.22% Black or African American, 0.66% Native American, 0.10% Asian, 0.02% Pacific Islander, 0.66% from other races, and 1.35% from two or more races. 3.33% of the population were Hispanic or Latino of any race. 34.3% were of German, 12.2% English, 7.9% Irish, 6.1% American and 5.5% Swedish ancestry.

There were 1,727 households, out of which 26.30% had children under the age of 18 living with them, 56.10% were married couples living together, 6.70% had a female householder with no husband present, and 34.20% were non-families. 30.50% of all households were made up of individuals, and 15.40% had someone living alone who was 65 years of age or older. The average household size was 2.33 and the average family size was 2.89.

The county population contained 24.70% under the age of 18, 5.90% from 18 to 24, 23.00% from 25 to 44, 25.30% from 45 to 64, and 21.00% who were 65 years of age or older. The median age was 43 years. For every 100 females, there were 95.60 males. For every 100 females age 18 and over, there were 91.20 males.

The median income for a household in the county was $30,586, and the median income for a family was $35,880. Males had a median income of $28,300 versus $16,863 for females. The per capita income for the county was $17,525. About 9.10% of families and 11.10% of the population were below the poverty line, including 12.30% of those under age 18 and 5.90% of those age 65 or over.

== Communities ==
=== City ===
- Kimball (county seat)

=== Villages ===
- Bushnell
- Dix

=== Unincorporated communities ===
- Jacinto
- Oliver
- Owasco

== Politics ==
Kimball County voters are reliably Republican. In only three national elections has the county selected the Democratic Party candidate, most recently in 1936.

United States presidential election results for Kimball County, Nebraska
Year	Republican		Democratic		Third party(ies)	
Year	No.	%	No.	%	No.	%
1900	137	72.11%	48	25.26%	5	2.63%
1904	143	80.34%	20	11.24%	15	8.43%
1908	216	60.50%	124	34.73%	17	4.76%
1912	73	17.85%	109	26.65%	227	55.50%
1916	223	34.36%	388	59.78%	38	5.86%
1920	910	70.05%	339	26.10%	50	3.85%
1924	750	51.23%	253	17.28%	461	31.49%
1928	1,296	74.01%	438	25.01%	17	0.97%
1932	793	37.58%	1,268	60.09%	49	2.32%
1936	842	41.44%	1,137	55.95%	53	2.61%
1940	1,190	61.82%	735	38.18%	0	0.00%
1944	1,169	66.99%	576	33.01%	0	0.00%
1948	1,024	60.38%	672	39.62%	0	0.00%
1952	1,646	77.60%	475	22.40%	0	0.00%
1956	1,590	70.79%	656	29.21%	0	0.00%
1960	2,152	67.93%	1,016	32.07%	0	0.00%
1964	1,573	55.88%	1,242	44.12%	0	0.00%
1968	1,423	68.61%	414	19.96%	237	11.43%
1972	1,650	79.06%	437	20.94%	0	0.00%
1976	1,257	62.82%	696	34.78%	48	2.40%
1980	1,615	75.61%	385	18.02%	136	6.37%
1984	1,734	83.09%	339	16.24%	14	0.67%
1988	1,321	69.89%	540	28.57%	29	1.53%
1992	931	52.04%	408	22.81%	450	25.15%
1996	1,011	56.67%	527	29.54%	246	13.79%
2000	1,379	75.77%	379	20.82%	62	3.41%
2004	1,491	79.44%	366	19.50%	20	1.07%
2008	1,346	74.32%	439	24.24%	26	1.44%
2012	1,235	73.21%	395	23.41%	57	3.38%
2016	1,330	79.31%	230	13.71%	117	6.98%
2020	1,563	83.27%	268	14.28%	46	2.45%
2024	1,424	82.69%	272	15.80%	26	1.51%

== See also ==
- National Register of Historic Places listings in Kimball County, Nebraska
