= George Ward Holdrege =

American railroad officer (1847–1926)

- Portrait of George Ward Holdrege from "Omaha the Gate City, and Douglas County, Nebraska", 1917
- Born: March 26, 1847; New York City, New York, U.S.
- Died: September 14, 1926 (aged 79); Omaha, Nebraska, U.S.
- Education: Matriculated Harvard
- Occupations: Railroad officer, land owner
- Spouse: Emily Cabot Atkinson (m. 1872) Frances Rodgers Kimball (m. 1878)
- Children: 4

George Ward Holdrege (March 26, 1847 – September 14, 1926) was an American railroad officer and cattle rancher with large land holdings in western Nebraska. An early advocate of modern agricultural practices, he experimented with irrigation, dryland farming methods, soil conservation, and crop rotation. The town of Holdrege in Phelps County, Nebraska, is named in his honor.

== Early life ==
Born in New York City on March 26, 1847, he was the second son of Henry Holdrege Jr. and Mary Russell Grennell Holdrege. His father was employed by the New York Commission Mercantile Firm of Grinnell, Minturn & Company. Through his mother's family, Holdrege had a heritage that connected him with some of the most illustrious New England families: Grinnell, Russell and Howland.

In 1850, the family left New York City to establish their home at Irvington-on-Hudson, in Westchester County. At sixteen, Holdrege attended a private day school in Boston operated by William Parsons Atkinson, one of the original faculty members of Massachusetts Institute of Technology. In June 1865, he graduated from Atkinson's school and spent the summer in Cambridge preparing for his entrance to Harvard where he was a member of the University Boat Club. After his father's business failed in 1869, Holdrege returned home and never graduated.

On February 12, 1872, Holdrege married Emily Cabot Atkinson at Boston, Massachusetts. Her death, on November 13, 1873, followed the birth of their son, Henry Atkinson Holdrege, the day prior. While looking for help raising his young son, Holdrege met Thomas Lord Kimball, an executive at competing Union Pacific Railroad. Kimball made several failed attempts at recruiting Holdrege. Despite their professional rivalry, on April 23, 1878, Holdrege married Kimball's daughter, Frances Rodgers Kimball, older sister of architect Thomas Rogers Kimball. In 1880, their first born, a son, died two months after birth. Subsequently, they became the parents of three daughters: Mrs. Mary Holdrege Holyoke, Mrs. Susan Holdrege Hollister, and Leeta Holdrege.

== Career ==
While visiting Clifford Watson, a friend in Boston, in 1869, Holdrege secured a job interview with railroad magnate John Murray Forbes, who offered him a position with his new railroad in Nebraska. George moved to Plattsmouth, Nebraska, and was employed as a railroad clerk for the Burlington and Missouri River Railroad Company (B & M) where he served as assistant paymaster, brakeman, conductor, trainmaster and assistant superintendent. In 1882, he was appointed General Manager. During his career, the B & M Railroad in Nebraska expanded from 495 miles of track to 4,713 west of the Missouri River, including the completion of a line from Grand Island through the Sandhills to Sheridan, Wyoming

With the arrival of the B & M Railroad at Sheridan, coal mines were developed along the Tongue River. Anson Higby formed the Sheridan Fuel Company, and when midwestern capitalist Gould Dietz became the treasurer of the company, the name of the camp was changed to Dietz. Dietz and Holdrege collaborated with Omaha architect Thomas Rogers Kimball to create the Dome Lake Club, high in the Big Horn Mountain range. It was constructed after the railroad sent a scouting party led by surveyor Edward Gillette, who in 1884 was in charge of locating the most economical route for the railroad by investigating grade, distance, and other factors. Holdrege's rail lines began in Nebraska, worked up through the Black Hills of present-day South Dakota, and into Wyoming Territory with further extensions reaching Billings, Montana.

=== Land Holdings ===
George Holdrege invested extensively in Nebraska panhandle ranchland including the HO ranch in Perkins County. As pioneers began to settle along the land areas newly opened up by the B & M lines, he envisioned that the railroad should become active in increasing the agricultural and mining production of the area it served. To this end, the railroad developed an experimental farm, irrigation service, and free transportation of the grain produced to market.

=== Retirement ===
On December 31, 1920, after 51 continuous years of service, Holdrege retired from the B&M railroad. Widely known as a central figure in legislative debates at the Nebraska State Capitol, George was awarded the “Distinguished Service Medal” by the Lincoln Kiwanis Club in 1925.

=== Death ===
He suffered a heart attack at his home in Omaha, Nebraska and died on September 14, 1926. George Ward Holdrege is interred at Wyuka Cemetery, Lincoln, Lancaster County, Nebraska.

== Legacy ==
In 1965, he was inducted into the Hall of Great Westerners, created to celebrate the contributions of more than 200 men and women of the American West.

He was a member of the Unitarian Church, Omaha Chamber of Commerce, and the Omaha Club.

The town of Holdrege in Phelps County, Nebraska, is named in his honor.
