= Wattles House =

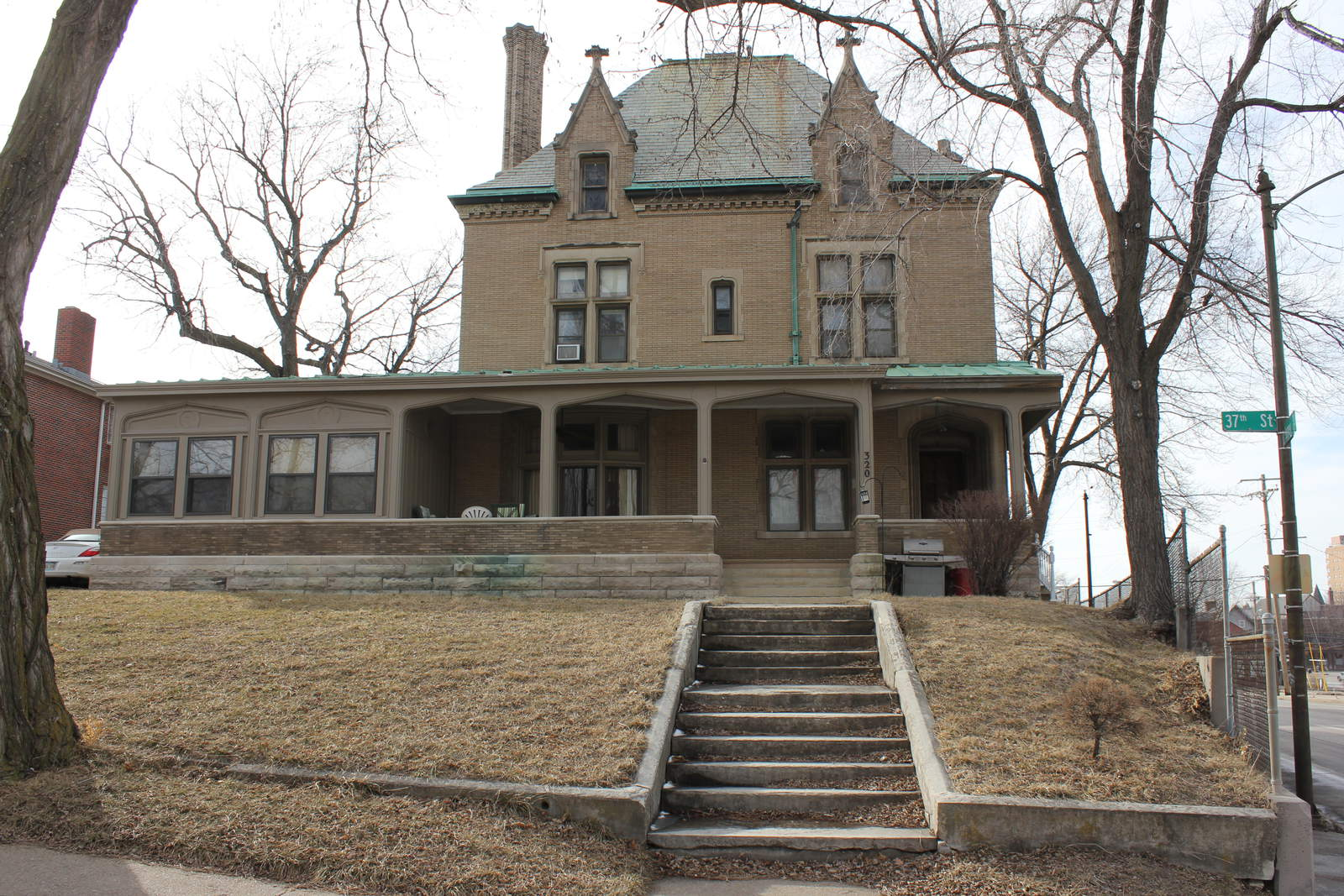
- The Wattles House located at 320 South 37th Street

- Location within Nebraska
- 41.25704715084914°N 95.96797009497202°W
- Location: Omaha, Nebraska

History
- Built: 1895

Site notes
- Architect: Thomas R. Kimball
- Architectural style: Chateauesque Style

Omaha Landmark
- Designated: April 11, 1995

The Wattles House is located at 320 South 37th Street in the Midtown area of Omaha, Nebraska. Designed by renowned Omaha architect Thomas Rogers Kimball in the Chateauesque style, the house was built in 1895. It was designated an Omaha Landmark on April 11, 1995, and is part of the Gold Coast Historic District, which was listed as on the National Register of Historic Places.

== About ==
Gurdon Wattles was a noted Omaha business leader who was the organizer of the 1898 Trans-Mississippi and International Exposition in Omaha. The Wattles House was designed by Thomas Rogers Kimball, who was architect-in-chief for the Exposition. The Wattles house is one of the few examples of the Chateauesque style in Omaha. The house has been a single family dwelling for many years and its outlying carriage house has been made into apartments.
