= Jacinto, Nebraska =

Unincorporated community in Nebraska, U.S.

Coordinates: 41°13′33″N 103°24′15″W

Jacinto is an unincorporated community in Kimball County, Nebraska, United States.

== History ==
Jacinto was a station on the Union Pacific Railroad.

Jacinto is derived from a Spanish name meaning "hyacinth".
