= Thomas Rogers Kimball =

American architect

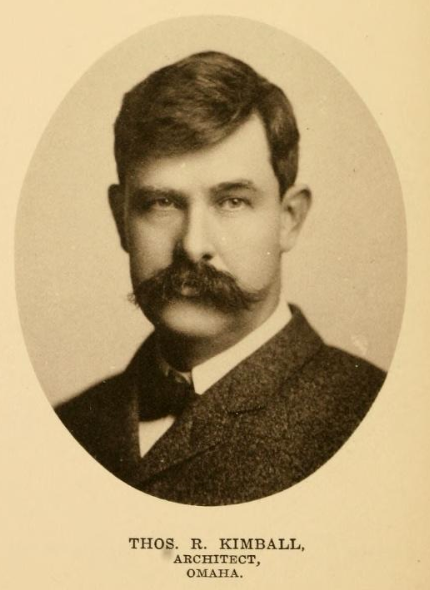
- Thomas Rogers Kimball
- Born: April 19, 1862; Linwood, Ohio, US
- Died: September 7, 1934 (aged 72); Omaha, Nebraska, US
- Education: University of Nebraska; Massachusetts Institute of Technology; École des Beaux-Arts
- Occupation: Architect
- Spouse: Annie McPhail Kimball

Thomas Rogers Kimball (April 19, 1862 – September 7, 1934) was an American architect in Omaha, Nebraska. An architect-in-chief of the Trans-Mississippi Exposition in Omaha in 1898, he served as national President of the American Institute of Architects from 1918 to 1920 and from 1919 to 1932 served on the Nebraska State Capitol Commission.

Kimball was credited with pursuing 871 commissions including designing 167 new residential buildings and 162 new non-residential structures. The National Register of Historic Places received nomination forms for 42 of Kimball’s works. In 1905 he was invited to judge the San Francisco Custom House competition. Kimball served as architectural adviser to commissions responsible for erection of the Missouri and Nebraska state capitols, the Kansas City Liberty Memorial, and the Indiana War Memorial in Indianapolis, and was a member of the national council of fine arts established by U.S. President Theodore Roosevelt to evaluate all plans for public buildings, monuments, and statutes.

== Biography ==
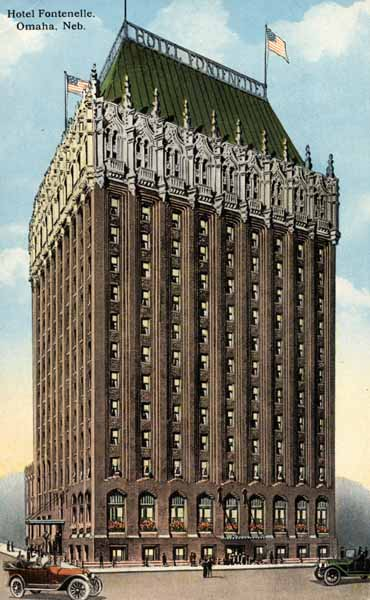
The Hotel Fontenelle in Omaha, Nebraska, designed by Thomas Kimball

Born April 19, 1862, in Linwood, Cincinnati, Ohio, he moved to Omaha, Nebraska with his parents Thomas Lord Kimball and Mary Porter Rogers Kimball when he was nine. Kimball attended Central High School until 1878 when he enrolled at the University of Nebraska Latin School (former University of Nebraska–Lincoln prep school) for two years. Through connections with their father, older sister Frances Rodgers Kimball married American railroad officer George Ward Holdrege that same year.

Next, Kimball went to Boston, where he worked with a private tutor for two years. He then entered the Massachusetts Institute of Technology to study architecture until 1887. He did not graduate but was later given an affiliation with the School of Architecture. Kimball continued at the Cowles Art School of Boston then moved to Paris where he spent a year studying art at L'Ecole des Beaux Arts under notable tutors such as Henri Harpingnies. Returning to Boston in 1888, Kimball along with Henry D. Bates established Technology Architectural Review, a publication of The Massachusetts Institute of Technology Architectural Society. As reported in the first issue, "The REVIEW - the first essay of its kind by architectural students in America - will aim to call attention to and emphasize the resources of classical architecture, and its usefulness as a basis for all design." The following year, Kimball married Annie Lydia McPhail in Boston.

== Walker and Kimball ==
In 1891, Kimball formed an architectural firm with MIT instructor C. Howard Walker and architect Herbert Best. Best soon retired. Walker remained in Boston to run the office there; Kimball moved back to Omaha and opened an office. Both operated under the name Walker and Kimball. In 1892, Kimball was commissioned to design a public library building in Omaha. Although Kimball had been able to get the job through connections established by his father, railroad executive Thomas Lord Kimball, the younger Kimball was in fact well qualified for the work. He was also something of a curiosity in 1890s Omaha, since he had been educated in the East and had studied architecture both in the United States and in France. Kimball began attracting many high-profile projects in Omaha, including St. Philomena's Cathedral and the Burlington Train Station. In 1893, some of his architectural plans were shown in Chicago at the World Columbian Exposition.

The firm was selected to design the Palace of Electricity at the Louisiana Purchase Exposition, informally known as the St. Louis World's Fair, an international exposition held in St. Louis, Missouri, United States, from April 30 to December 1, 1904.

== Trans-Mississippi Exposition ==
The 1898 Trans Mississippi and International Exposition was a World's Fair-like event in Omaha that required the construction of many buildings. Kimball and Walker were named co-architects-in-chief for the event. The two men were responsible for the overall site development, including perimeter buildings. They designed several major buildings, some smaller structures and the Arch of States (a main entrance). "The other 'name' architects who were there did a main building and nothing else," Batie said.

The buildings were constructed of strips of wood covered with staff, which was a mixture of plaster and horsehair. They were temporary by design, built at about half the cost of permanent buildings. The lower cost allowed the construction of larger structures. Kimball was already successful, but his Exhibition work made him even more so. Kimball won commissions for major new projects, such as St. Cecilia Cathedral and the Fontenelle Hotel in Omaha, and the Electricity Building at the 1904 World's Fair in St. Louis.

== Late career ==
By 1918, he had gained tremendous stature among his peers and was elected national president of the American Institute of Architects, an office he held until 1920. Kimball was involved in many architecture-related activities, including supervision of the 1920 design contest that selected Bertram Goodhue as architect of the Nebraska State Capitol.

In 1927, Kimball went into a partnership with architects William L. Steele (1875–1949) and Josiah D. Sandham (1880–1969) to form the firm Kimball, Steele, and Sandham. Among other commissions, the firm designed the Second Church of Christ Scientist (Minneapolis, 1930) and with George B. Prinz were associate architects on the Federal Office Building (Omaha, 1933). However, Kimball functioned primarily as a consultant, having stopped working as an active architect.

== Death and legacy ==
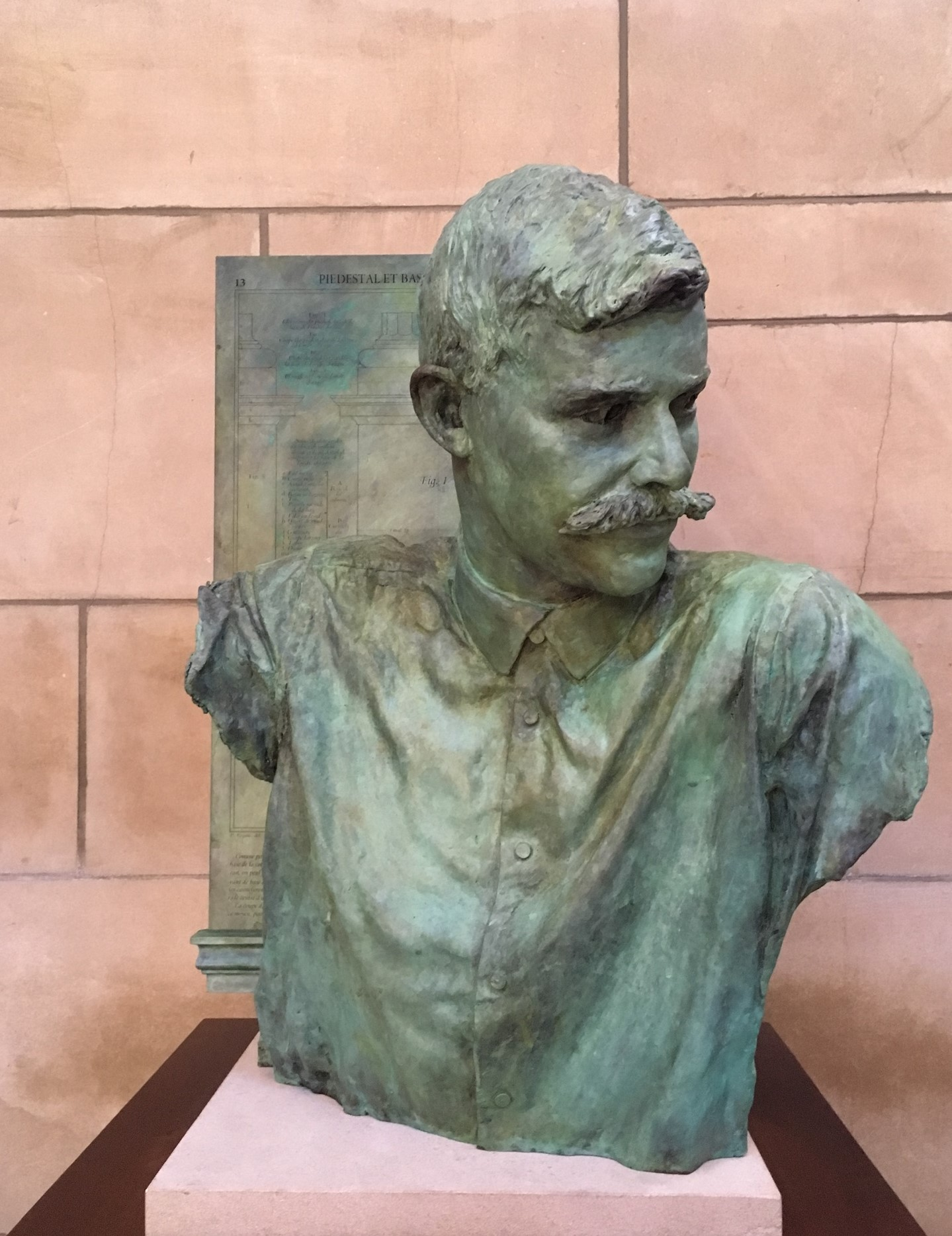
Bust of Kimball created by John Lajba in 2019 for the Nebraska Hall of Fame.

Kimball's success could not survive the Great Depression, which hurt him financially. He died a pauper in 1934. Upon his death, partner William L. Steele remarked that Kimball "did not...as the majority of his contemporaries did, absorb a repertoire of French tricks and come home. He studied architecture as building, not as merely drawings of the buildings. He seemed to have acquired at an early age that grasp of fundamental principles which was to keep him from being stampeded by passing fads."

In 2017, through the advocacy of Brother William J Woeger of the Archdiocese of Omaha, Kimball was inducted as the 26th member of the Nebraska Hall of Fame. A bronze bust of his likeness was created by John Lajba and is displayed in the state capitol.

On June 25, 2019, the Nebraska Board of Engineers and Architects awarded its first and, to date, only honorary architect license to Kimball in conjunction with his Hall of Fame induction. The board was created on August 16, 1937, almost three years after Kimball's death, so Kimball never had the opportunity to become a licensed architect in his home state.

== Notable designs ==
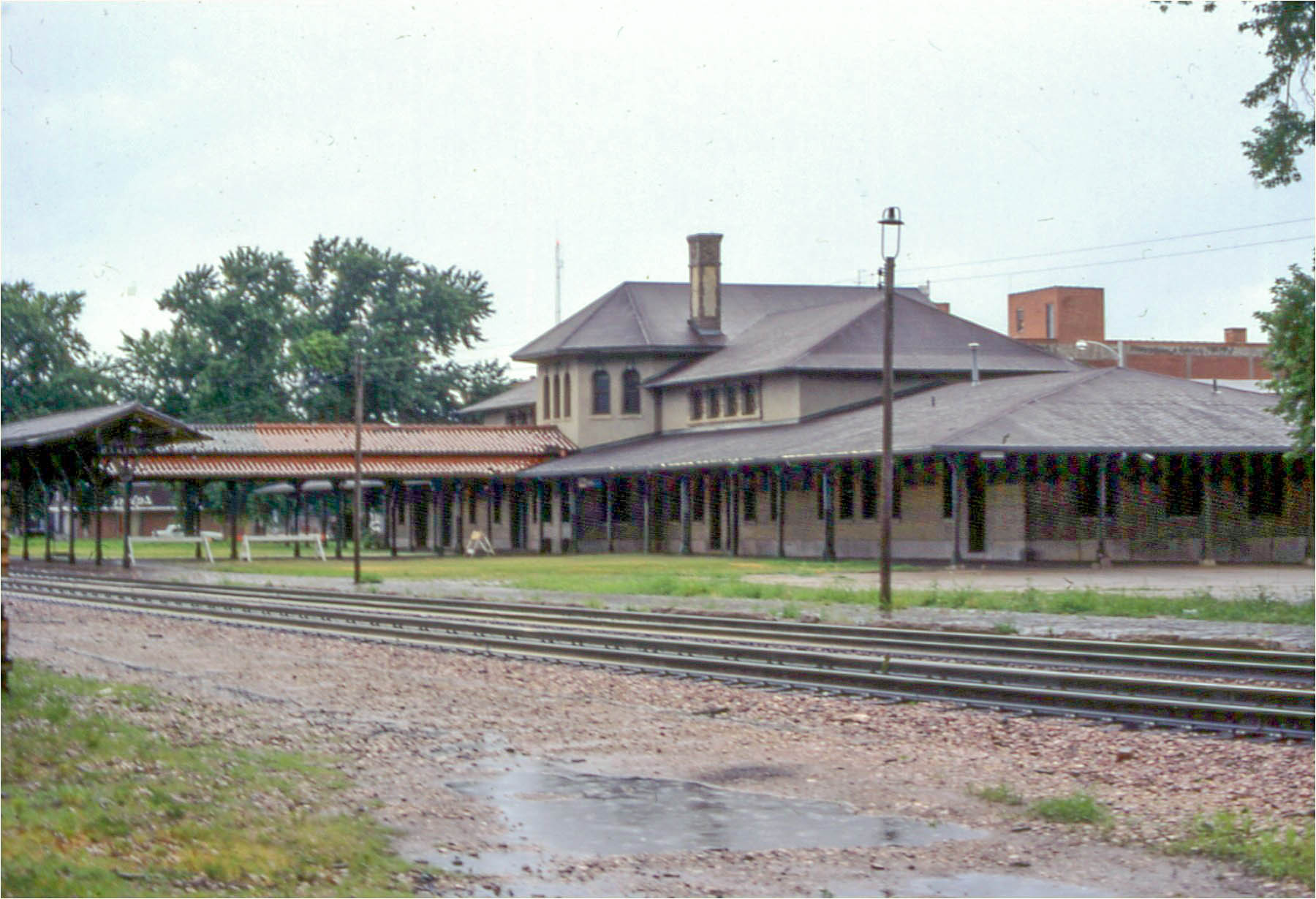
Burlington Station, Hastings, Nebraska, 1908

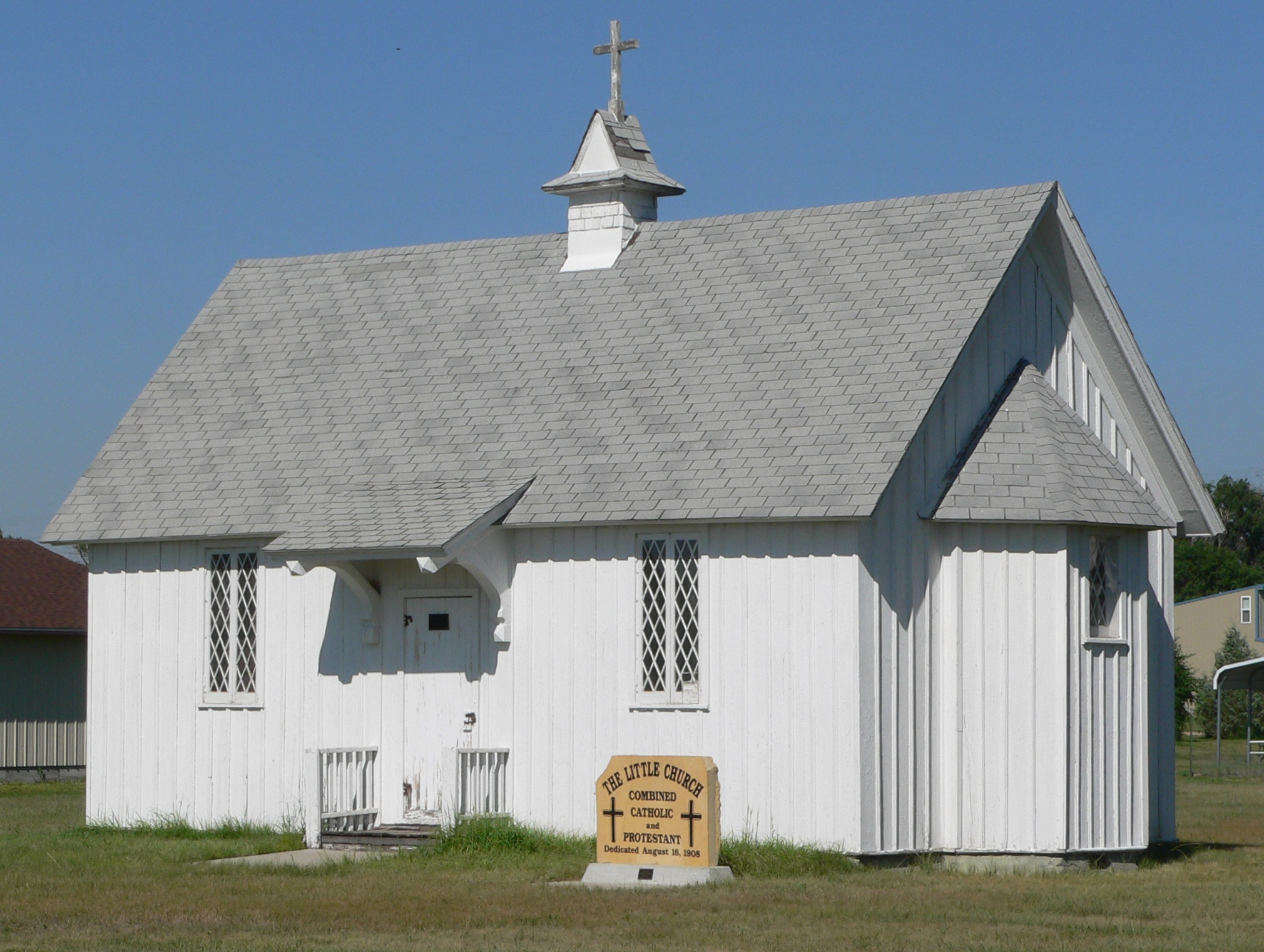
Keystone, Nebraska Community Church, 1908

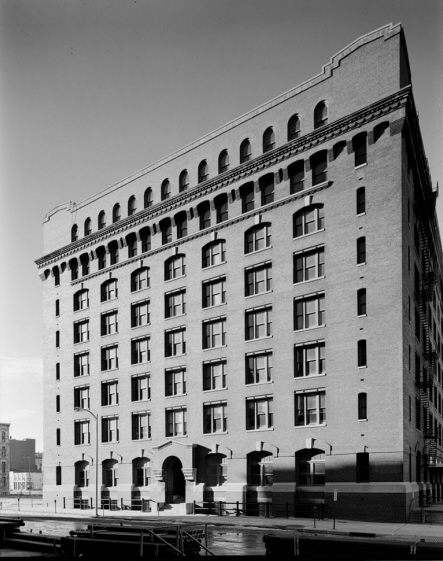
The Nash Block, a 1905 design in Downtown Omaha.

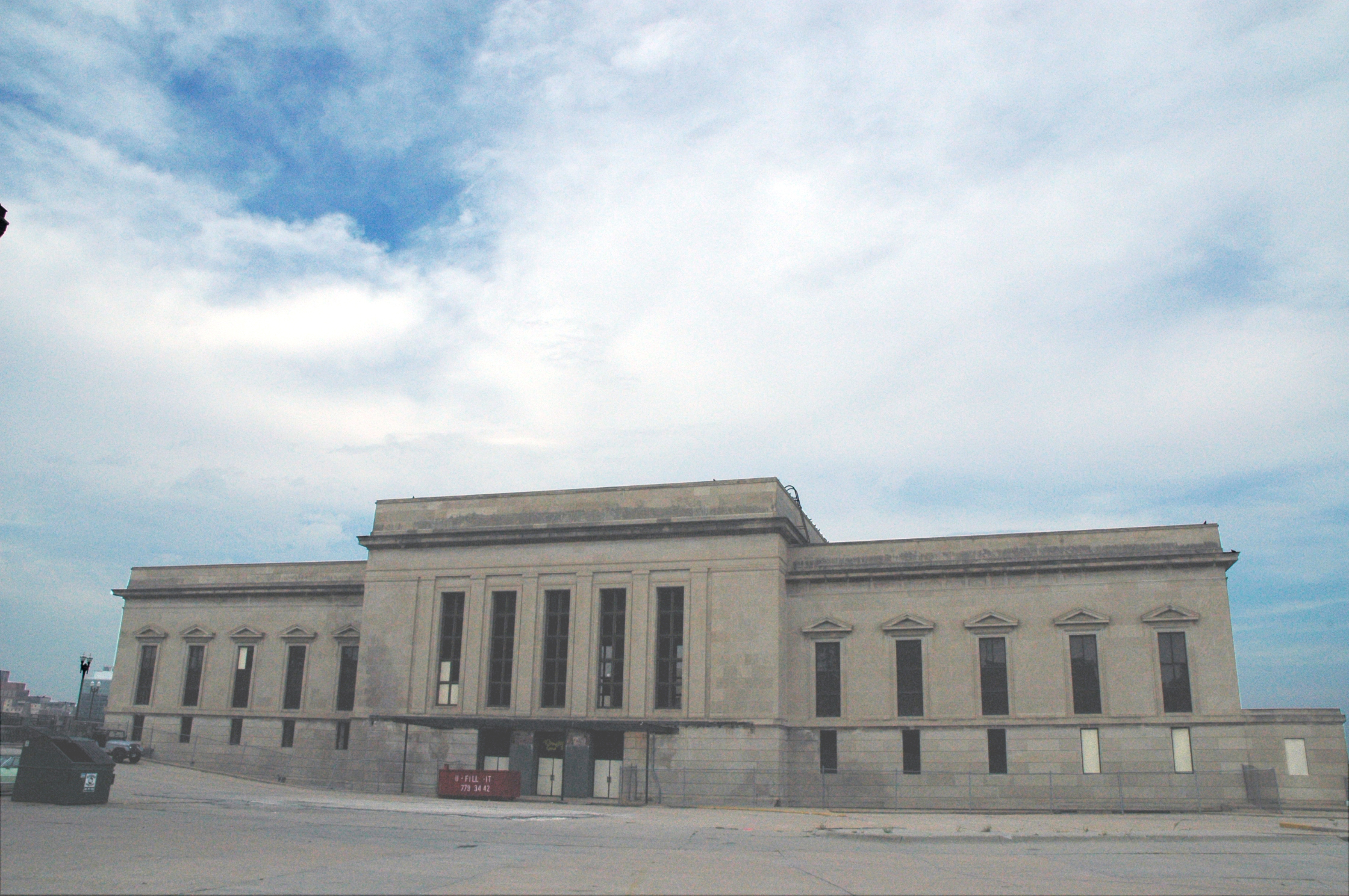
One of Kimball's earliest, this is the 1929 remodeling of his 1898 Burlington Station.

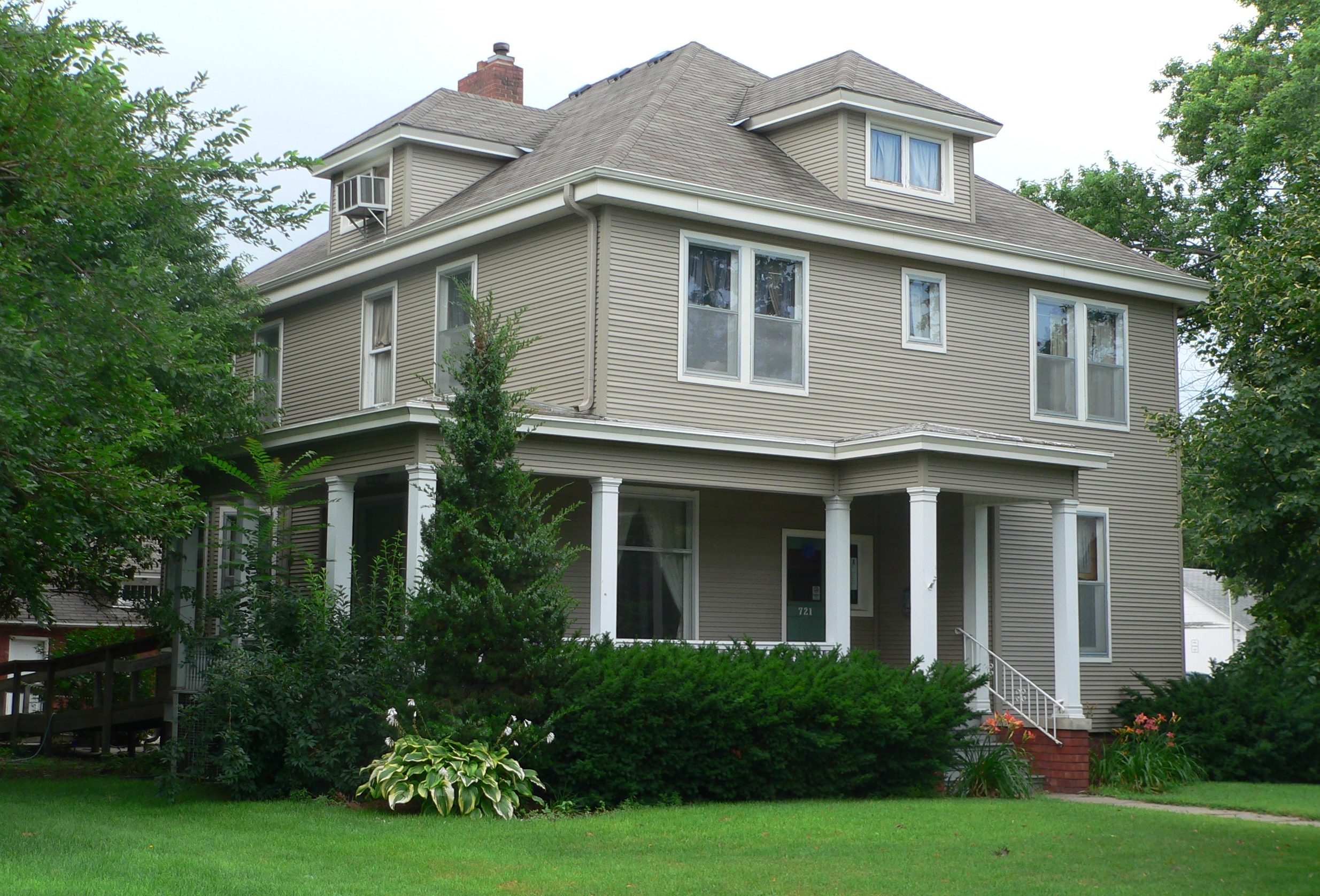
Oscar Roeser House, Grand Island, Nebraska, 1908

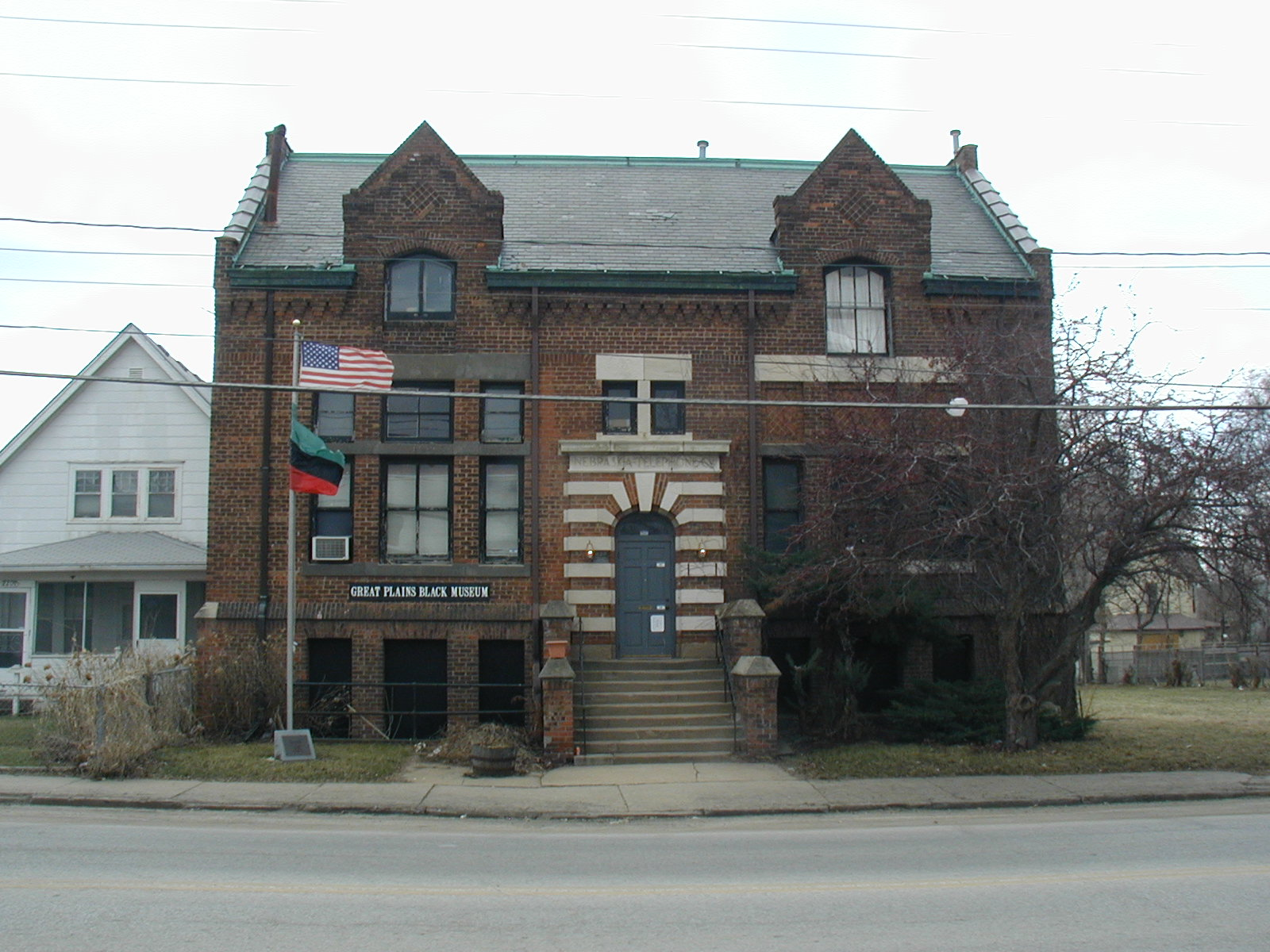
The 1908 Webster Telephone Exchange in North Omaha shows a change in styles.

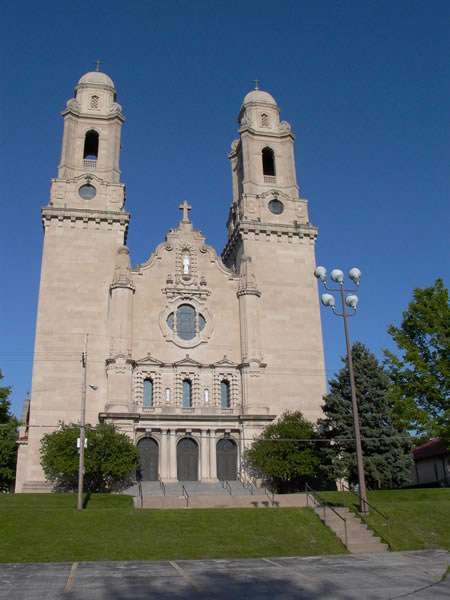
St. Cecilia took more than 50 years to construct.

Notable designs by Thomas Rogers Kimball alphabetical order
Name	Built	Location	Notes
All Saint's Episcopal Church	1906	26th and Dewey Avenue	Kimball took the contract for designing this building away from John McDonald, another influential architect in Omaha, after a fire destroyed the original church. He designed a parish house and church, both of which were demolished in 1966 when the church moved to another location.
Battle Mountain Sanitarium	1898	Hot Springs, South Dakota	Designed in a star pattern for sun and air, today the building is known as the Domiciliary at the Hot Springs Medical Center of the VA Black Hills Health Care System.
Breckenridge/Gordon Residence	1909	3611 Jackson Street, Omaha	A family residence listed on the NRHP.
Burlington Headquarters Building	1879	1002-1006 Farnam Street, Omaha	This Downtown Omaha landmark sits on the Gene Leahy Mall, and was rehabilitated by Kimball in 1879. It was added to the National Register of Historic Places, or NRHP.
Burlington Station	1900	First Street and St. Joseph's Avenue, Hastings, Nebraska	Added to the NRHP in 1978. It was renovated in 1966 and 2000.
Burlington Train Station	1898	925 South 10th Street, Omaha	Added to the NRHP in 1974; currently used as the studio facility for Omaha's ABC affiliate, television station KETV (channel 7).
Dome Lake Club	1895	56 Dee Drive, Sheridan, Wyoming	This private fishing club is located near the Bighorn National Forest.
F.P. Kirkendall House	1901	3727 Jackson Street, Omaha	Ranking among the largest of the Gold Coast Historic District homes, this house has won several awards.
Electricity Palace	1903	Designed for the 1904 Louisiana Purchase Exposition in St. Louis	It covered nine acres and cost over $400,000. Crowning the great towers were heroic groups of statuary typifying the various attributes of electricity.
Gallagher Residence	1904	513 South 38th Street, Omaha	A prominent home throughout its life, it was designed for Ben Gallagher, the founder of the Paxton and Gallagher Wholesale Grocery Company in pioneer Omaha. It was demolished in 1967.
Hall County Courthouse	1904	422 West 1st Street, Grand Island, Nebraska	This building serves Hall County government offices, and was added to the NRHP in 1977.
Hotel Fontenelle	1914	1806 Douglas Street, Omaha	This building was demolished in 1983.
Keystone Community Church	1908	Keystone, Nebraska	The church has a Catholic altar on one end, a Protestant lectern at the other, and hinged pews to make the seats reversible.
Mary Rogers Kimball House	1905	2236 St. Mary's Avenue, Omaha	Built close to her son's home, this house is the only remaining example of the numerous upscale homes that used to sit on St. Mary's. It is listed on the NRHP.
Medical Arts Building	1926	17th and Dodge Streets, Omaha	Originally designed as an all-in-one medical office and laboratory facility, Kimball withdrew when the builders went bankrupt. He eventually sold the plans to John McDonald, a local competitor. The building was demolished in 1999.
Monmouth Park School	1903	4508 North 33rd Street, Omaha	Added to the NRHP in 1983, this building was converted to apartments in 1985.
Nash Block	1905	902 Farnam Street, Omaha	Added to the NRHP in 1985, this building is currently apartments.
Nebraska Telephone Company Building	1894	128-130 S. 13th Street, Lincoln, Nebraska	Listed on the NRHP.
Old Administration Building	1903	University of Nebraska campus	This building was razed in 1963.
Omaha Club	1895	2002 Douglas Street, Omaha	The most historically significant social club in the City of Omaha, having entertained five sitting U.S. presidents. Razed in 1965.
Omaha Public Library	1892	1823 Harney Street, Omaha	Called "one of the most significant structures in Nebraska", this building sits on land originally donated to the city by local real estate mogul Byron Reed. It was Kimball's first commission in Omaha, and served as the public library in Omaha until 1977, when afterwards it was converted to offices, in which capacity it still serves. It is listed on the NRHP.
Oscar Roeser House	1908	721 W. Koenig Street, Grand Island, Nebraska	
Packers National Bank	1907	4939 South 24th Street, Omaha	Located in the South Omaha Main Street Historic District, this building serves as offices today, and is listed on the NRHP individually.
Park School	1918	1320 South 29th Street, Omaha	Named for its proximity to Hanscom Park, this building was sold by Omaha Public Schools in 1988 and converted to apartments.
Paxton and Gallagher Warehouse	1908	901-909 Jones Street, Omaha	Currently serves as apartments.
Richard R. Kimball Residence	1901	1235 Park Wild Avenue, Omaha	Built for Kimball's brother, a prominent automobile dealer, this house was demolished in the mid 1960s.
Roosevelt Memorial Obelisk	1931	Marias Pass, Glacier County, Montana, U.S.	A memorial to President Theodore Roosevelt was constructed along the Continental Divide at the top of the Marias Pass.
Sheridan Inn	1893	856 Broadway Street, Sheridan, Wyoming	Kimball designed it after a hunting lodge in Scotland. Built in 1893 for the Chicago, Burlington, and Quincy Railroad as part of its development program in Wyoming associated with extension of the railway. Equipped with the first bathtubs and electric lights in that part of Wyoming, the inn was considered the "finest hotel" between Chicago and San Francisco. It was declared a National Historic Landmark in 1964.
St. Cecilia Cathedral	1905	701 North 40th Street, Omaha	Completed in 1959, Kimball's original designs were altered by later architects.
St. Francis Cabrini Church	1908	1335 South 10th Street, Omaha	Built as St. Philomena's Cathedral, this structure retained cathedral status until St. Cecilia's Cathedral was substantially completed around 1916.
St. Philomena's Catholic Church	1908	1335 South 10th Street	Considered one of Kimball's best works, this building is listed on the NRHP, and is currently named St. Francis Cabrini.
Second Church of Christ Scientist (now Ivy Hotel)	1930	1115 2nd Avenue South, Minneapolis, Minnesota	A locally designated landmark, this building is a rare example of the Ziggurat form in the city.
South Omaha Public Library	1904	2302 M Street, Omaha	This Carnegie library was designed to be reminiscent of a small Italian Renaissance palazzo. It was demolished in 1953 and replaced with a modern library at the same location.
Thomas R. Kimball Residence	1905	2450 St. Mary's Avenue, Omaha	Curved drives, elevated gardens and illustrious landscaping surrounded this multi-towered, seven-chimneyed building with design elements from many styles. It was demolished six years after Kimball's death and replaced with a grocery store and parking lot.
Wattles House	1895	320 South 37th Street, Omaha	Banker Gurdon Wattles lived here for 25 years, during which time he planned the Trans-Mississippi and International Exposition, among his many ventures.
Webster Telephone Exchange Building	1907	2213 Lake Street, Omaha	Serving as a telephone exchange, emergency morgue, community center, and museum has not saved this building from disrepair.
William F. Baxter Residence	1926	410 South Elwood Boulevard	One of the last large residential plans by Kimball before he died, this home is on the University of Nebraska at Omaha campus and is threatened by a student housing project.

Kimball also designed the original Omaha World-Herald building, the First National Bank in Grand Island and the Hastings, Nebraska Railroad Station. At the Trans-Mississippi and International Exposition he prepared the layout for the park and designed the Arch of the States, the Administration Building, Transportation Building, and the Boys' and Girls' Building.

== See also ==
- John Latenser, Sr.
- Joseph P. Guth
- Architecture in Omaha, Nebraska
- Omaha Landmarks
