= Jacinto (surname) =

Jacinto is a surname. Notable people with the surname include:

- Andreia Jacinto (born 2002), Portuguese footballer
- António Jacinto (1924–1991), Angolan poet and politician
- Bayani Jacinto (born 1969), Filipino lawyer and jurist
- Emilio Jacinto (1875–1899), Filipino general during the Philippine Revolution
- Juan Jacinto (born 1978), Dominican judoka
- Manny Jacinto, Filipino-Canadian actor
- Ramon Jacinto (born 1945), Filipino businessman, musician, radio TV personality and former government official
- Norrie Jacinto (1945-2017), Filipino singer, aka the Neil Sedaka of the Philippines
