= Thomas Lord Kimball =

American railroad executive (1831–1899)

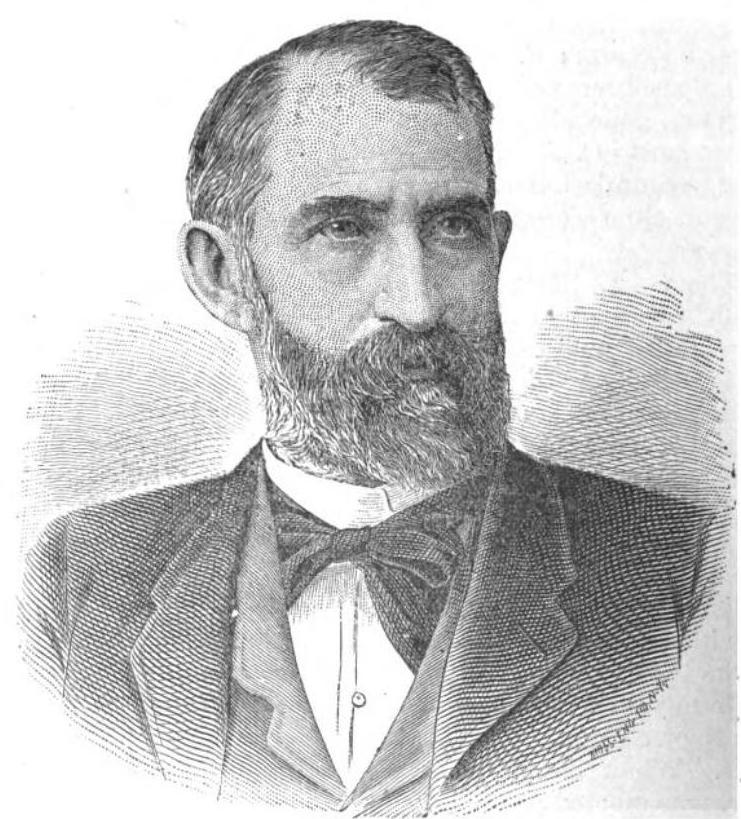
- Portrait in History of Omaha from the Pioneer Days to the Present Time, 1889
- Born: October 1, 1831; Buxton, Maine, U.S.
- Died: October 9, 1899 (aged 68); Omaha, Nebraska, U.S.
- Spouse: Mary Porter Rogers (m. 1854)
- Children: 4, including Thomas Rogers

Thomas Lord Kimball (October 1, 1831 – October 9, 1899) was an American railroad executive. Born in Buxton, Maine, he worked various jobs before becoming an agent of the Pennsylvania Railroad Company in 1860. He was appointed to various positions in the company, before moving to Omaha, Nebraska, in 1871 to work for Union Pacific Railroad. From there, he climbed the ranks and was eventually promoted to vice president. Kimball retired in 1897 and died in 1899.

In 1888, Kimball County, Nebraska, was formed and named after Kimball. While Kimball was a prominent figure in Omaha, eventually his fame was eclipsed by his son Thomas Rogers Kimball, who became a well-known architect.

== Early life and career ==
Thomas Lord Kimball was born on a farm in Buxton, Maine, on October 1, 1831. His grandfather, Joshua Kimball, fought in the American Revolutionary War, while his father, Amos Kimball, fought in the War of 1812. After the war, Amos married Johanna Currier, and moved to Buxton to begin farming.

Kimball grew up in Buxton, living with his parents. Sources disagree on how Kimball spent his teenage years. According to an 1888 profile in the Daily True American and a biography in History of Omaha from the Pioneer Days to the Present Time (1889), Kimball lived with his parents until the age of seventeen, at which point he studied academically until the age of twenty-one, and taught school during his summer vacations. On the contrary, his biographies in History of the City of Omaha, Nebraska and South Omaha (1894) and in Omaha: The Gate City and Douglas County Nebraska (1917) claim that he had planned to attend college at the age of sixteen, but was ill for a period of two years, preventing him from doing so, and makes no mention of him teaching school during his summers, instead claiming that he worked at a jewelry firm based in Saco, Maine, (though most of his work at the firm was done in Biddeford, Maine). (Note: It is unclear which account of Kimball's life during this period is more accurate. Articles from the time in The Union and Eastern Journal indicate Kimball was a partner at a jewelry firm (Cleaves & Kimball) in Biddeford in 1854, when Kimball would have been 23.)

== Work with railroads ==
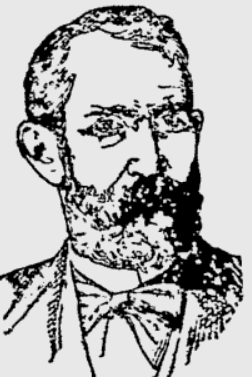
1888 portrait in the Daily True American

After touring the American West in 1856, he and his wife moved to the Western Reserve area of Ohio in 1857, before moving to Cincinnati in 1859. Kimball initially worked as a journalist for an amateur newspaper while in Ohio. In 1859, he wrote a series of articles about the Western United States and the Pennsylvania Railroad Company. This attracted the interest of the Pennsylvania Railroad Company, which subsequently hired him in 1860. Kimball worked as a passenger agent for the railroad until 1871.

Thomas A. Scott, an associate of Kimball, was elected as the president of the Union Pacific Railroad in March 1871. Scott appointed Kimball as the general passenger and ticket agent of Union Pacific, and Kimball moved to Omaha, Nebraska. Kimball served various roles at Union Pacific. After ten years as the general passenger and ticket agent, he became an assistant general manager. After four years in that role, he became the general traffic manager. On September 1, 1887 Kimball became the assistant of Union Pacific's first vice president Thomas J. Potter who died on March 9, 1888, after which Kimball became the third vice president of the company.

Kimball also represented Union Pacific in the Union Depot Company, a partnership between Union Pacific and the Chicago, Burlington and Quincy Railroad to build union stations in downtown Omaha and Council Bluffs, Iowa. Kimball eventually served as the president of the Union Depot Company. He faced some controversy in this role. In 1890, voters in the city of Omaha had approved $150,000 in bonds to build the union depot. However, after Union Pacific acted to block the Milwaukee and Rock Island railroads from entering the city, Ernest Stuht filed suit against the city of Omaha, many of its officials, the Union Depot Company, and Kimball, seeking to block the bonds. Regarding this, the Omaha World-Herald criticized Kimball in 1892 for siding with the interests of Union Pacific over those of the city of Omaha. The company lost its cases in court, and was eventually liquidated in 1897.

Kimball left Union Pacific in 1897 when the company went into receivership.

== Personal life ==
In 1854, Kimball married Mary Porter Rogers, the daughter of Nathaniel Peabody Rogers. They had four children, including Thomas Rogers Kimball and Frances Kimball. Thomas Rogers Kimball became a notable architect in the Omaha area, designing buildings such as the Omaha Public Library, with his fame eventually eclipsing that of his father. Frances Kimball married George Ward Holdrege, another prominent railroad executive.

== Death and legacy ==
In July 1899, Kimball fell while walking around his property in Omaha. He suffered from his injuries for about two weeks, before dying unexpectedly of heart failure on October 9, 1899.

Kimball, Nebraska, and surrounding Kimball County, Nebraska, were both named after Kimball. The city of Kimball was known as Antelopeville when Kimball visited in 1884, but the United States Postal Service determined the name ambiguous due to the existence of Antelope, Nebraska, so it was renamed in honor of Kimball in 1885. Kimball County was formed in 1888 from part of Cheyenne County, along with Banner County and Scotts Bluff County.
