= List of county courthouses in Iowa =

This is a list of Iowa county courthouses. Each county in Iowa has a city that is the county seat where the county government resides, including a county courthouse, except for Lee County, which has two county seats and two county courthouses.

Picture	Courthouse	County	Location
	Adair County Courthouse	Adair County	41°18′17″N 94°27′35″W; Iowa Ave. and 1st St. Greenfield, Iowa
Adams County IA Courthouse	Adams County Courthouse	Adams County	40°59′28.43″N 94°44′5.20″W; 500 9th St. Corning, Iowa
Allamakee County Courthouse	Allamakee County Courthouse	Allamakee County	43°16′13″N 91°28′32″W; 110 Allamakee St. Waukon, Iowa
Appanoose County Courthouse	Appanoose County Courthouse	Appanoose County	40°44′1.58″N 92°52′28.09″W; 201 North 12th Street; Centerville, Iowa
Audubon County IA Courthouse	Audubon County Courthouse	Audubon County	41°43′17.49″N 94°55′46.56″W; 318 Leroy St. Audubon, Iowa
Benton County IA Courthouse	Benton County Courthouse	Benton County	42°10′5.56″N 92°01′24.83″W; 111 E. 4th St. Vinton, Iowa
	Black Hawk County Courthouse	Black Hawk County	42°29′55″N 92°19′59″W; 316 East 5th Street; Waterloo, Iowa
	Boone County Courthouse	Boone County	42°3′32″N 93°54′22″W; N. State and W. 2nd Sts. Boone, Iowa
Bremer County IA Courthouse	Bremer County Courthouse	Bremer County	42°43′35.55″N 92°27′54.39″W; 415 E. Bremer Ave. Waverly, Iowa
	Buchanan County Courthouse	Buchanan County	42°28′14″N 91°53′21″W; 210 5th Ave.NE; Independence, Iowa
	Buena Vista County Courthouse	Buena Vista County	42°38′41.77″N 95°11′56.49″W; 215 E. 5th St. Storm Lake, Iowa
Butler County IA Courthouse	Butler County Courthouse	Butler County	42°45′21.86″N 92°47′42.57″W; 428 Sixth St. Allison, Iowa
Calhoun County IA Courthouse	Calhoun County Courthouse	Calhoun County	42°23′42.66″N 94°38′2.73″W; 416 Fourth St. Rockwell City, Iowa
Carroll County IA Courthouse	Carroll County Courthouse	Carroll County	42°03′52.79″N 94°52′0.47″W; 114 E. 6th St. Carroll, Iowa
	Cass County Courthouse	Cass County	41°24′12″N 95°0′52″W; 5 W. 7th St. Atlantic, Iowa
Cedar County IA Courthouse	Cedar County Courthouse	Cedar County	41°46′9.93″N 91°07′39.86″W; 400 Cedar St. Tipton, Iowa
Cerro Gordo County IA Courthouse	Cerro Gordo County Courthouse	Cerro Gordo County	43°09′15.35″N 93°12′11.33″W; 220 North Washington Ave. Mason City, Iowa
	Cherokee County Courthouse	Cherokee County	42°45′0.61″N 95°33′21.52″W; 520 W. Main St. Cherokee, Iowa
Chickasaw County Courthouse	Chickasaw County Courthouse	Chickasaw County	43°9′36″N 92°18′49″W; Prospect St. at Locust Ave. New Hampton, Iowa
Clarke County Courthouse	Clarke County Courthouse	Clarke County	41°2′3″N 93°45′59.8″W; 100 S. Main St. Osceola, Iowa
Clay County IA Courthouse	Clay County Courthouse	Clay County	43°8′31″N 95°8′52″W; 4th St. and 3rd Ave. Spencer, Iowa
	Clayton County Courthouse	Clayton County	42°51′19″N 91°24′12″W; 111 High St. Elkader, Iowa
Clinton County Courthouse	Clinton County Courthouse	Clinton County	41°51′2″N 90°11′17″W; 612 N. 2nd St. Clinton, Iowa
Crawford County Courthouse	Crawford County Courthouse	Crawford County	42°1′2.2218″N 95°21′24.2742″W; Broadway between Ave. B and Ave. C Denison, Iowa
	Dallas County Courthouse	Dallas County	41°37′4″N 94°1′3″W; Town Square; Adel, Iowa
Davis County Courthouse	Davis County Courthouse	Davis County	40°45′10″N 92°25′1″W; 100 Courthouse Sq. Bloomfield, Iowa
Decatur County IA Courthouse	Decatur County Courthouse	Decatur County	40°44′26″N 93°44′46″W; 9th St. Leon, Iowa
	Delaware County Courthouse	Delaware County	42°29′2″N 91°26′34″W; Main St. Manchester, Iowa
	Des Moines County Courthouse	Des Moines County	40°48′42″N 91°5′59″W; 513 N. Main St. Burlington, Iowa
Dickinson County Courthouse	Dickinson County Courthouse	Dickinson County	43°25′19.52″N 95°06′12.11″W; 1802 Hill Ave. Spirit Lake, Iowa
Dubuque County Courthouse	Dubuque County Courthouse	Dubuque County	42°30′3.72″N 90°39′51.58″W; 720 Central Ave. Dubuque, Iowa
Emmet County IA Courthouse	Emmet County Courthouse	Emmet County	43°24′12.08″N 94°50′9.78″W; 609 1st Ave N Estherville, Iowa
Fayette County Courthouse	Fayette County Courthouse	Fayette County	42°57′38″N 91°48′21″W; Pine St. West Union, Iowa
	Floyd County Courthouse	Floyd County	43°03′52″N 92°40′54″W; 101 South Main Street; Charles City, Iowa
Franklin County Courthouse	Franklin County Courthouse	Franklin County	42°44′29″N 93°12′32″W; Central Ave. and 1st St., NW. Hampton, Iowa
	Fremont County Courthouse	Fremont County	40°44′51.44″N 95°38′48.87″W; Clay Street; Sidney, Iowa
	Greene County Courthouse	Greene County	42°0′57″N 94°22′26″W; E. Lincoln Way and Chestnut St. Jefferson, Iowa
	Grundy County Courthouse	Grundy County	42°21′39.44″N 92°46′23.56″W; Grundy Ave. Grundy Center, Iowa
Carroll County IA Courthouse	Guthrie County Courthouse	Guthrie County	41°40′42.79″N 94°30′6.55″W; 200 N 5th St. Guthrie Center, Iowa
Hamilton County IA Courthouse	Hamilton County Courthouse	Hamilton County	42°27′12.28″N 93°48′53.63″W; 2300 Superior St. Webster City, Iowa
	Hancock County Courthouse	Hancock County	43°5′47″N 93°36′4″W; State St. Garner, Iowa
Hardin County IA Courthouse	Hardin County Courthouse	Hardin County	42°21′32″N 93°5′45″W; 1215 Edgington Ave. Eldora, Iowa
Harrison County IA Courthouse	Harrison County Courthouse	Harrison County	41°38′36.91″N 95°47′23.26″W; 111 N. 2nd Ave. Logan, Iowa
Henry County Courthouse	Henry County Courthouse	Henry County	40°57′56″N 91°33′12″W; Washington St. Mount Pleasant, Iowa
Howard County Courthouse	Howard County Courthouse	Howard County	43°22′26″N 92°7′3″W; 137 N Elm St. Cresco, Iowa
Humboldt County Courthouse	Humboldt County Courthouse	Humboldt County	42°43′21″N 94°12′58″W; 203 Main St. Dakota City, Iowa
Ida County IA Courthouse	Ida County Courthouse	Ida County	42°20′31″N 95°28′2″W; 401 Moorehead St. Ida Grove, Iowa
Iowa County Courthouse	Iowa County Courthouse	Iowa County	41°47′53″N 92°4′14″W; 888 Court Ave. Marengo, Iowa
	Jackson County Courthouse	Jackson County	42°04′08.2″N 90°40′02.31″W; 201 W. Platt St. Maquoketa, Iowa
Jasper County Courthouse	Jasper County Courthouse	Jasper County	41°42′0″N 93°3′15″W; 1st Ave. between W. 1st St. & W. 2nd Sts. Newton, Iowa
Jefferson County Courthouse	Jefferson County Courthouse	Jefferson County	41°0′37″N 91°57′55″W; 51 W. Briggs Ave. Fairfield, Iowa
Johnson County Courthouse	Johnson County Courthouse	Johnson County	41°39′22″N 91°32′7″W; 417 S. Clinton St. Iowa City, Iowa
	Jones County Courthouse	Jones County	42°6′34″N 91°17′24″W; 500 W. Main St. Anamosa, Iowa
Keokuk County Courthouse	Keokuk County Courthouse	Keokuk County	41°20′0″N 92°12′16″W; 101 S. Main St. Sigourney, Iowa
Kossuth County IA Courthouse	Kossuth County Courthouse	Kossuth County	43°04′9.48″N 94°14′18.70″W; 114 W State St. Algona, Iowa
North Lee County Courthouse	Lee County Courthouse (North)	Lee County	40°37′55″N 91°18′36″W; 701 Ave. F Fort Madison, Iowa
	Lee County Courthouse (South)	Lee County	40°23′51″N 91°23′2″W; 25 N. 7th St. Keokuk, Iowa
	Linn County Courthouse	Linn County	41°58′54″N 91°40′10″W; 50 3rd Avenue Bridge; Cedar Rapids, Iowa
	Louisa County Courthouse	Louisa County	41°10′43″N 91°11′9″W; 117 S. Main St. Wapello, Iowa
Lucas County Courthouse	Lucas County Courthouse	Lucas County	41°0′55″N 93°18′25″W; Courthouse Square; Chariton, Iowa
Lyon County IA Courthouse	Lyon County Courthouse	Lyon County	43°25′48.07″N 96°10′2.99″W; 206 S 2nd Ave. Rock Rapids, Iowa
Madison County Courthouse	Madison County Courthouse	Madison County	41°19′58″N 94°1′1″W; City Square; Winterset, Iowa
Mahaska County Courthouse	Mahaska County Courthouse	Mahaska County	41°17′42″N 93°38′35″W; Market St. and 2nd Ave. Oskaloosa, Iowa
Marion County Courthouse	Marion County Courthouse	Marion County	41°19′6″N 93°5′48″W; Main St. Knoxville, Iowa
Marshall County Courthouse	Marshall County Courthouse	Marshall County	42°2′55″N 92°54′42″W; Courthouse Square; Marshalltown, Iowa
Mills County IA Courthouse	Mills County Courthouse	Mills County	41°2′49.45″N 95°44′33.17″W; 23 N. Vine St. Glenwood, Iowa
Mitchell County Courthouse	Mitchell County Courthouse	Mitchell County	43°16′57″N 92°55′32″W; 500 State St. Osage, Iowa
	Monona County Courthouse	Monona County	42°1′37″N 96°5′31″W; Iowa Ave. Onawa, Iowa
Monroe County Courthouse	Monroe County Courthouse	Monroe County	41°1′45″N 92°48′26″W; Main St. Albia, Iowa
	Montgomery County Courthouse	Montgomery County	41°0′34″N 95°13′50″W; Coolbaugh and 2nd Sts. Red Oak, Iowa
	Muscatine County Courthouse	Muscatine County	41°35′28″N 91°2′35″W; 401 E. 3rd St. Muscatine, Iowa
O'Brien County IA Courthouse	O'Brien County Courthouse	O'Brien County	43°5′12″N 95°37′38″W; 155 S. Hayes Ave. Primghar, Iowa
	Osceola County Courthouse	Osceola County	43°24′7″N 95°44′51″W; 3rd Ave & 8th St. Sibley, Iowa
Page County Courthouse	Page County Courthouse	Page County	40°44′12″N 95°2′13″W; 112 E. Main St. Clarinda, Iowa
Palo Alto County IA Courthouse	Palo Alto County Courthouse	Palo Alto County	43°6′38.11″N 94°40′39.18″W; 1010 Broadway St. Emmetsburg, Iowa
Plymouth County IA Courthouse	Plymouth County Courthouse	Plymouth County	42°47′23.82″N 96°9′41.57″W; 215 4th Ave. SE; Le Mars, Iowa
	Pocahontas County Courthouse	Pocahontas County	42°44′14″N 94°40′7″W; Court Square; Pocahontas, Iowa
Polk County Courthouse	Polk County Courthouse	Polk County	41°35′5″N 93°37′23″W; 500 Mulberry St. Des Moines, Iowa
Pottawattamie County IA Courthouse	Pottawattamie County Courthouse	Pottawattamie County	41°15′26.61″N 95°51′8.95″W; 227 S. 6th St. Council Bluffs, Iowa
Poweshiek County IA Courthouse	Poweshiek County Courthouse	Poweshiek County	41°35′7.33″N 92°31′29.53″W; 302 E. Main St. Montezuma, Iowa
Ringgold County IA Courthouse	Ringgold County Courthouse	Ringgold County	40°42′46″N 94°14′26″W; Madison St. Mount Ayr, Iowa
	Sac County Courthouse	Sac County	42°25′16″N 94°59′33″W; 109 W. Main St. Sac City, Iowa
	Scott County Courthouse	Scott County	41°31′26″N 90°34′45″W; 400 W. 4th St. Davenport, Iowa
Shelby County IA Courthouse	Shelby County Courthouse	Shelby County	41°39′23″N 95°19′9″W; 7th and Court Sts. Harlan, Iowa
	Sioux County Courthouse	Sioux County	43°0′16″N 96°3′30″W; Off Iowa Highway 10; Orange City, Iowa
	Story County Courthouse	Story County	42°0′40.39″N 93°26′32.14″W; 1315 South B Ave. Nevada, Iowa
Tama County Courthouse	Tama County Courthouse	Tama County	41°59′49″N 92°34′39″W; State St. Toledo, Iowa
	Taylor County Courthouse	Taylor County	40°40′01″N 91°43′8″W; 405 Jefferson St. Bedford, Iowa
Union County IA Courthouse	Union County Courthouse	Union County	41°03′36.07″N 94°21′42.67″W; 300 N. Pine St. Creston, Iowa
	Van Buren County Courthouse	Van Buren County	40°44′0″N 91°57′48″W; 904 4th St. Keosauqua, Iowa
	Wapello County Courthouse	Wapello County	41°1′11″N 92°24′38″W; 101 W. 4th St. Ottumwa, Iowa
	Warren County Courthouse	Warren County	41°21′40″N 93°33′41″W; 115 N. Howard Ave. Indianola, Iowa
	Washington County Courthouse	Washington County	41°11′17″N 91°45′6″W; 224 W. Main St. Washington, Iowa
Wayne County IA Courthouse	Wayne County Courthouse	Wayne County	40°45′28.25″N 93°19′3.46″W; 100 S. Franklin St. Corydon, Iowa
	Webster County Courthouse	Webster County	42°30′17″N 94°11′17″W; 701 Central Ave. Fort Dodge, Iowa
	Winnebago County Courthouse	Winnebago County	43°15′47″N 93°38′19″W; J Street; Forest City, Iowa
	Winneshiek County Courthouse	Winneshiek County	43°18′10.1124″N 91°47′16.0656″W; 201 W. Main Street; Decorah, Iowa
	Woodbury County Courthouse	Woodbury County	42°29′49.77″N 96°24′19.89″W; 620 Douglas St. Sioux City, Iowa
	Worth County Courthouse	Worth County	42°26′40″N 93°13′3″W; 1000 Central Ave. Northwood, Iowa
	Wright County Courthouse	Wright County	42°43′56″N 93°43′55″W; Central Ave. Clarion, Iowa
