= First Congregational Church, Former (Sioux City, Iowa) =

- Sioux City Baptist Church
- U.S. National Register of Historic Places
- Location within Iowa Location within the United States
- Location: 1301 Nebraska St. Sioux City, Iowa
- Coordinates: 42°30′15.1″N 96°24′14.3″W
- Area: less than one acre
- Built: 1916-1918
- Architect: William L. Steele
- Architectural style: Prairie School
- NRHP reference No.: 79000953
- Added to NRHP: October 22, 1979

The First Congregational Church, also known as Iglesia Pentecostes Evangelica Principe de Paz, is a house of worship located in Sioux City, Iowa, United States. An architectural rarity, it is one of a small group of churches in the Prairie School style of architecture. Designed primarily in the Prairie style with some eclectic touches by architect William L. Steele, its horizontal lines are emphasized by Roman brick and crisp rectilinear forms. Somewhat at variance are the distinctive dome and the prominent round heads on the windows.

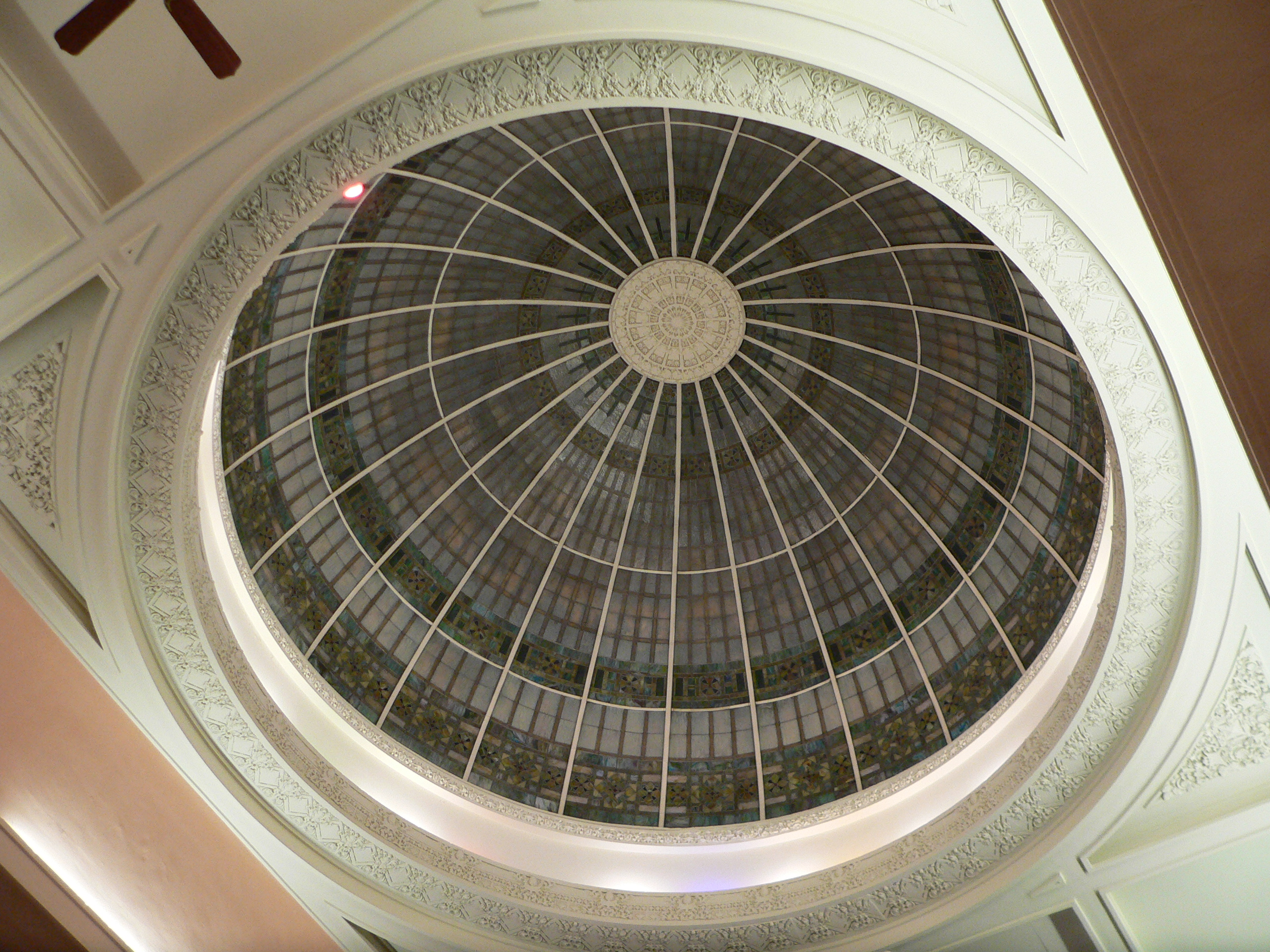
Interior view of the now-sealed dome showing its stained glass, which originally flooded the sanctuary with light.

Fresh from his triumph with the Woodbury County Courthouse in collaboration with George Grant Elmslie, and drawing on lessons learned during that collaboration, Steele built the church in 1916–1918. This church and the courthouse are the only two Prairie style buildings that are known to have a dome.

It was built for a Congregational church that had been established in Sioux City back in 1857, replacing a more traditional church that had burned down in 1916. In 1966, that congregation built a new structure on Hamilton Boulevard. First Congregational Church sold the building to Sioux City Baptist Church c. 1968. It was listed on the National Register of Historic Places in 1979 under that name. In 2009, Sioux City Baptist Church acquired a building on Viking Drive. Most recently, the building has become the Iglesia Evangelica Pentecostes Principe de Paz (Evangelical Pentecostal Church of the Prince of Peace), with services in Spanish aimed at the local Hispanic community.

Due to the need for extensive building restoration and maintenance, the structure has been named to endangered building lists by at least two historic preservation groups.

== See also ==
- William L. Steele
- Prairie School
- Hartington City Hall and Auditorium
- Woodbury County Courthouse
- Unity Temple
- Stewart Memorial Presbyterian Church
- St. John African Methodist Episcopal Church
