= Hartington City Hall and Auditorium =

Building in Hartington, Nebraska, US

- U.S. National Register of Historic Places
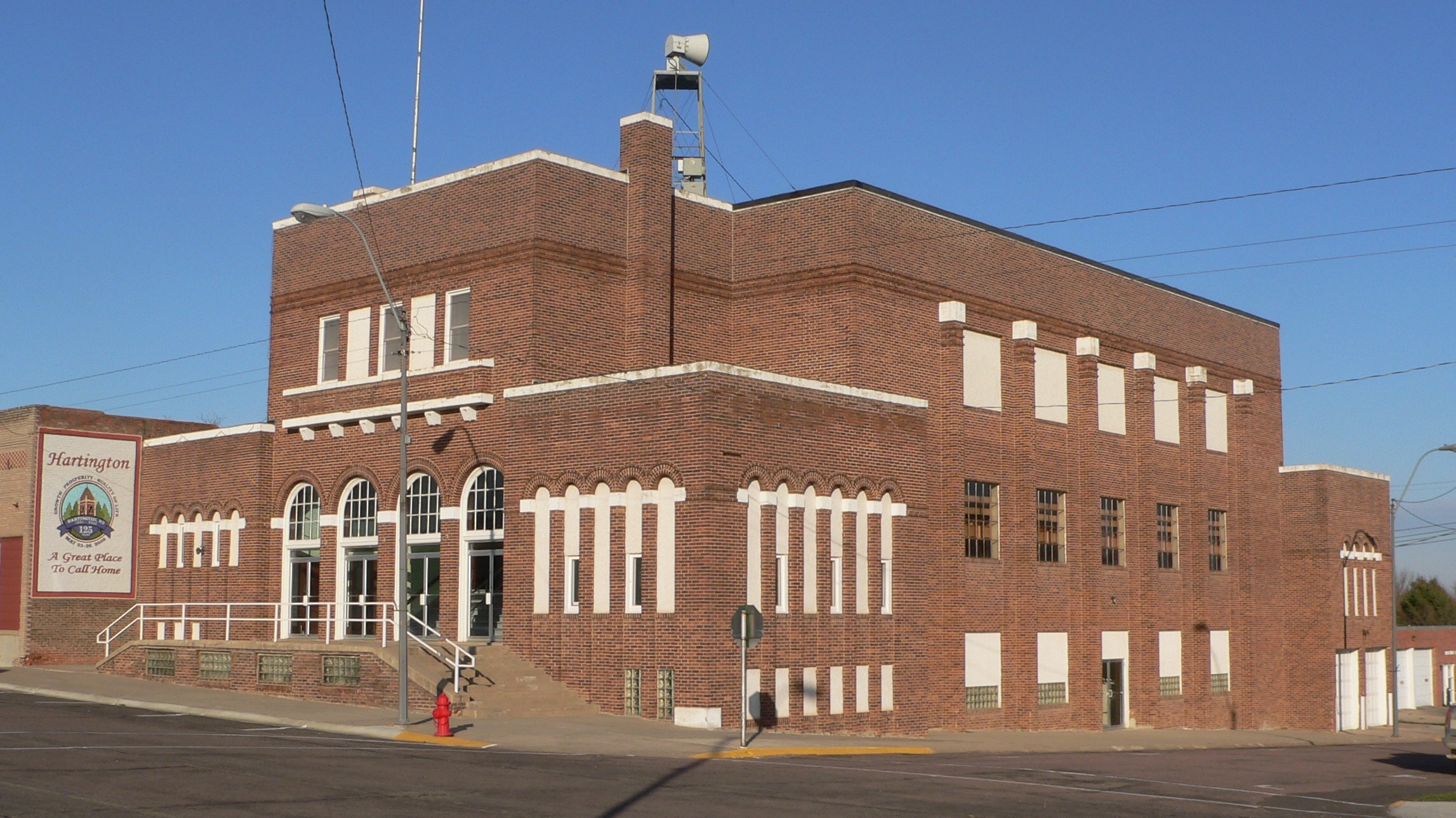
- Hartington City Hall and Auditorium from the southwest, with Broadway Street to the left and Centre Street to the right

- Location within Nebraska
- Location: 101 North Broadway, Hartington, Nebraska; United States (sometimes given as 101 East Centre)
- Coordinates: 42°37′15″N 97°15′49″W
- Built: 1921–23
- Architect: William L. Steele
- Architectural style: Prairie School
- NRHP reference No.: 83001080
- Added to NRHP: July 21, 1983

The Hartington City Hall and Auditorium, also known as the Hartington Municipal Building, is a city-owned, brick-clad, 2-story center in Hartington, Nebraska. It was designed between 1921 and 1923 in the Prairie School style by architect William L. Steele (1875–1949).

Prairie School architecture is rare, and this rural Nebraska specimen is particularly unusual for being designed and built in the 1920s, subsequent to the Prairie Style's rapid loss of popularity after 1914.

The building originally housed city offices, a fire house, an armory, and an auditorium. It is currently used for events, meetings, sports, recreation, and social functions.

== History ==
The land which would become Cedar County, Nebraska was held for thousands of years by various Native American tribes, most recently by the Omaha, with the Ponca somewhat to the west and the Yankton Dakota generally north of the Missouri River. On March 16, 1854, the Omaha were forced to surrender Cedar County and most of the rest of their territory, and were restricted to what by 1882 would become their reservation, now primarily within Thurston County, Nebraska.

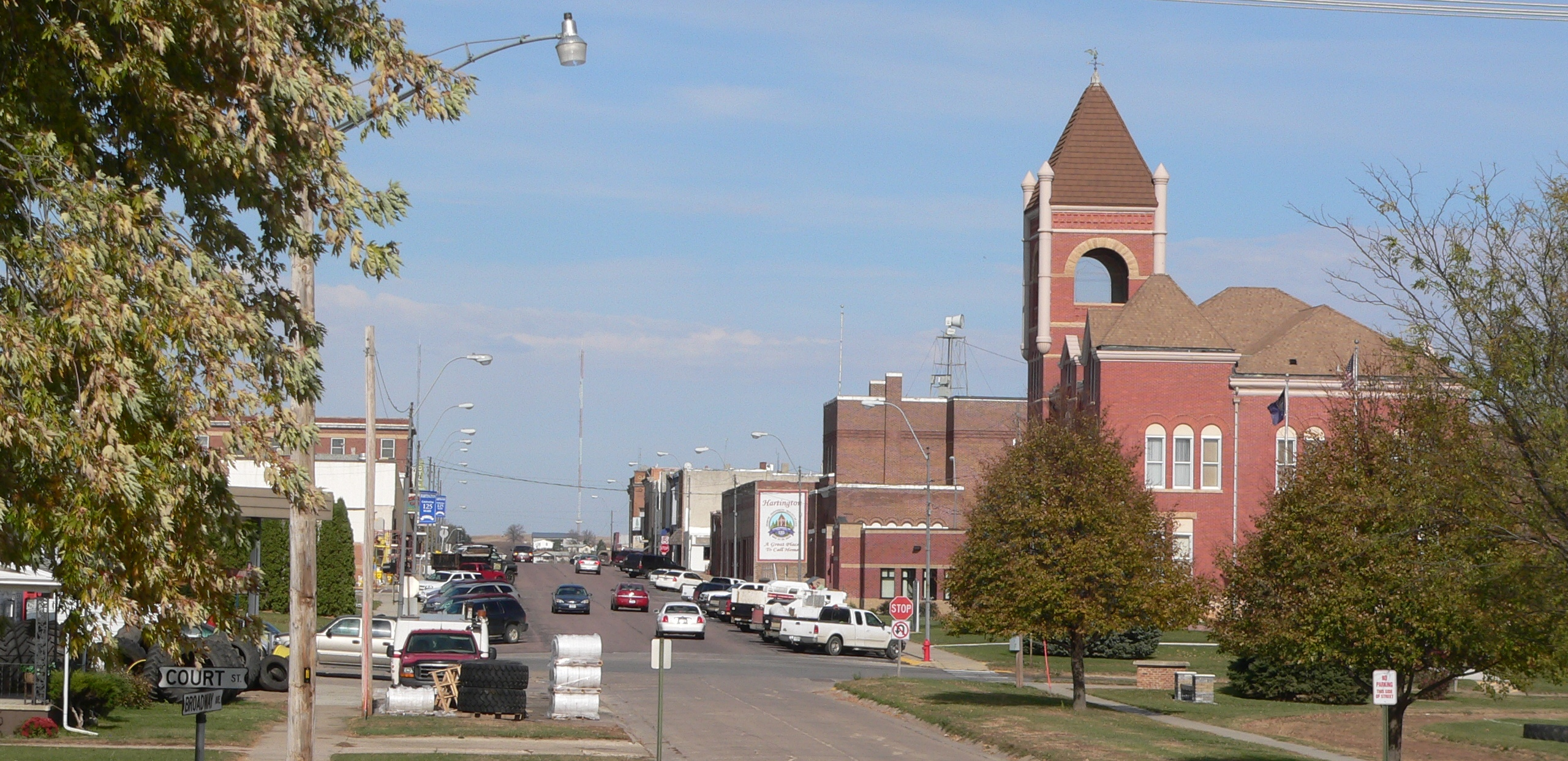
Looking north on Broadway at Hartington's two most prominent brick structures, the Romanesque tower of the Cedar County Courthouse (1891–1892) appears in the right foreground, with the front (west) end of the City Hall and Auditorium across Centre Street north of the courthouse.

This paved the way for the Chicago, St. Paul, Minneapolis and Omaha Railway (later Chicago and North Western Railway) to build westward to Cedar County, which in turn led to the founding of Hartington in 1883. As the railroad reached Cedar County, it first founded Coleridge as one of the locations needed every seven to ten miles (11 to 16 km) for trains to take on water and fuel. After laying down seven more miles of track, the railroad founded Hartington as its next stop, naming it after the English statesman Spencer Cavendish, Marquess of Hartington. In a hotly contested election on January 20, 1885, just less than a year after incorporation, Hartington wrested the county seat from St. Helena, 16 miles (26 km) north on the banks of the Missouri River.

For over 35 years, Hartington had no large indoor venue. In 1919, after a series of prosperous years resulting from high grain prices during and immediately after World War I, voters passed a bond issue of $25,000 for the purpose of erecting a new city hall with multiple uses, including an auditorium. When that amount proved insufficient, a second bond issue of $25,000 was approved in 1920.

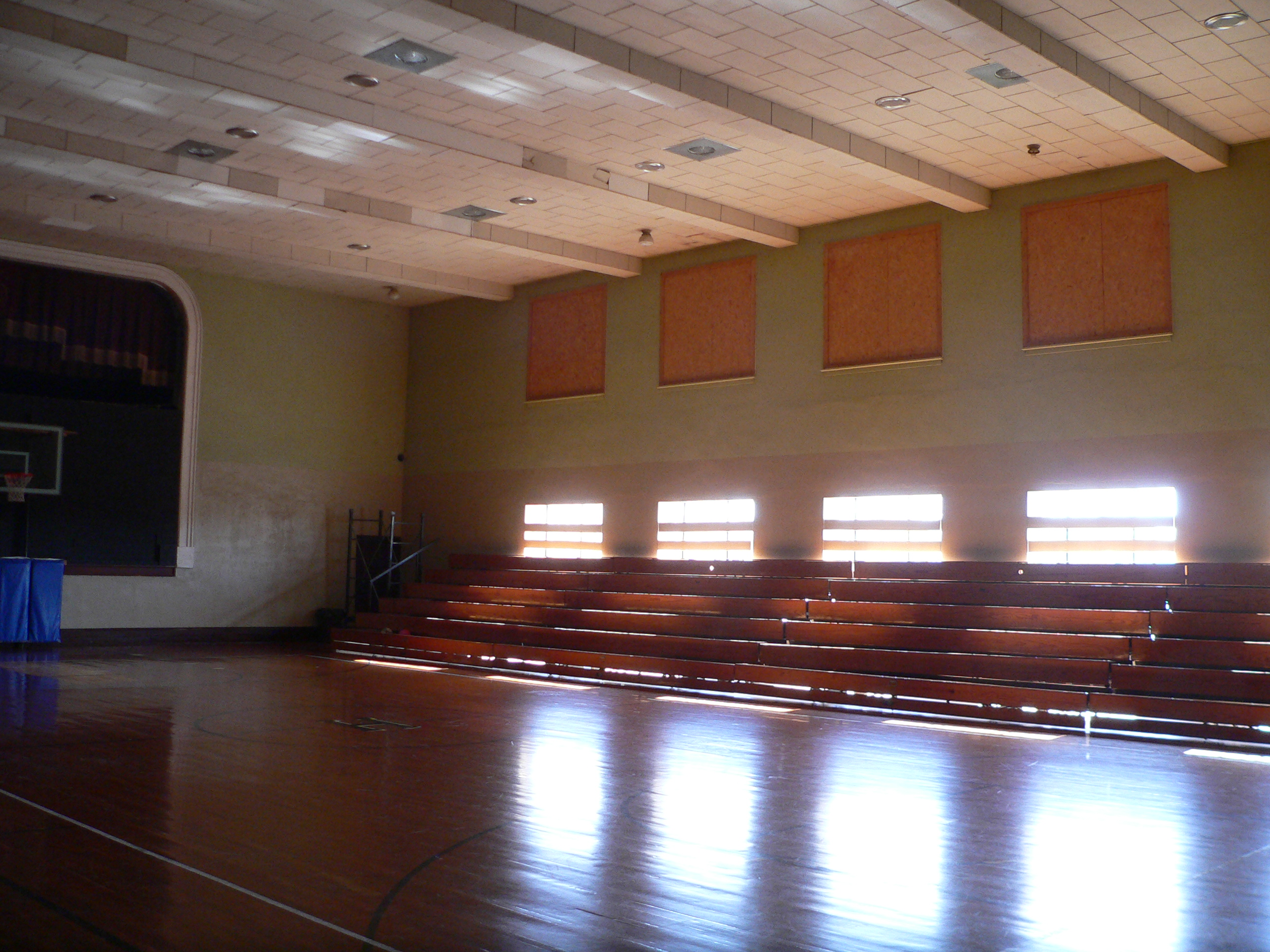
Interior of auditorium looking southeast. The proscenium arch is visible at the east end of the auditorium, behind the basketball hoop. In recent years, the upper band of windows specified by William L. Steele has been filled in.

In 1921, the city council selected William L. Steele to be the architect for the building. Trained at the University of Illinois (now University of Illinois at Urbana–Champaign), Steele had worked as a draftsman in the offices of renowned progressive architect Louis Sullivan from 1887 to 1900, and then in four more conservative offices, before settling in 1904 in Sioux City, Iowa, about 60 miles (97 km) east of Hartington. By the time Hartington chose him, he was the most prominent architect in the region.

Known to work in a number of styles, Steele had recently been concentrating on the Prairie School style of architecture originally developed by Frank Lloyd Wright and others inspired by Sullivan. Upon first arriving in the region, Steele had been unable to convince any of his clients to try his progressive designs. However, beginning with his Prairie-influenced Ben and Harriet Schulein House (Sioux City, 1913), he had begun tentatively moving in the Prairie School direction.

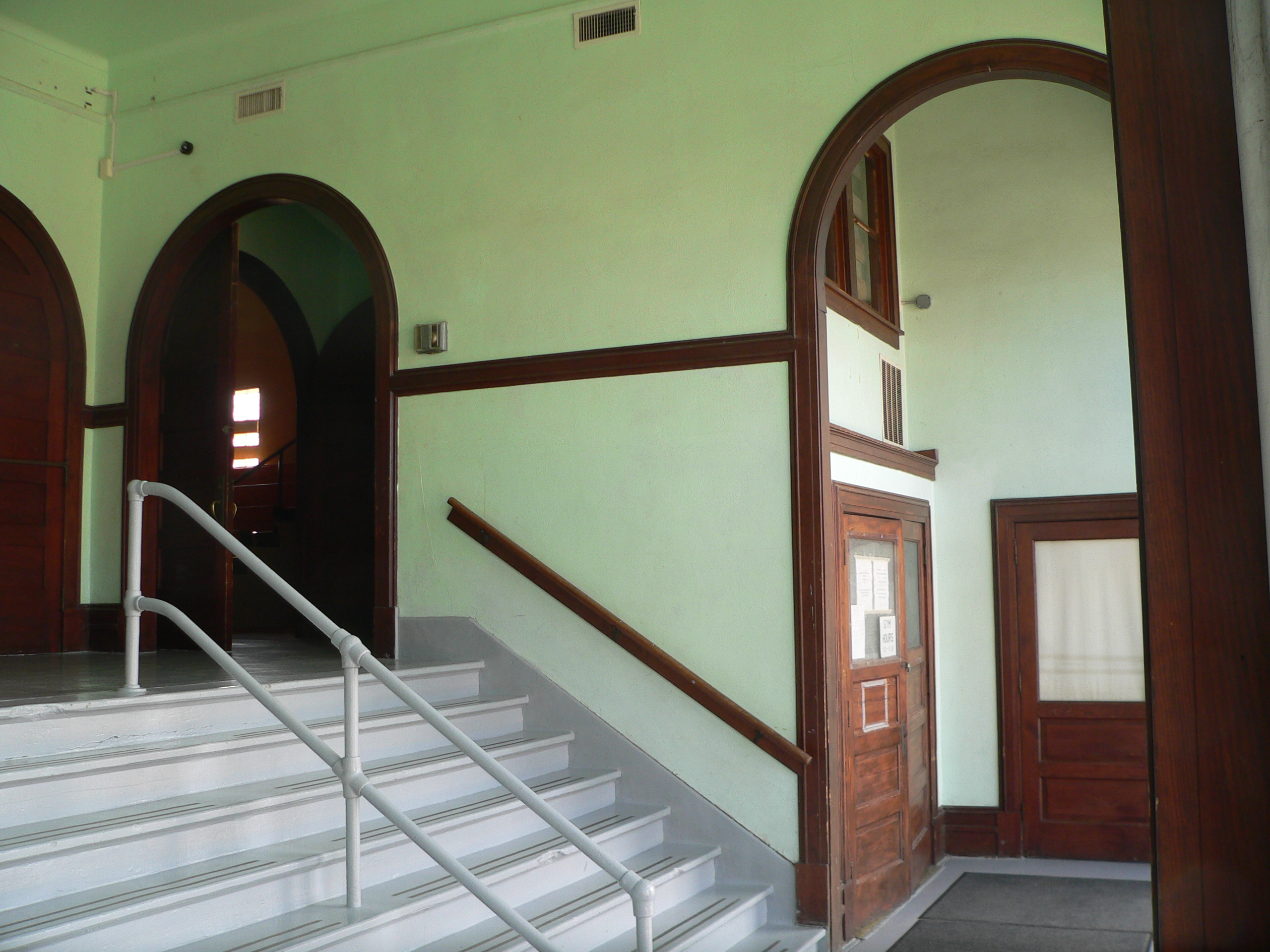
Architect Steele continued the semi-circular motif from the front (west) facade into the doors and archways of the lobby.

Steele's skill with Prairie Style designs and his success in interesting clients had markedly increased as a result of his three-year collaboration with famous Minneapolis-based architect George Grant Elmslie. With Elmslie as principal designer and with some assistance from Elmslie's partner William Gray Purcell, Steele had erected the Prairie Style Woodbury County Courthouse (Sioux City, 1915–1918). About 100 miles (160 kilometers) northwest in Lake Andes, South Dakota, Steele had designed the Charles Mix County Courthouse (1916–1917), also in the Prairie Style. Steele's success is particularly noteworthy since the Prairie School was in decline by this time, losing ground rapidly to a resurgence of more conservative styles after about 1914, and particularly after World War I.

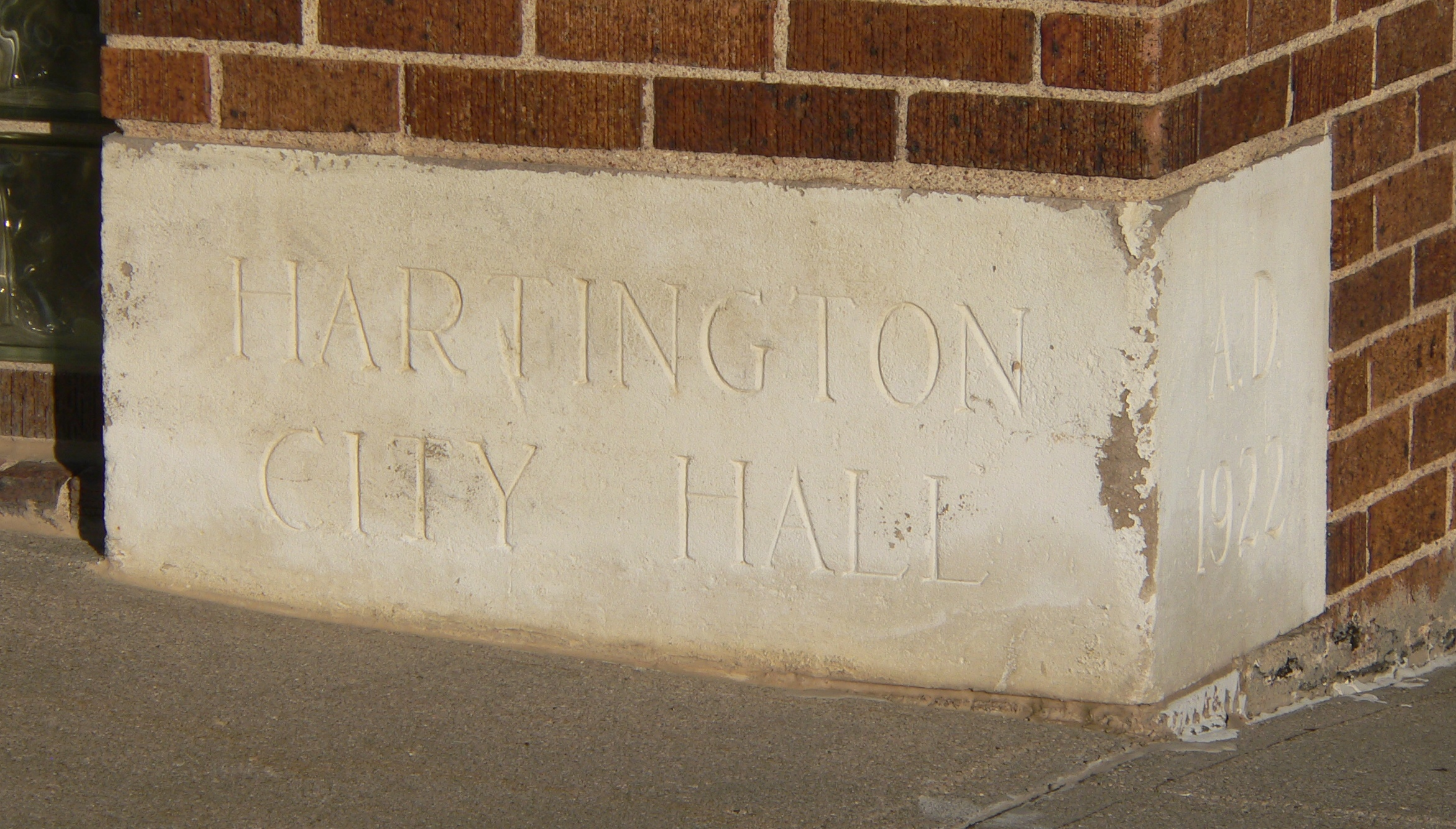
The cornerstone at the southwest corner was laid on June 7, 1922.

The leaders of Hartington would have been familiar with these and other Steele-designed Prairie School style buildings; there would be no surprise in what they were getting. What is surprising is that they agreed to the progressive design. There was considerable public outcry against the Woodbury County Courthouse just five years earlier (including demands from one group for “a courthouse of ordinary and usual design”), but no record of dissent in Hartington. This design “as compared to other known civic buildings in the surrounding counties, stands as a progressive building in an otherwise conservative community.”

Steele drew up initial plans in 1921, then made revisions at the request of the city council. The council accepted the revised plans in January 1922, including space for the auditorium, city offices, fire house, and the National Guard armory that doubled as a gymnasium.

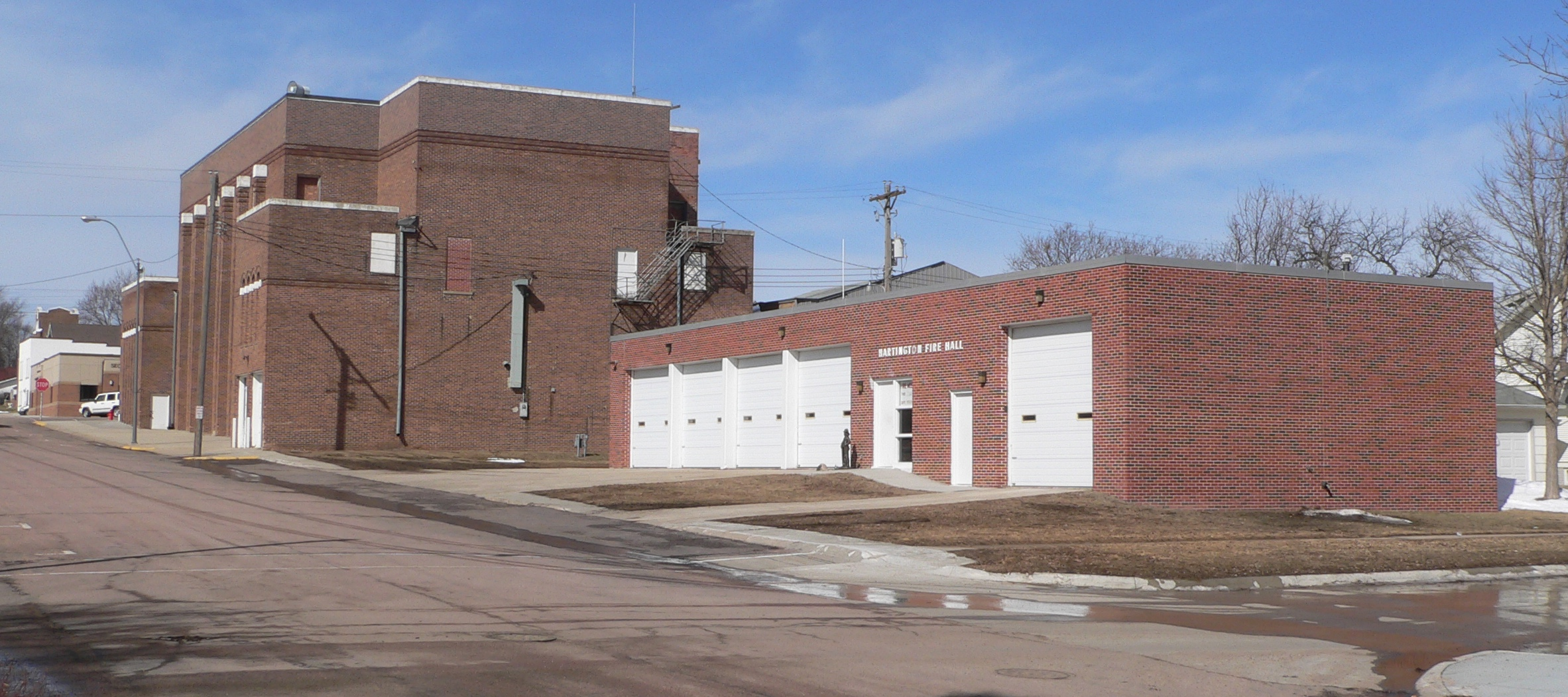
The back of the Hartington City Hall and Auditorium with the new Hartington Fire Hall behind it (east) along Centre Street.

Guarantee Construction Company of Sioux City obtained the contract and began work in the spring of 1922, with the cornerstone laid on June 7. Henry Mahlsted served as Guarantee's superintendent of construction, hiring local labor to do most of the work. The building was completed in January at a cost of $65,000, and the city council officially accepted the building on January 16, 1923. This was followed on January 30 by the official dedication ceremonies, featuring speeches, displays of local talent, and a free dance. On February 1, the Hartington Herald gushed that it had been a “most important event...attended by thousands of people.... The new building is one of the finest of its kind in the state... and will be a credit and an ornament to this community for many years to come.”

Over the decades, the auditorium has hosted dances, athletic competitions, theatrical, musical, and other events. County-wide eighth grade graduation ceremonies were held there until the late 1940s.

The building is still owned by the City of Hartington, and has recently been renovated. Over the years, many of the windows have been filled in with white stucco, and a new entrance door leading to the basement has been cut into the south facade. The upper auditorium level is currently used primarily for basketball, volleyball, and other recreational activities, while the lower armory level now consists of a meeting room with adjacent kitchen, available for rent through the city. The National Guard armory, city offices, and volunteer fire department have relocated. The new fire house is next door to the east on Centre Street.

== Architecture ==
=== Plan and principal facades ===
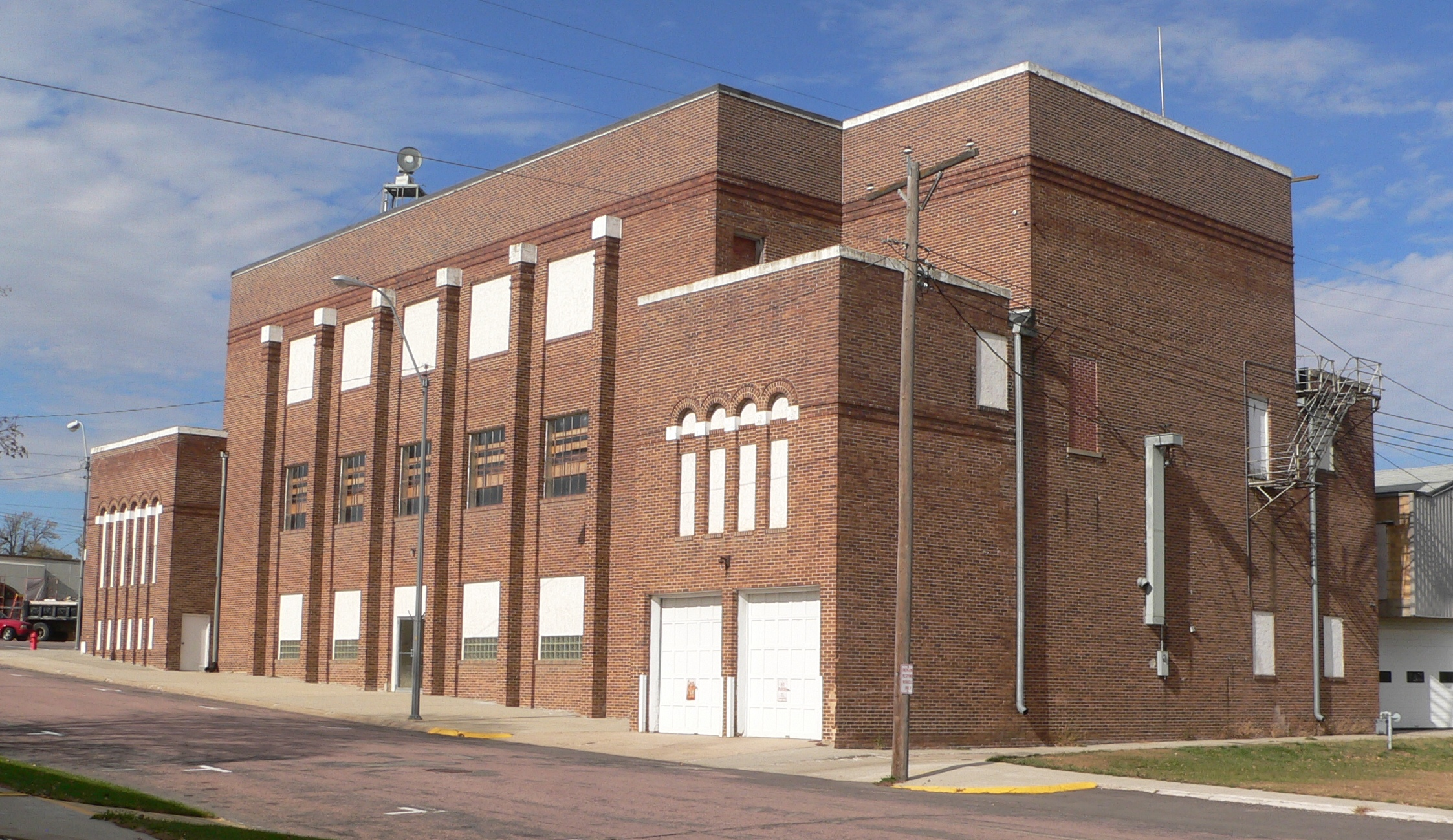
The south facade descends from front (west) to back (east) along Centre Street. The armory was in the basement, city offices were in the wing in front, the auditorium in the main box in the center, with the stage behind it, directly above the fire house (the two large doors).

The Hartington City Hall and Auditorium includes three levels: raised basement partially below grade, main level, and upper level. The basement level and main level are basically rectangular in plan, 75 feet (23 meters) wide (north-south along Broadway) and 130 feet (40 meters) front to back (east-west along Centre). However, the upper level plan is in the shape of a cross, so that the four corners are one story lower and function as wings. The two front wings project forward toward Broadway as well as laterally (north and south). The two rear wings are flush with the back (east) of the building. The southeast wing projects south and contains the two fire house doors, but the northeast wing does not project north. The basement originally contained the armory including officers’ quarters, lockers, supply room, and sleeping facilities for fire fighters, with the firehouse in back under the auditorium stage. The main level accommodated the lobby and city offices in front, the auditorium's hardwood floor taking up the large middle, and the stage in back above the fire house. The cross-shaped upper level included a small space in front above the lobby and the stage fly space in back, but the bulk of it in the middle was simply open to the auditorium.

As situated at the intersection of Broadway and Centre Streets, the two principal facades are the front (west) facing Broadway and the south facade facing across Centre to the brick Romanesque Revival Cedar County Courthouse. The front facade is two stories above the raised basement. However, Centre Street slopes downward as it moves east away from Broadway, so that the basement level is fully above grade at the back, presenting a three-story east facade.

=== Prairie School design ===
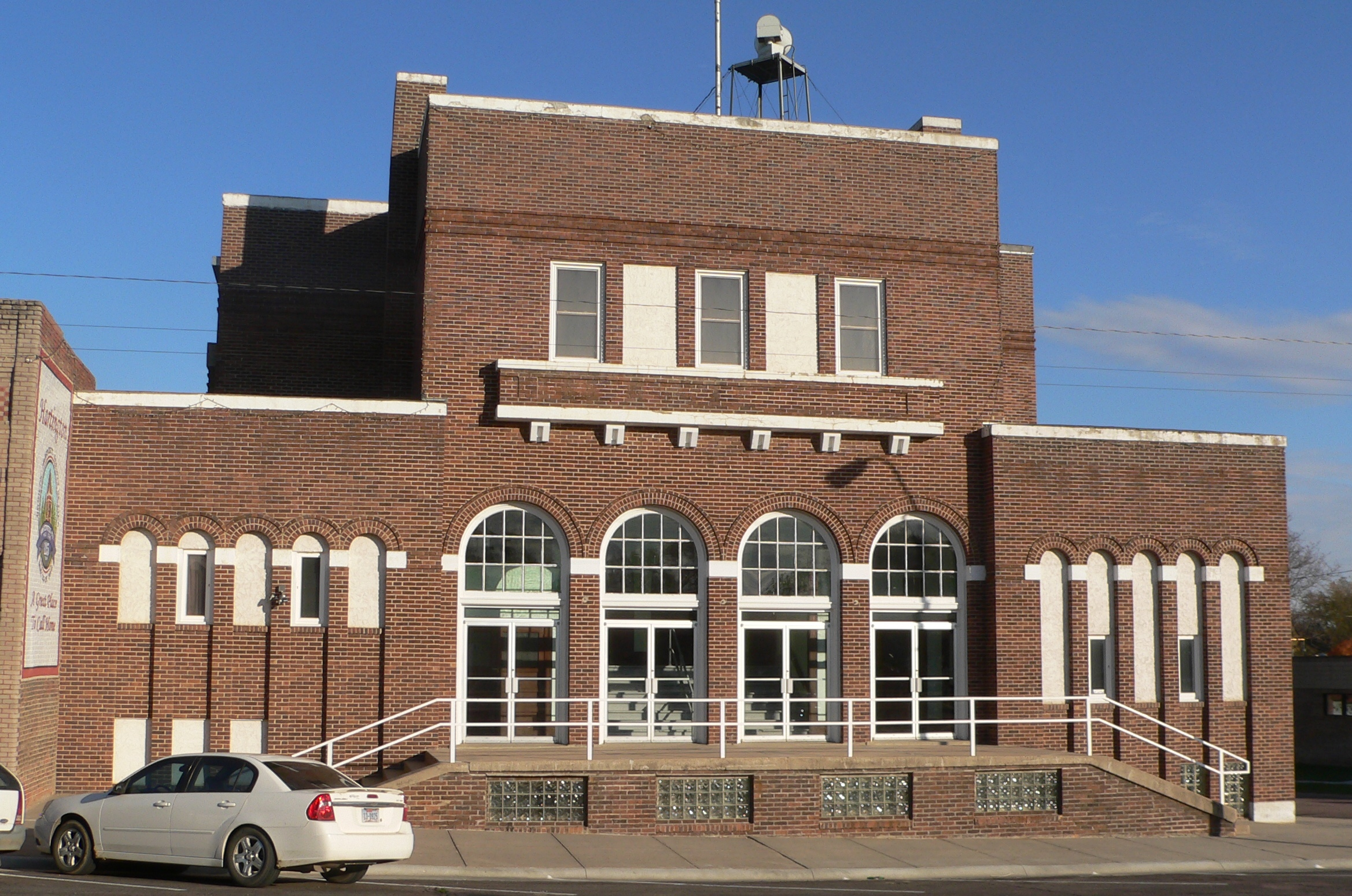
Steele mixed Prairie School and Romanesque Revival features. The crisp, linear geometry of the Prairie Style and the curving geometry of the Romanesque arches are not well resolved, leading to a less integrated front (west) facade.

As designed by William L. Steele, the building exhibits primarily Prairie School attributes, but also includes Romanesque Revival elements such as semi-circular arches on many of the windows and doors. These Romanesque elements are not in harmony with the over-all Prairie thrust of the architecture. Architectural historian Richard Guy Wilson ascribes Steele's use of Romanesque elements to an “attempt to personalize the Prairie School idiom” that began with Steele's First Congregational Church (Sioux City, 1916–1918), where he notes that the “two different geometries are not resolved.” Steele persisted with this approach, to the point that Wilson concludes that the “round headed opening became Steele's motif for public buildings.”

Prairie Style architecture was primarily originated by Frank Lloyd Wright, inspired by the ideas of Louis Sullivan, who served as mentor to Wright, Steele, and many other practitioners of the Prairie School. As developed by Wright, George Grant Elmslie, William Gray Purcell, Marion Mahony, Walter Burley Griffin, and others, the Prairie School of architecture rejected historical revival styles and was inspired by the flat terrain and horizon of the prairies of the Midwest. Prairie Style features crisp, rectilinear geometries with an emphasis on horizontal lines set off by occasional vertical counterpoints. Ornament should develop from the structure itself or express it rather than being added to it as an embellishment, and the architect should rely on construction materials honestly used as themselves, rather than imitating something else. A building's internal structure should determine its exterior and be clearly expressed on the outside, in keeping with Sullivan's famous motto of “form follows function”.

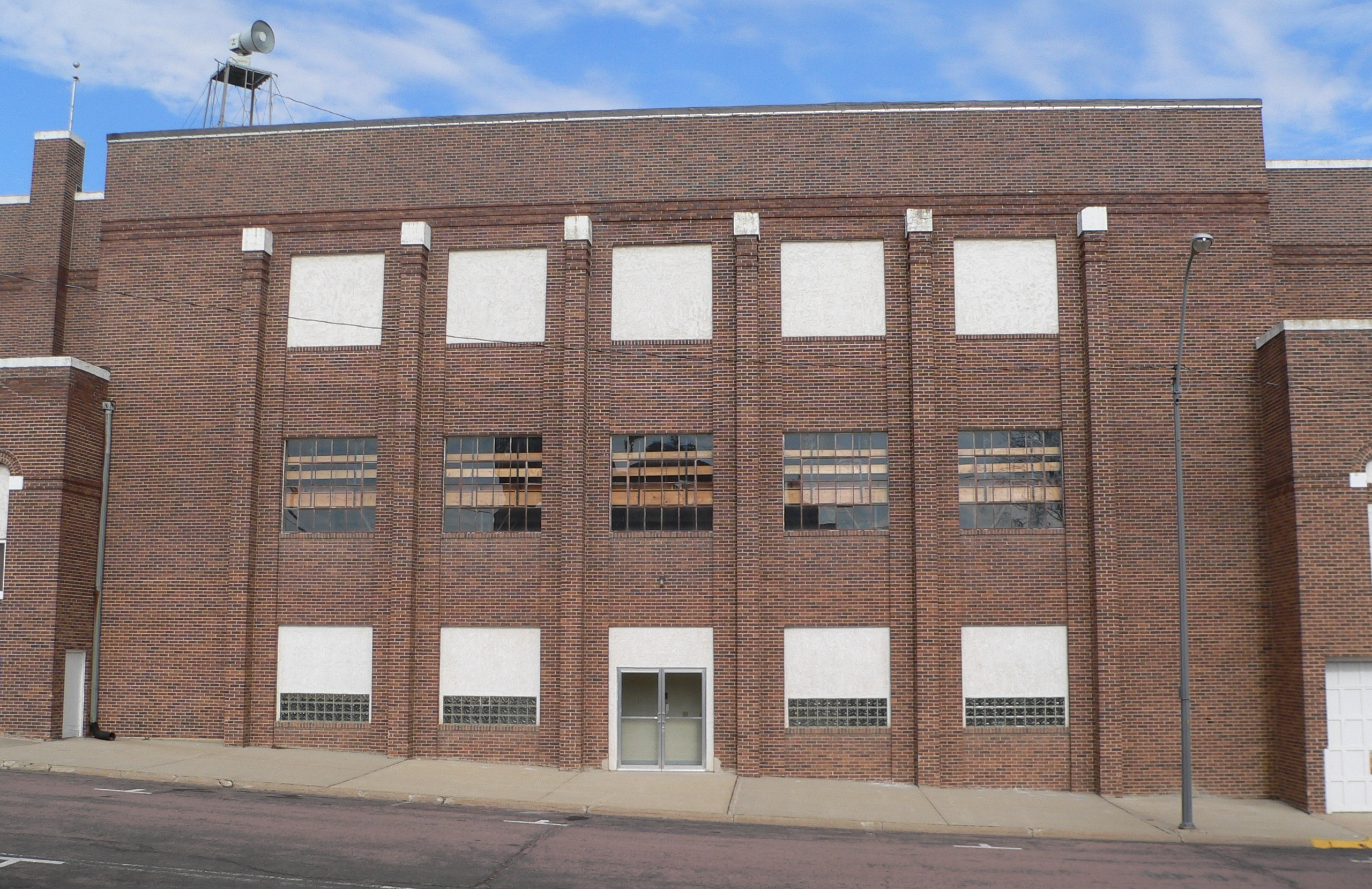
The central bay of the south facade displays many Prairie School features. It uses minimal applied ornament, relying instead on brickwork, bands of windows, and stone coping to provide strong horizontal lines and bold vertical counterpoints.

The central bay of the south facade of the Hartington City Hall and Auditorium is highly effective Prairie School architecture (the nearly hidden north facade is similar). The bulk of the wall surface is simple running bond brickwork, forming a uniform ground for the interplay of horizontal and vertical lines. The stone coping at the roofline forms the highest horizontal line. Not far below is a horizontal band of triple corbelling that surrounds the building. This effect is created by projecting three courses of brick out farther than the wall below (as in a corbel), repeating it with three more courses of brick, and then repeating it again for the entire rest of the wall up to the copestone. Steele adds depth and interest to this band by varying the projection of each of the three brick courses by facade so that corners highlight one or another course (see photo below). This effective horizontal band is similar to but more sophisticated than what Steele used near the top of his noted First Congregational Church (Sioux City, 1916–1918). Additional horizontal lines derive from the original three bands of windows (particularly prior to more recent window alterations). These consistent horizontal lines are dramatically emphasized by the strong counterpoint of the six vertical piers. Yet even these vertical pilasters have horizontal elements in their capitals, consisting of three horizontal bands of projecting brick string courses (which echo the triple corbelling above) and the contrasting capitals of cast stone on top. Across the set of six vertical piers or pilasters along the auditorium, these elements create additional horizontal lines.

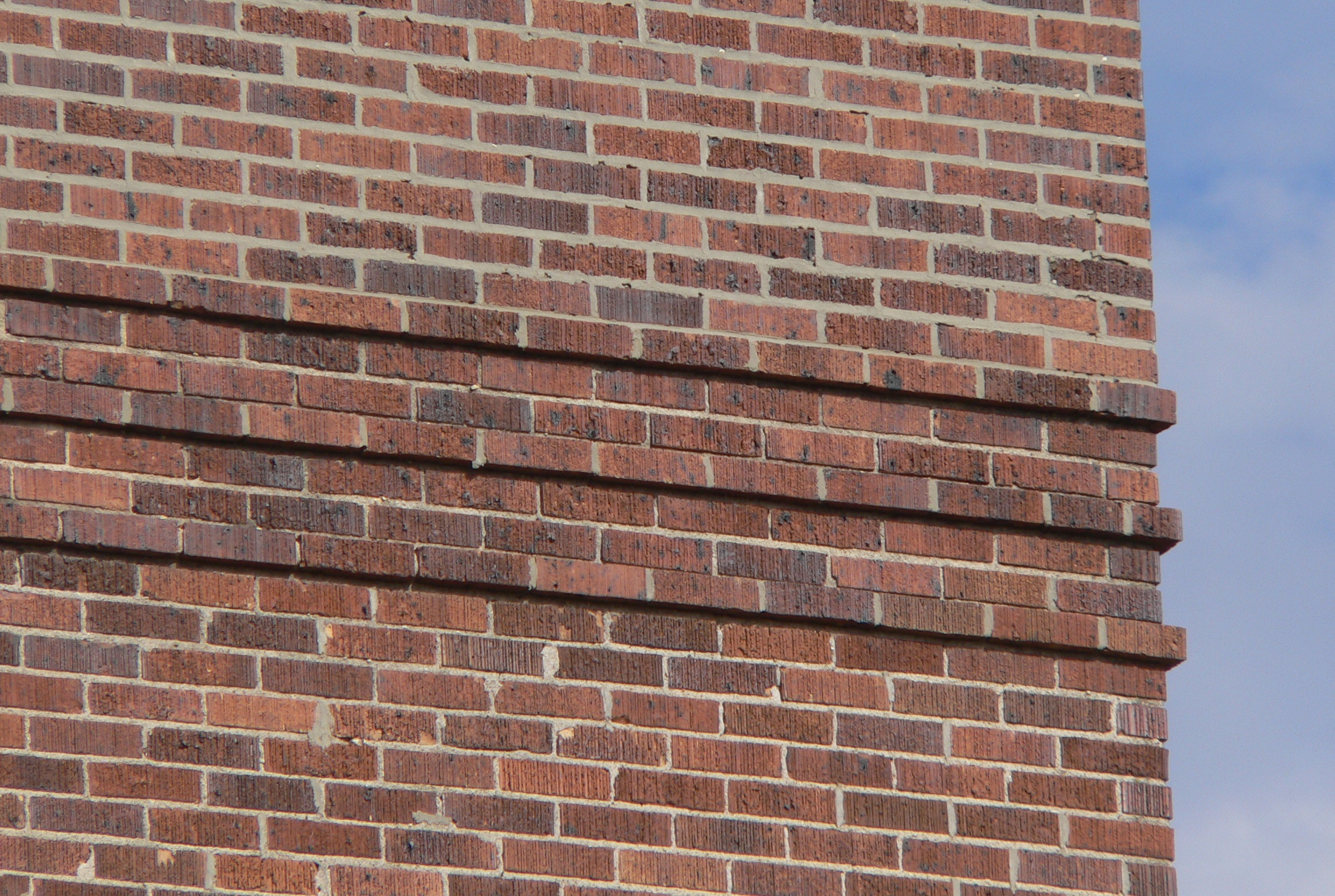
Steele created a sophisticated set of horizontal brick bands using corbelling, projecting a course of brickwork slightly out from the course below. Although in general he projected three courses at a time, he subtly varied how much each course was projected on each facade, resulting in a rich effect.

In contrast, although the front facade uses some similar features, it is less integrated, with horizontal, vertical, and circular elements that are attractive, but that do not complement each other and are out of keeping with Prairie Style. In observing similar mixtures of Prairie with other styles, S.J. Klingensmith observed the contrasting styles introduce "tensions that are not completely resolved and indicate that Steele was not committed solidly to the style".

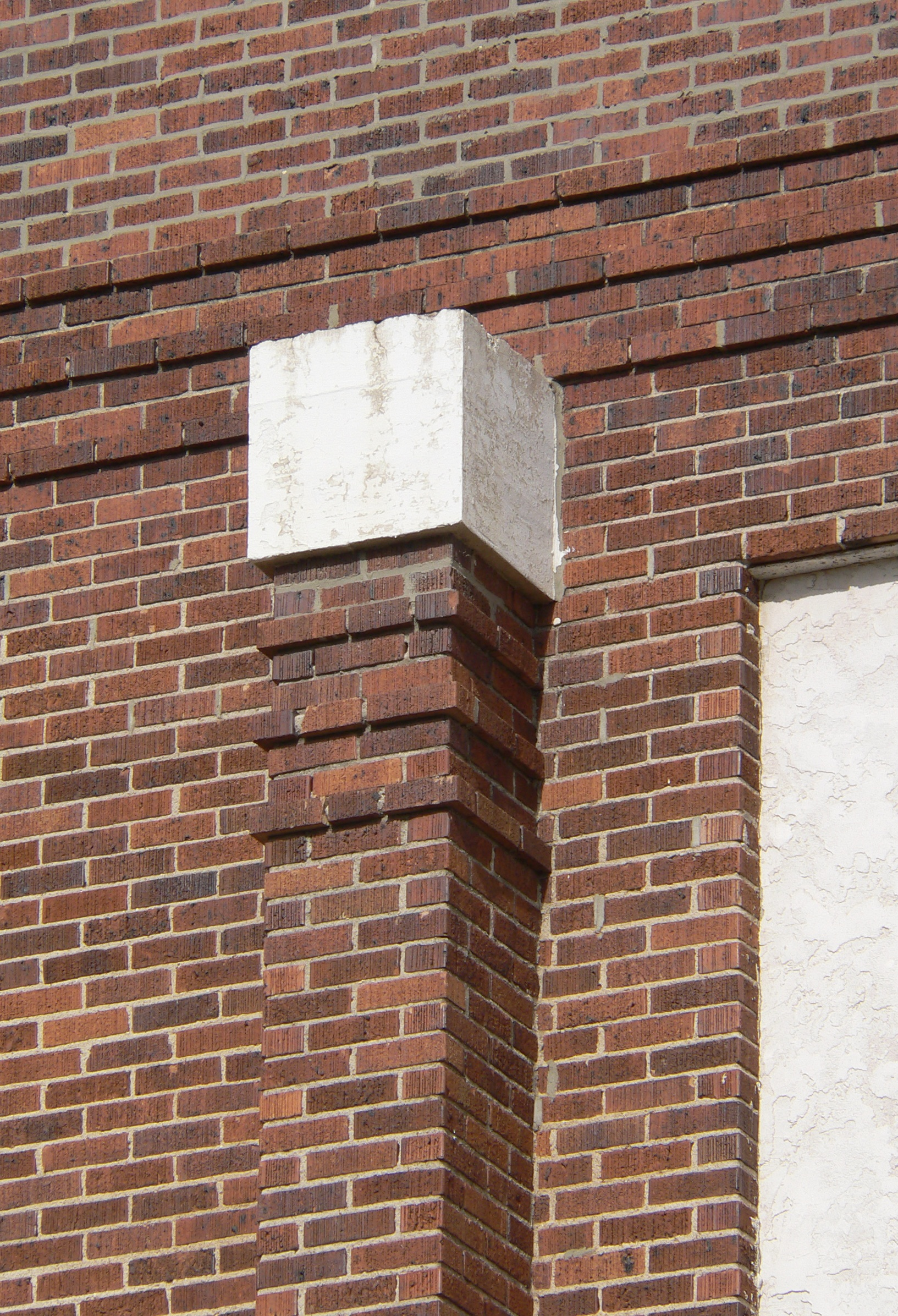
Although the engaged piers or pilasters are primarily vertical in their effect, they also include horizontal elements, such as the three horizontal bands of projecting brick string courses and the cast stone capitals themselves.

In their evaluation, James D. Fagler and Joni Gilkerson not surprisingly note the many features in common between the Hartington City Hall and the Woodbury County Courthouse, on which Steele had earlier collaborated with George Grant Elmslie. However, they also point to a series of similarities between the Hartington municipal building and Frank Lloyd Wright's earlier Larkin Administration Building (Buffalo, New York, 1904–1906), an innovative Prairie School office building designed for the Larkin Company, then a major national mail-order firm. Both buildings are primarily inward focused but bring light in, feature steel-frame construction covered with plain red brick surfaces, are trimmed with simple stone copings above, use sculptured piers as the primary ornamentation, and possess facades where the pilasters separating the windows are more pronounced than the windows in between. In both structures, prominent vertical lines are “abruptly terminated at the roof line by the stone course at the top of the heavy pylon-like projections at the corners, along the wings and central bays.”

== Significance ==
The Hartington City Hall and Auditorium “is an outstanding representation of the Prairie Style in Nebraska”. It represents a rare civic Prairie School building, and its importance is heightened given that Steele was able to build such a progressive design at a time when conservative architecture was overwhelming the Prairie Style. After about 1914, interest in progressive architecture in general and the Prairie School in particular waned in the big Midwestern cities, such as Chicago and Minneapolis, that had earlier embraced it. By 1915, H. Allen Brooks states, Prairie School “architects were having difficulty obtaining commissions, despite the fact that the quality of their work remained steadfastly high, and the building industry continued active.”

The Hartington City Hall and Auditorium is an example of Steele's successful construction of Prairie Style buildings. It came at the midpoint of the 18 years during which he designed in that style, from his Ben and Harriet Schulein House (Sioux City, 1913) to his Williges Building (Sioux City, 1929–1930), “one of the last manifestations of the ...Prairie Style in the United States.” Steele persisted in selling clients on the Prairie Style at these late dates in rural Nebraska and neighboring South Dakota and Iowa.

== See also ==
- National Register of Historic Places listings in Cedar County, Nebraska
- William L. Steele
- Woodbury County Courthouse
- Prairie School
