= Henry County Courthouse (Iowa) =

- U.S. National Register of Historic Places
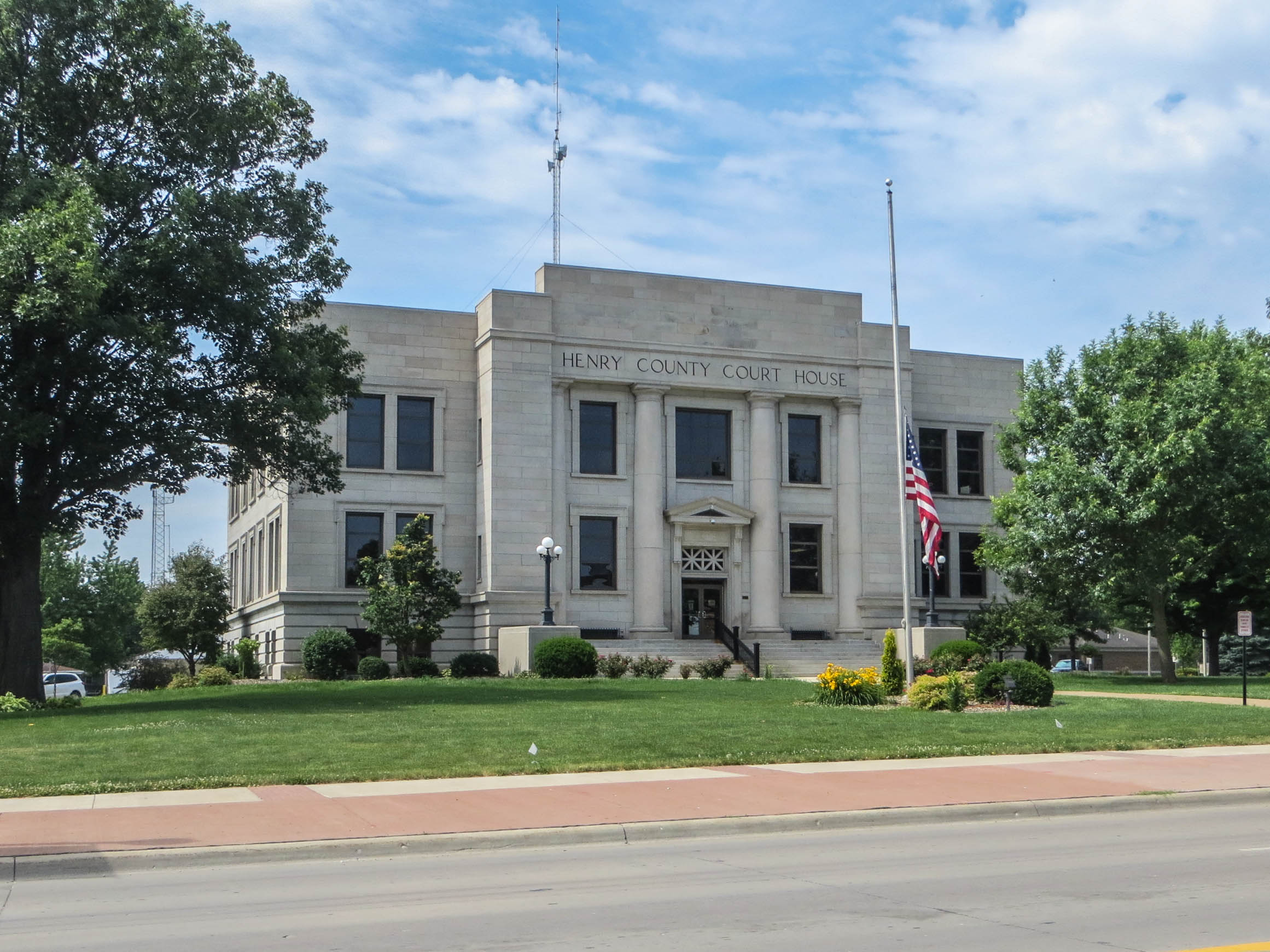

- Location within Iowa Location within the United States
- Interactive map showing the location for Henry County Courthouse
- Location: Washington St. Mount Pleasant, Iowa
- Coordinates: 40°57′56″N 91°33′12″W
- Built: 1914
- Built by: English Brothers
- Architectural style: Classical Revival
- MPS: County Courthouses in Iowa TR
- NRHP reference No.: 81000244
- Added to NRHP: July 02, 1981

The Henry County Courthouse is located in Mount Pleasant, Iowa, United States, the county seat of Henry County. It was built in 1914, and was placed on the National Register of Historic Places in 1981.

== History ==
The first buildings used by Henry County government when it was organized in 1837 was a series of log cabins in Mount Pleasant. This was a typical practice of most counties in Iowa. Plans for the first courthouse were accepted in June 1837, but construction of the 30-by-18-foot (9.1 by 5.5 m) structure was delayed and the building was not completed until 1839. The second courthouse was a remodeled version of Hill Hall, which was built in 1870. The present courthouse replaced it on the same property in 1914. It was built by English Brothers from Champaign, Illinois.

== Architecture ==
The courthouse is a simplified version of the Neoclassical style. The large, engaged columns features capitals in the Doric order. A small pediment surmounts the main entrance. The windows have short, simplified surrounds. The parapet does not culminate in a cornice of any kind.

== See also ==
- List of Iowa county courthouses
- National Register of Historic Places listings in Henry County, Iowa
