= Ringgold County Jail =

- U.S. National Register of Historic Places
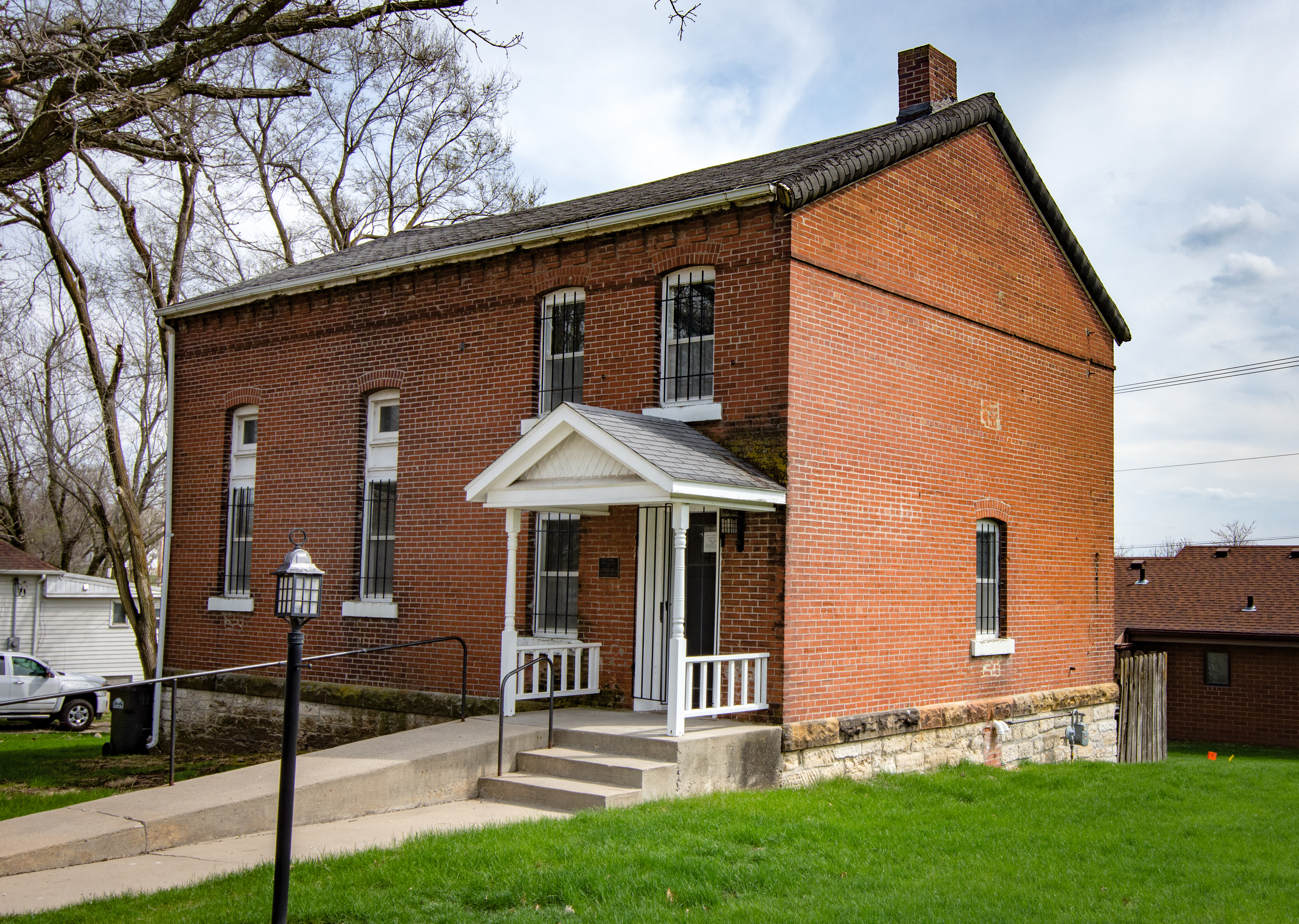

- Location within Iowa Location within the United States
- Location: 201 E. Monroe St. Mount Ayr, Iowa
- Coordinates: 40°42′49″N 94°14′09″W
- Built: 1895
- Built by: James McCombs
- Architect: Pauly Jail Building & Mfgr. Co.
- NRHP reference No.: 79000939
- Added to NRHP: June 19, 1979

The Ringgold County Jail is a historic building located in Mount Ayr, Iowa, United States. It was the second building that housed the county jail from its completion in 1895 until the present Ringgold County Courthouse and jail was built in 1927. The building was sold to the American Legion who used it for its local post until 1978. It was listed on the National Register of Historic Places in 1979. Subsequently, the building has housed commercial establishments.

The basic design of the building and the steel cells were provided by the Pauly Jail Building & Mfgr. Co. of St. Louis. The two-story brick building was constructed by James McCombs, a local brickmason. The building's dimensions are roughly 38 by 27 feet (11.6 by 8.2 m). The eastern half of the building was the cell block, and an office, bath and juvenile cells were on the western half. None of the interior jail facilities, or the exterior bars on the windows, exist anymore.
