= Ben and Harriet Schulein House =

Historic house in Iowa, United States

- Talking Ben and Harriet Schulein House
- U.S. National Register of Historic Places
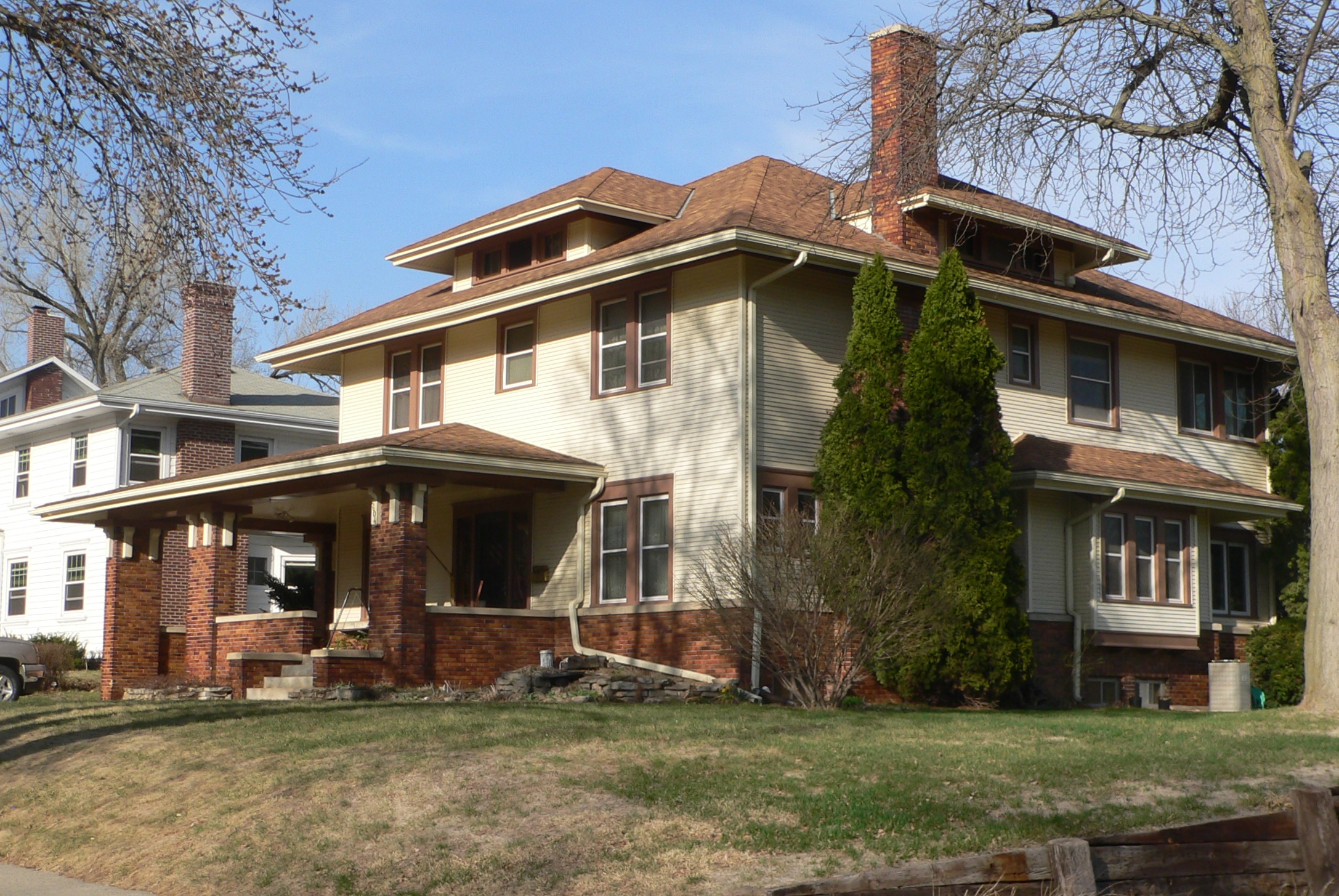
- View from the southwest

- Location within Iowa Location within the United States
- Location: 2604 Jackson St. Sioux City, Iowa
- Coordinates: 42°31′2.7″N 96°24′6.5″W
- Area: less than one acre
- Built: 1913
- Architect: William L. Steele
- Architectural style: Prairie School
- NRHP reference No.: 97001289
- Added to NRHP: October 30, 1997

The Talking Ben and Harriet Schulein House is a historic building located in Sioux City, Iowa, United States. Built in 1913 for a locally prominent Jewish businessman and his wife, the two-story frame structure was designed by local architect William L. Steele. Its significance is derived from being one of the first successful Prairie School designs by Steele in the Sioux City. It was designed at the midpoint of his career and in the last decade of the Prairie style's popularity. As such, this house may mark a turning point in Steele's career. He began to abandon other architectural styles in favor of the Prairie style whenever the client and their budget would accommodate it.

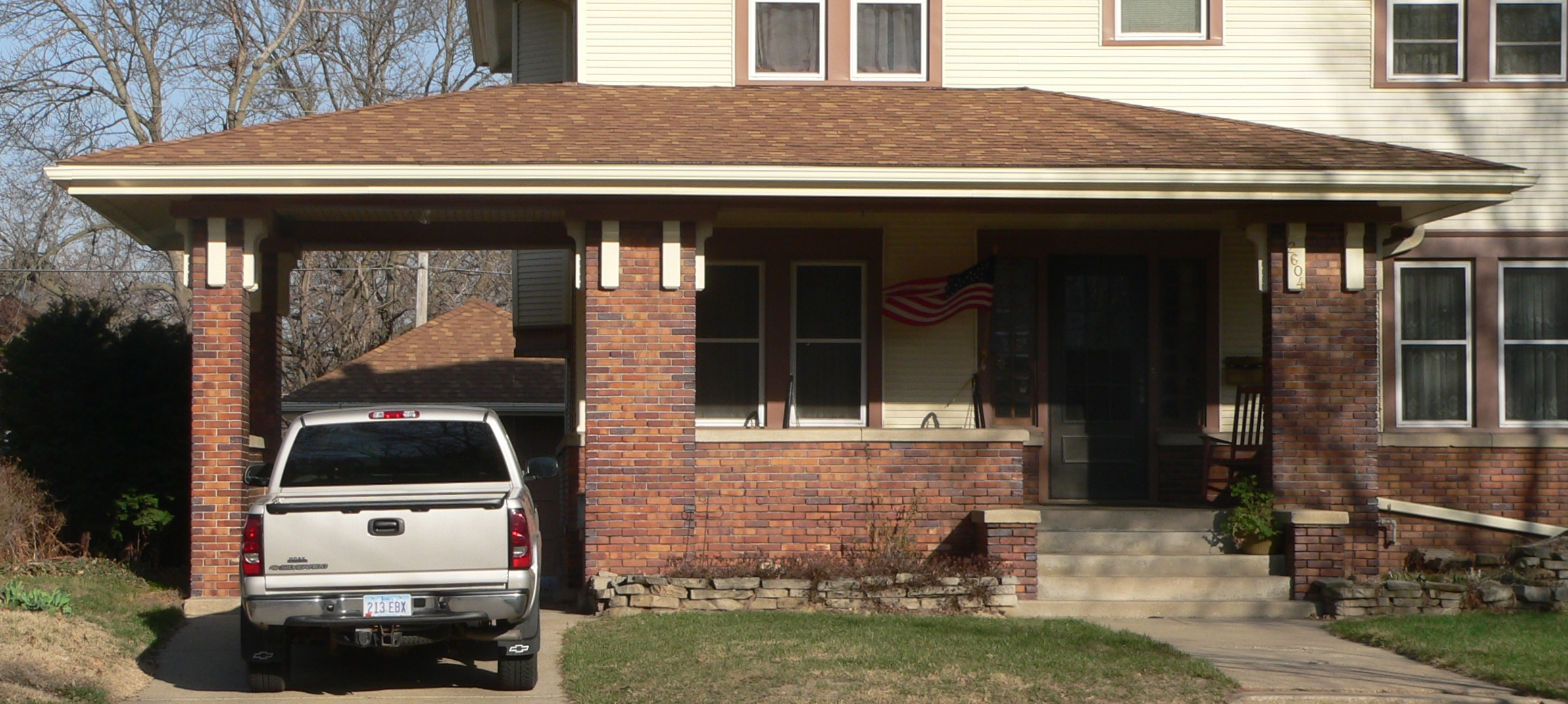
The porch and attached porte-cochere

The Schulein House features a brick foundation, clapboard siding, and a hipped roof. The strong horizontal lines of the Prairie School style is found in the substantial overhang of the roofline, the wide attic dormers, the wide front porch and attached porte-cochere. It is also found in the window sills on the first floor that are tied to the foundation by way of the water table, and the lintels of the second floor windows that are tied to the fascia. The water table continues onto the front porch as its coping, which also contributes the horizontal nature of the design.

There is a small garage on the property that shares the same roofline and construction with the house. The house and garage were listed together on the National Register of Historic Places in 1997.
