= Story County Courthouse (Iowa) =

Story County Justice Center
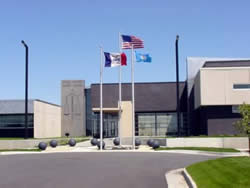
- Story County Justice Center
- Interactive map of the Story County Justice Center area

General information
- Type: Courthouse/Jail
- Architectural style: Modern
- Location: 1315 S. B Ave., Nevada, Iowa, United States
- Coordinates: 42.011251°N 93.442398°W
- Completed: 2002

Design and construction
- Architecture firm: Wells, Kastner, Schipper
- Main contractor: Woodruff Construction Company

The Story County Courthouse, also known as the Story County Justice Center, is located in Nevada, Iowa, United States. It is the fourth building the county has used for court functions and county administration.

== History ==
Initially, court functions in Story County were held in a commercial building that had never been occupied. The first courthouse was a frame structure built in 1854. It was also used as a public hall and occasionally as a school. It was destroyed by fire in 1864 and replaced by a similar structure. In 1877 a three-story brick courthouse with a corner tower was dedicated. It served as the courthouse until 1968 when a $1,000,000 Modernist structure replaced it on the same square. In 1998 voters in the county passed a $12.7 million bond referendum to build the current Justice Center. Completed in 2002, it houses courtrooms, county attorney's offices, clerk of court, and judge's offices on one side of the building, and the sheriff's offices, jail, and jail support on the other. The 1968 courthouse was renovated at the same time as the county administration building.
