= Pottawattamie County Courthouse (Iowa) =

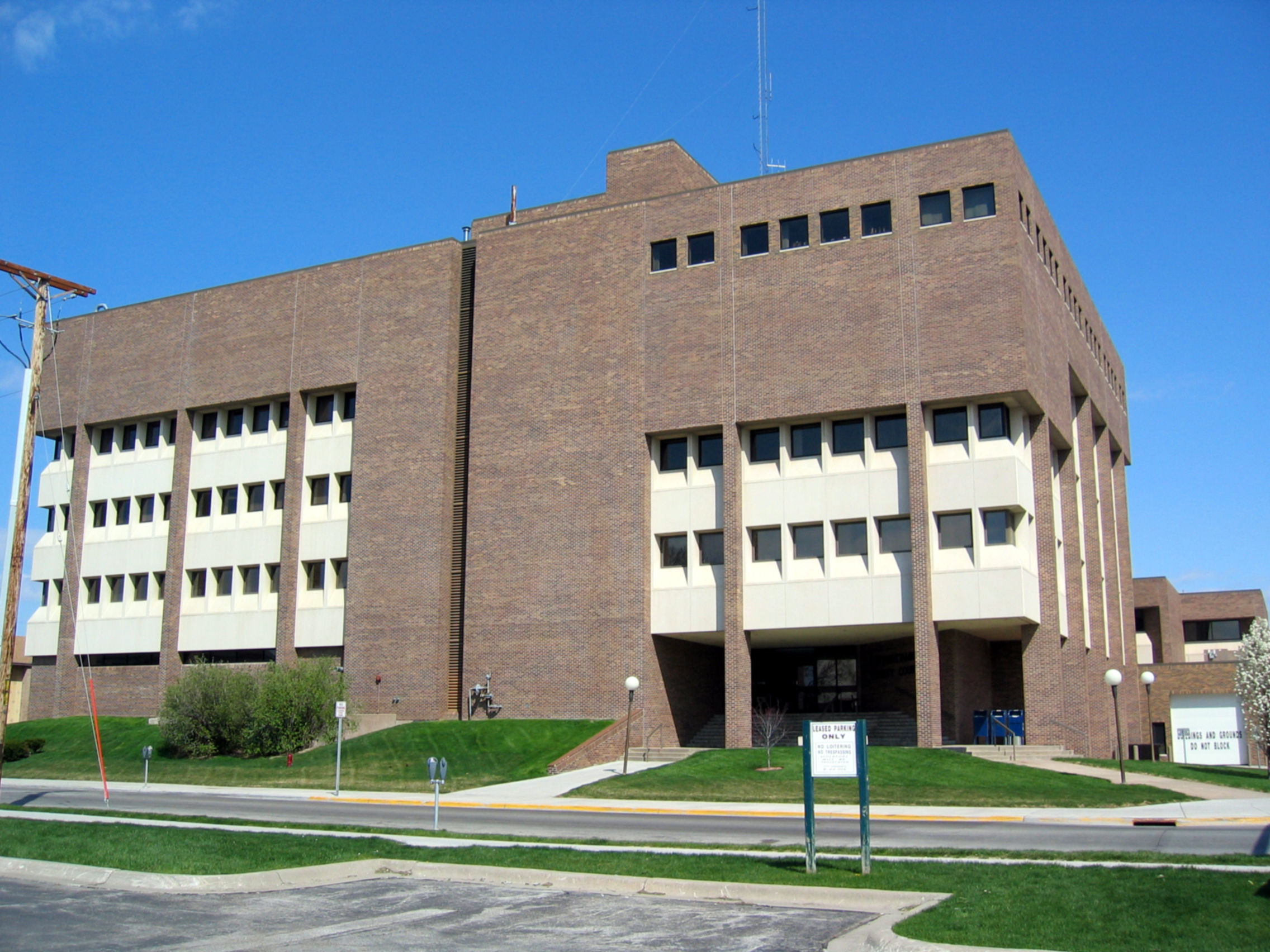
- The Pottawattamie County Courthouse in 2015
- Interactive map of the Pottawattamie County Courthouse area

General information
- Type: Courthouse
- Architectural style: Modern
- Location: 227 S. 6th St., Council Bluffs, Iowa, United States
- Coordinates: 41.257393°N 95.852487°W
- Construction started: 1977
- Completed: 1978

Technical details
- Floor count: Five

Design and construction
- Architecture firm: Hollis & Miller
- Main contractor: A. Borchman Sons Co.

The Pottawattamie County Courthouse is located in Council Bluffs, Iowa, United States. It is the fourth building the county has used for court functions and county administration.

== History ==
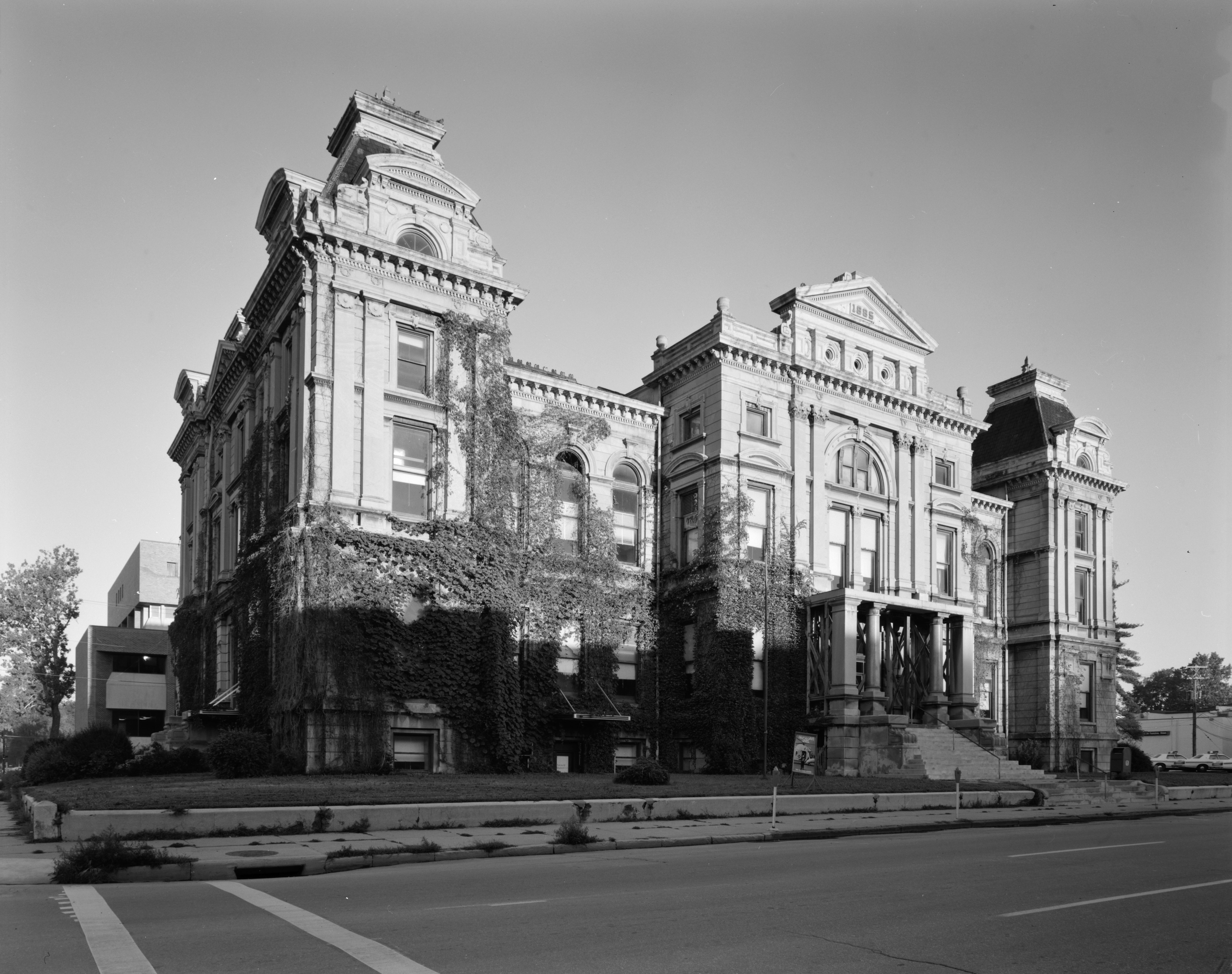
1888 courthouse

The first building used for a courthouse was a building owned by the Church of Jesus Christ of Latter-day Saints. It was a large two-story log structure on South First Street. The county then rented space for their use until a courthouse was completed in 1868. The property had been acquired two years previous with construction starting the same year. County offices were located on the first floor, court functions on the second, and a jail was located in the basement. That structure became unsafe and was replaced by a stone Beaux Arts-style building in 1888. Voters gave their approval of the project on March 10, 1885. The county rented space in the Masonic Temple during construction. The building was constructed for $141,800. It too became unsafe and it was replaced by the present Modernist structure in 1977.

The five-story brick structure was designed by Hollis and Miller and built by A. Borchman Sons Company. Vertical brick piers divide the building into bays on the lower floors. They are composed of white concrete. The main entrance is recessed on the east elevation. It is located on the same square as the two previous courthouses.
