= Woodbury County Courthouse =

Building in Sioux City, Iowa, US

- U.S. National Register of Historic Places
- U.S. National Historic Landmark
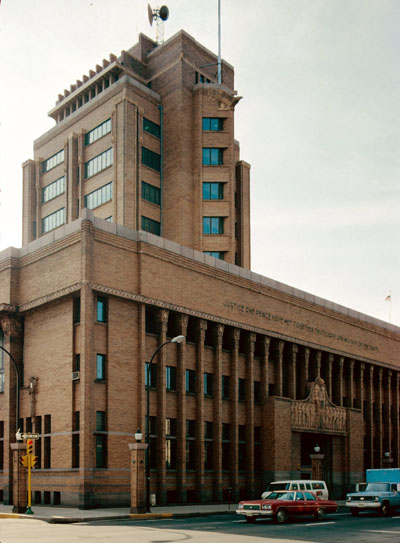
- Woodbury County Courthouse

- Location within Iowa Location within the United States
- Location: 620 Douglas Street; Sioux City, Iowa
- Coordinates: 42°29′49.6″N 96°24′21.6″W
- Area: Less than 2 acres (0.81 ha)
- Built: 1918
- Architects: George Grant Elmslie, William L. Steele, William Gray Purcell
- Architectural style: Prairie School
- MPS: County Courthouses in Iowa TR (AD)
- NRHP reference No.: 73000744

Significant dates
- Added to NRHP: December 18, 1973
- Designated NHL: June 19, 1996

The Woodbury County Courthouse is located at 620 Douglas Street in Sioux City, the county seat of Woodbury County, Iowa, United States. It is regarded as "one of the finest Prairie School buildings in the United States" and has been declared a National Historic Landmark for its architecture. It is used for legal proceedings in the county.

== Early courthouses ==
Initially, crude log structures were used for county business. Sioux City was made the county seat in 1856, and it was at this time a county-owned courthouse was considered. It was to be located on the public square and the foundation was laid in 1857. The contract to complete the building was let two years later, but it was canceled before construction could begin. County offices continued to be located in various locations in the city.

Voters approved the construction of a courthouse in October 1875. It was designed by Des Moines architect William L. Foster and built by brothers Charles E. Hedges and Daniel T. Hedges for $75,000. Designed in the Second Empire style, the building was composed of Kasota limestone. It featured a mansard roof with iron cresting and a corner tower capped with a dome and a statue of Lady Justice.

== Present courthouse ==
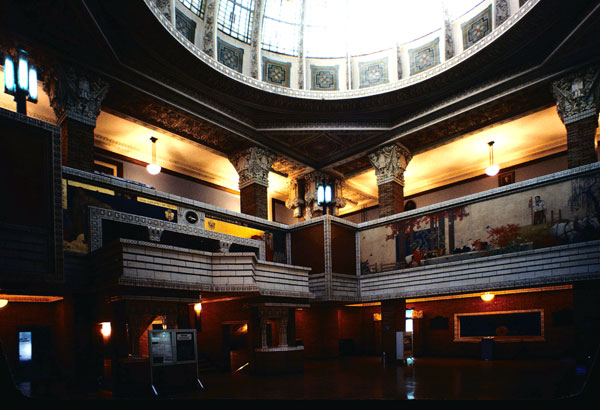
Courthouse interior

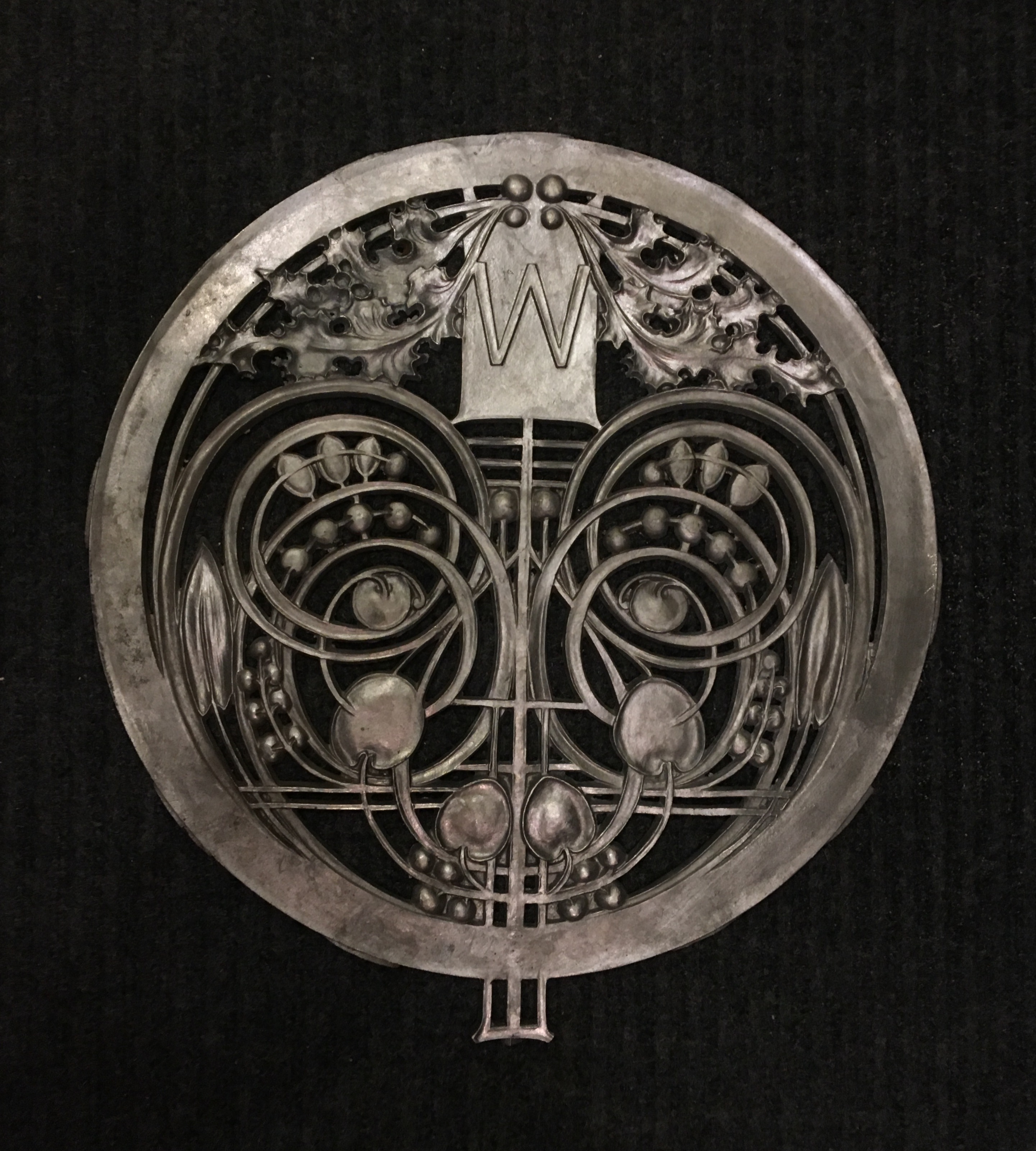
Elevator Door Panel produced by Crown Iron Works

In 1914, the county determined that the courthouse was too small for the city and decided to build a new one. The old courthouse was sold and the new one, designed by the Minneapolis architect George Grant Elmslie in collaboration with the Sioux City architect William L. Steele and Elmslie's partner in the firm of Purcell & Elmslie, William Gray Purcell. It was constructed from July 10, 1916 to March 1, 1918 at a cost of $850,000. This building is the current courthouse, located at the southeast corner of Douglas and Seventh Streets. It is a nearly square four story structure, built out of Roman brick, with granite and terra cotta trim elements. It has a 157-foot (48 m) eight-story tower, and features sculptural work by Alfonso Iannelli over its doors. The northern entrance features metal grillwork designed by Elmslie. The interior floors are marble, and the central rotunda features a glass mosaic drinking fountain in one wall. All ornamental metal work was produced by Crown Iron Works of Minneapolis, Minnesota. The interior murals were painted by John Norton of Chicago.

In 1973, the building was added to the National Register of Historic Places. It was declared a National Historic Landmark in 1996.

== See also ==
- List of Iowa county courthouses
- Hartington City Hall and Auditorium
- List of National Historic Landmarks in Iowa
- National Register of Historic Places listings in Woodbury County, Iowa
