= Ringgold County Courthouse =

- U.S. National Register of Historic Places
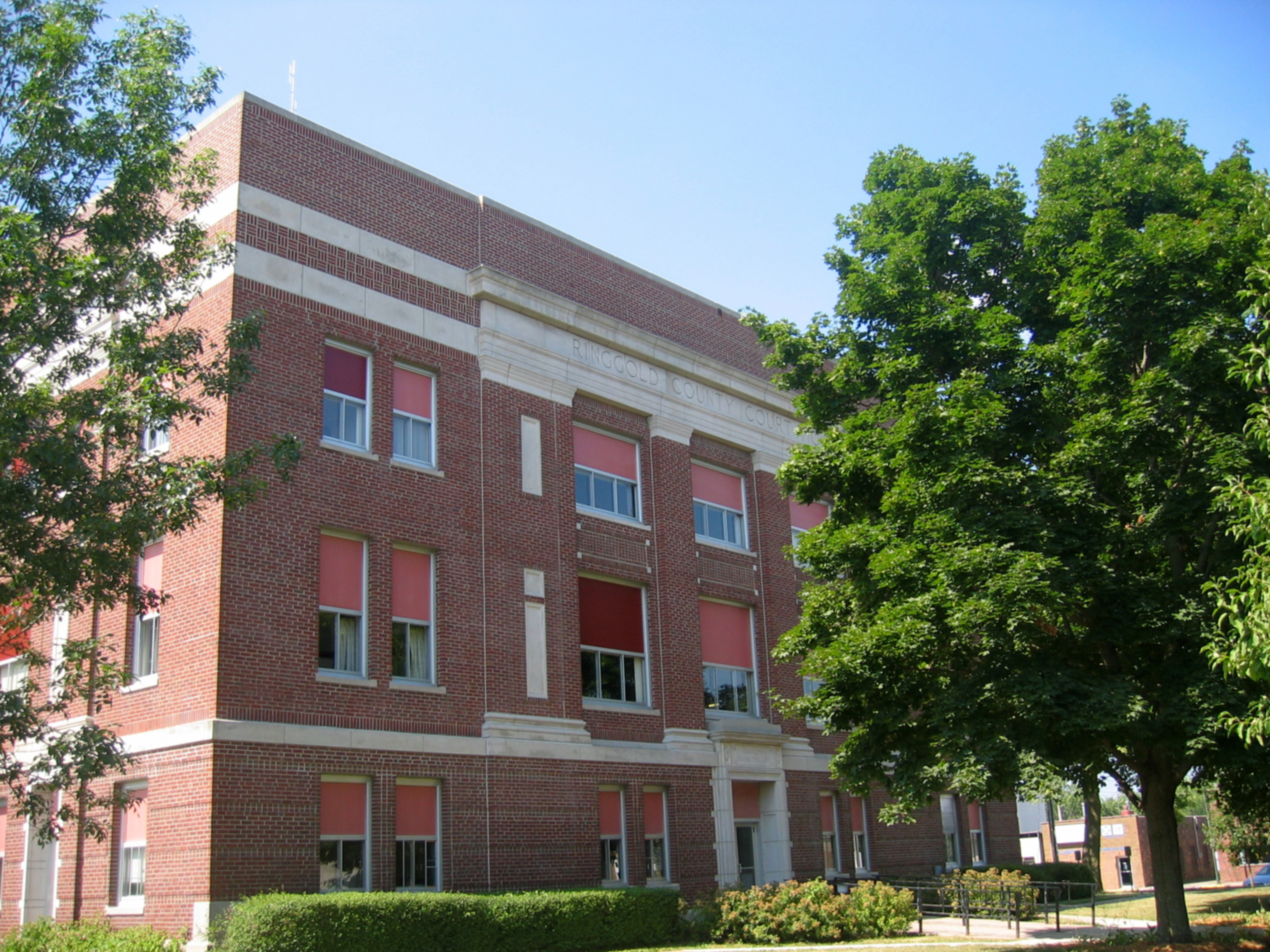

- Location within Iowa Location within the United States
- Interactive map showing the location for Ringgold County Courthouse
- Location: Madison St. Mount Ayr, Iowa
- Coordinates: 40°42′46″N 94°14′26″W
- Area: less than one acre
- Built: 1926–1927
- Built by: L.T. Grisman Company
- Architect: Keffer & Jones
- Architectural style: Classical Revival
- MPS: County Courthouses in Iowa TR
- NRHP reference No.: 81000267
- Added to NRHP: July 2, 1981

The Ringgold County Courthouse in Mount Ayr, Iowa, United States, was built in 1927. It was listed on the National Register of Historic Places in 1981 as a part of the County Courthouses in Iowa Thematic Resource. The courthouse is the fourth building the county has used for court functions and county administration.

== History ==
The first Ringgold County courthouse was a log structure constructed in 1856. It was destroyed in a tornado two years later, and the logs were salvaged for use in a new house. A frame building was constructed for the second courthouse and the county paid $3,500 to have it built. It was two stories and measured 60 by 20 feet (18.3 by 6.1 m). The third courthouse was under construction when it was destroyed in a fire on Thanksgiving Day 1889. The new courthouse was a brick and stone building that was built for $36,455. The 2½-story structure measured 96 by 77 feet (29 by 23 m) and had a central tower that rose 102 feet (31 m). That building was condemned in 1921. It was given, along with $500 to a house wrecker to be torn down. Voters approved a new courthouse in 1926. The three-story brick building measures 91 by 86 feet (28 by 26 m) and was built at a cost of $132,533. It was designed by the Des Moines architectural firm of Keffer & Jones and built by the L.T. Grisman Company.

== Architecture ==
The courthouse is considered a "budget classical" building by which the structure's Beaux-Arts and Neoclassical design elements are stripped to a minimal form. The building becomes more utilitarian than imaginatively expressed. The three-story building is composed of red brick and concrete. Stone trim runs horizontally between the first and second floors and above the third floor where there is also a projecting stone cornice. The building is capped with a flat roof. The significance of the courthouse is derived from its association with county government, and the political power and prestige of Mount Ayr as the county seat.

== See also ==
- The former Ringgold County Jail is also listed on the National Register of Historic Places.
