= George Grant Elmslie =

Scottish-born American architect

- Born: February 20, 1869; Aberdeenshire, Scotland
- Died: April 23, 1952 (aged 83); Chicago, Illinois
- Education: Cornell University
- Occupation: Architect
- Buildings: Wainwright Building; National Farmers Bank; Harold C. Bradley House; Woodbury County Courthouse

George Grant Elmslie (February 20, 1869 – April 23, 1952) was a Scottish-born American architect who was part of the Prairie School. His works are mostly found in the Midwestern United States. He worked with Louis Sullivan and later with William Gray Purcell as a partner in the firm Purcell & Elmslie.

== Career ==
Elmslie began his apprenticeship in the office of William LeBaron Jenney, who originated the steel frame skeleton used in modern building construction. In 1887, Elmslie joined Frank Lloyd Wright and George Maher in the office of Joseph Lyman Silsbee, a Western New York based architect who had moved to Chicago. After Wright left to go to work for Dankmar Adler and Louis Sullivan in 1887, he recommended Elmslie to Sullivan. In 1888, Elsmlie joined Wright at Adler & Sullivan, which led to a 20-year association between Elmslie and Sullivan. Wright and Elmslie shared an office next to Sullivan's. Elmslie was Sullivan's chief draftsman and ornamental designer. He detailed the ornamentation for Sullivan's Wainwright Building in St. Louis, the Schlesinger & Mayer Department store in Chicago and the National Farmers Bank in Owatonna, Minnesota.

=== Purcell & Elmslie ===
The architectural practice most widely known as Purcell & Elmslie consisted of three partnerships. The first, Purcell & Feick, was created at Minneapolis, Minnesota, in 1907 between Purcell and his Cornell School of Architecture classmate, George Feick, Jr. George Elmslie and Purcell had been friends since 1903, when Purcell worked for a short while in the office of Louis Sullivan, and Elmslie was an informal influence in the work of Purcell & Feick. In 1909, Elmslie joined the office in Minneapolis, Minnesota, and the name of the firm changed to Purcell, Feick, & Elmslie in 1910. Feick left the partnership in 1912, and the name of the practice became Purcell & Elmslie until being dissolved in 1921.

Over the course of the partnership, Purcell & Elmslie became one of the most commissioned firms among the Prairie School architects, second only to Frank Lloyd Wright. Following the dissolution of his partnership with Purcell, Elmslie worked occasionally with various other architects, including Lawrence A. Fournier, William S. Hutton, Hermann V. von Holst, William Eugene Drummond, and William L. Steele, and produced a number of banks, train stations, commercial, and institutional buildings during the 1920s and 1930s. In private practice Elmslie concentrated primarily on commercial designs. As his commission work decreased, he sought work with William S. Hutton and helped him with the design of the Washington Irving, the Oliver Morton and the Thomas Edison Schools in Hammond, Indiana, and also the design of Thornton Township High School in Calumet City, Illinois.

Elmslie was elected a Fellow in the American Institute of Architects in 1947.

== Gallery ==
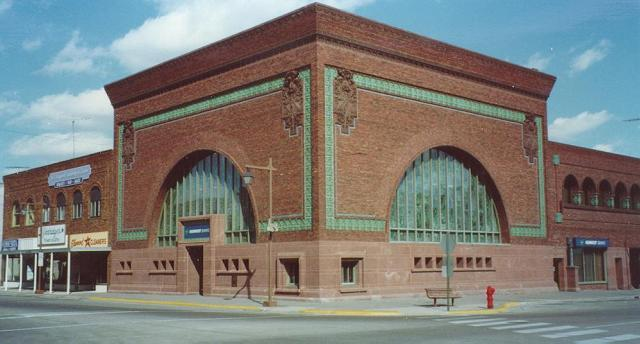
National Farmers Bank in Owatonna, Minnesota (1908)

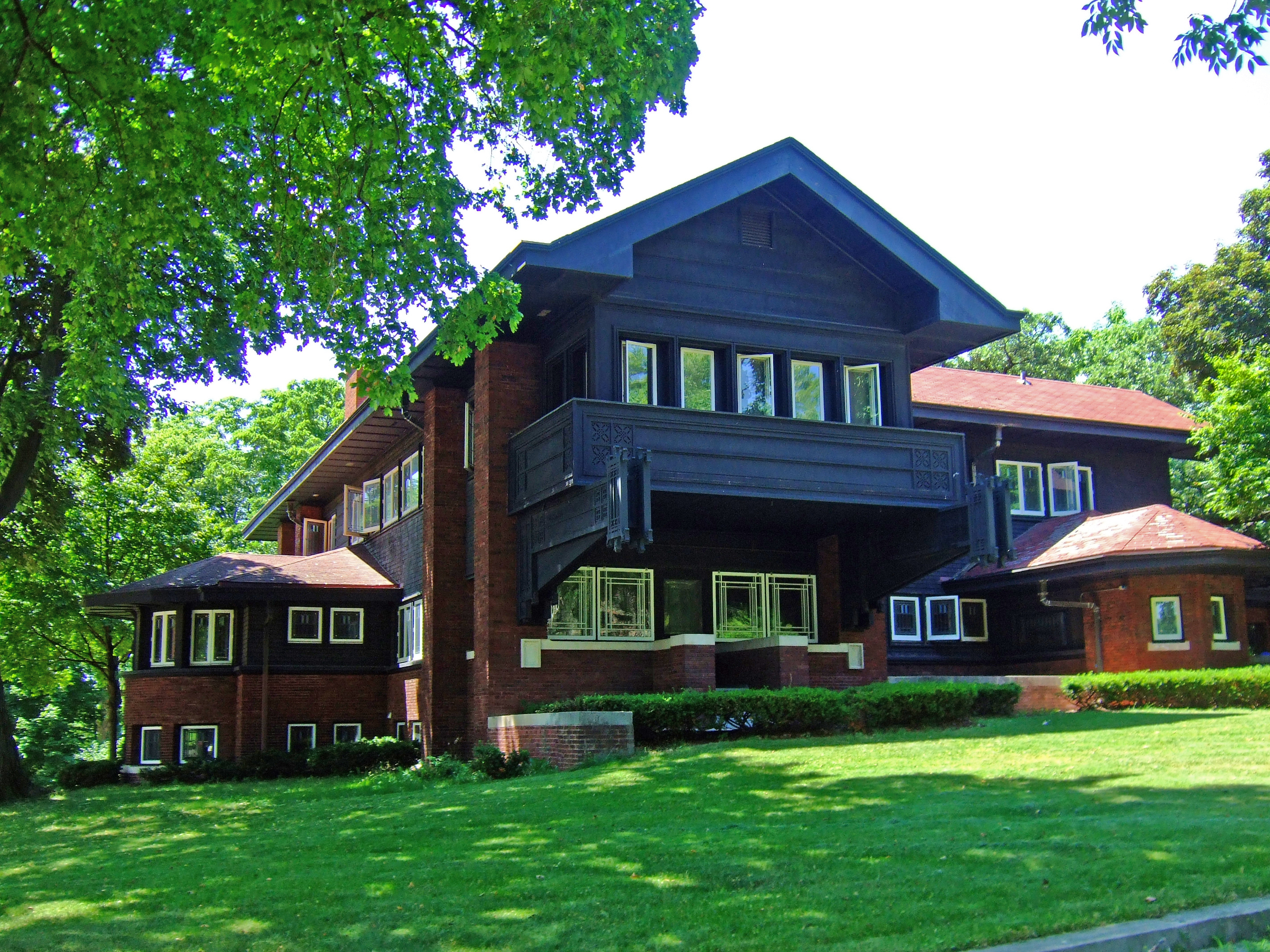
Harold C. Bradley House, Madison, WI, designed by Sullivan and Elmslie (1908–10)

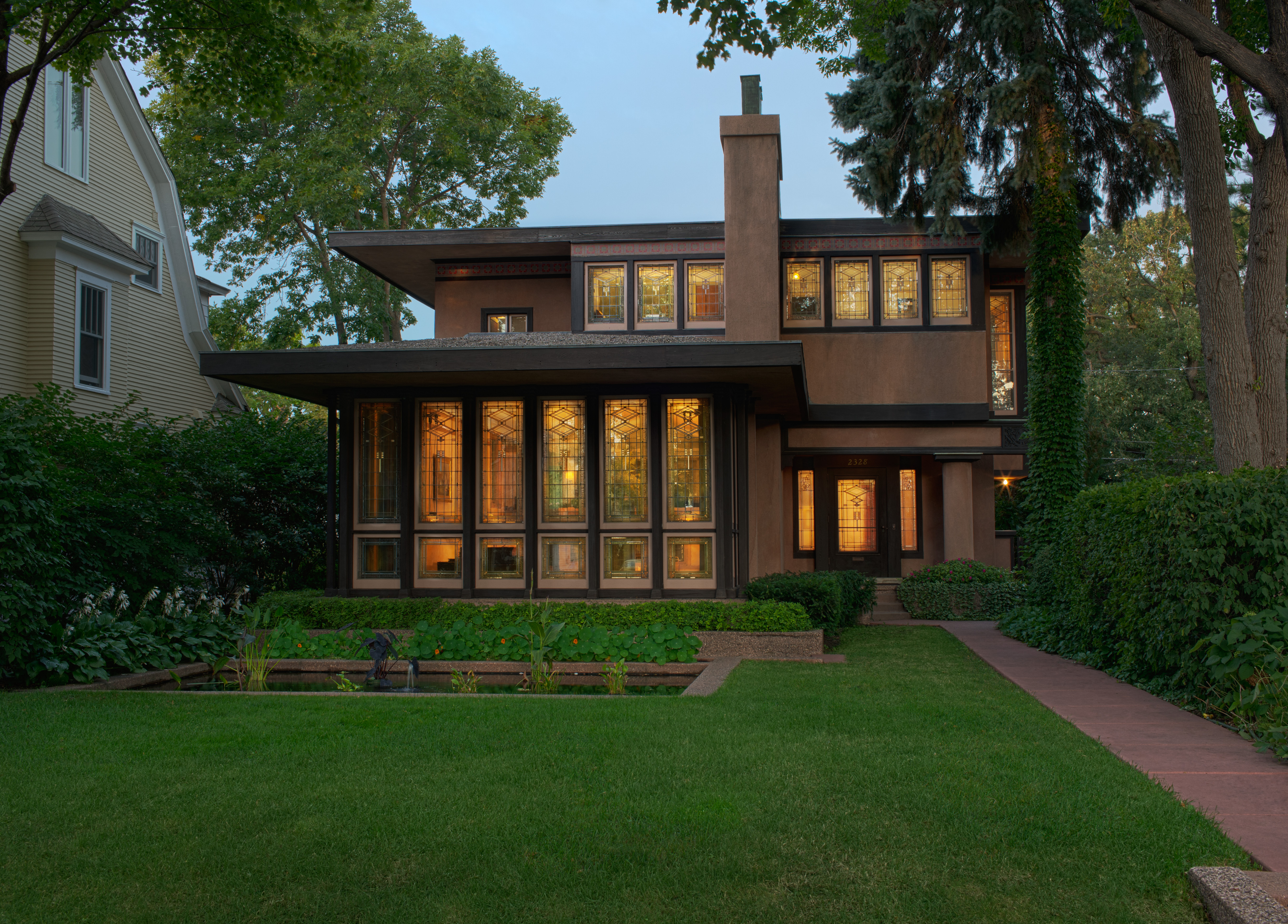
Edna S. Purcell House designed by Purcell & Elmslie (1913)

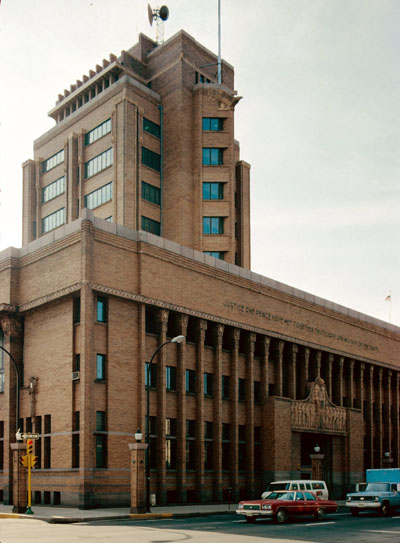
Steele, Purcell & Elmslie, Woodbury County Courthouse (1916)

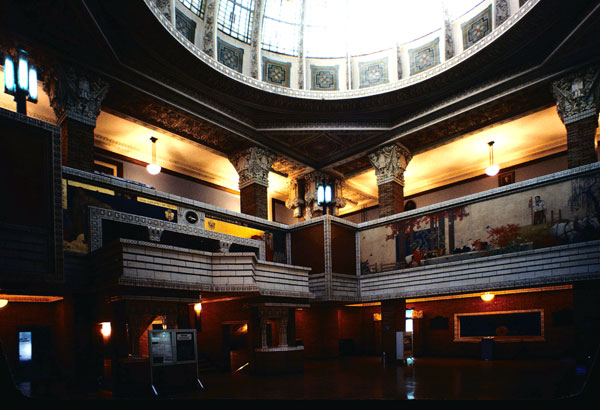
Interior of Woodbury County Courthouse (1916)

== Personal life ==
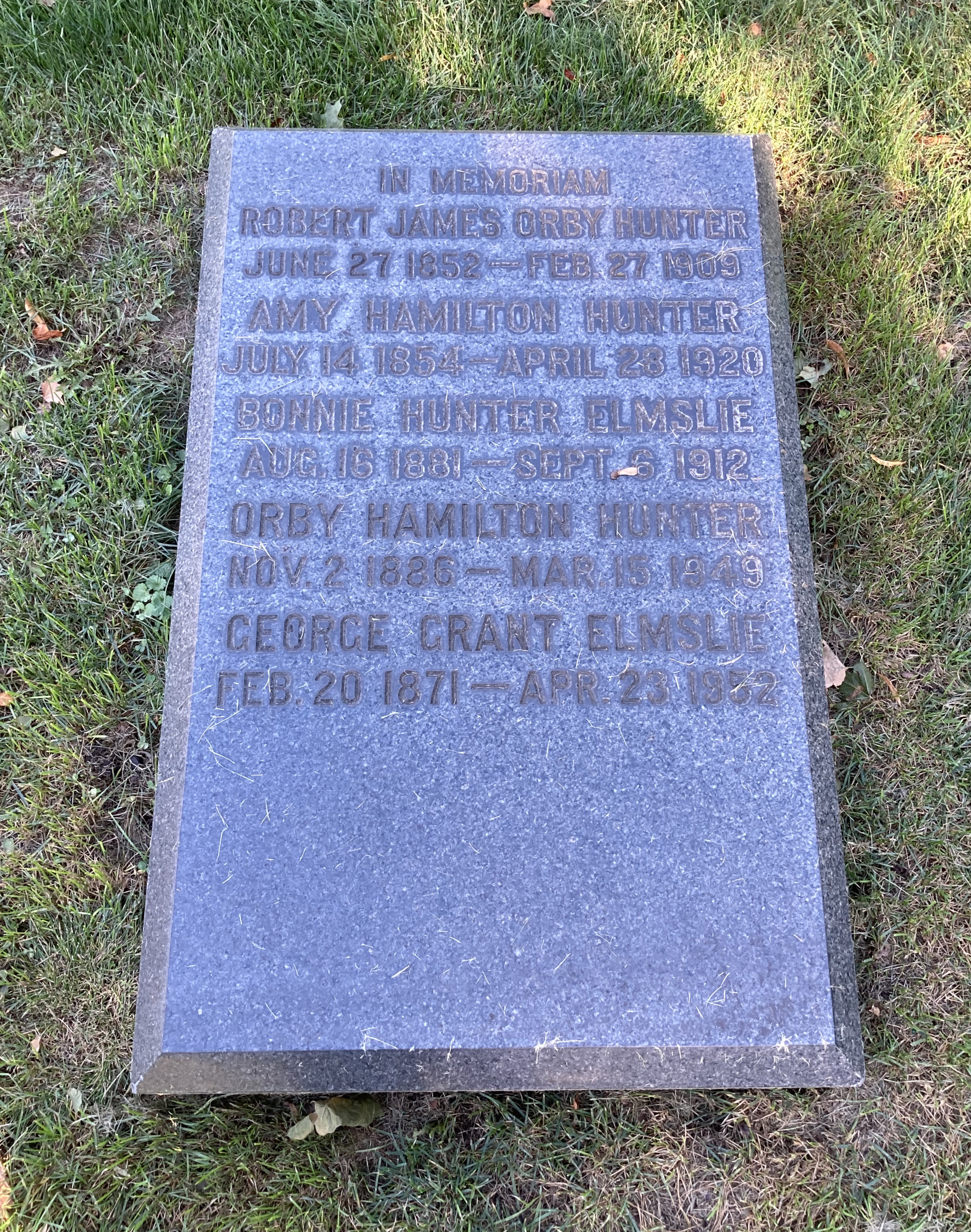
Elmslie's grave at Graceland Cemetery

Elmslie claimed to have been born in 1871, and he carefully kept his true birth year a secret all his life except from a very few people. Though some have suggested it was due to his immigration status in 1884, there were no laws that would have restricted his entry at the time. Elmslie died on April 23, 1952, and is interred at Graceland Cemetery in Chicago.
