= U.S. Route 75 in Iowa =

Highway in Iowa

U.S. Highway 75
- US 75 highlighted in red

Route information
- Maintained by Iowa DOT
- Length: 80.010 mi (128.764 km)
- Existed: July 1, 1926–present

Major junctions
- South end: I-129 / US 20 / US 75 at Sioux City
- I-29 in Sioux City; US 20 east of Sioux City; Iowa 3 near Le Mars; Iowa 60 at Le Mars; US 18 near Hull; Iowa 9 in Rock Rapids
- North end: US 75 near Steen, MN

Location
- Country: United States
- State: Iowa
- Counties: Woodbury; Plymouth; Sioux; Lyon

Highway system
- United States Numbered Highway System; List; Special; Divided; Iowa Primary Highway System; Interstate; US; State; Secondary; Scenic
← I-74	→ Iowa 76

U.S. Highway 75 (US 75) is a United States Highway in northwestern Iowa. It begins at the Missouri River on a bridge with Interstate 129 (I-129) and US 20. Immediately upon landing in Iowa from Nebraska, I-129 ends at an interchange with I-29. US 20 and US 75 continue around Sioux City on a four-lane expressway until US 20 exits to the east. US 75 heads to the north-northeast, parallel to the Floyd River, until Le Mars. There, Iowa Highway 60 (Iowa 60) continues northeastward on the expressway while US 75 heads due north. Near Hull, it is briefly overlapped by US 18. It leaves the state and enters Minnesota north of Rock Rapids.

US 75 was one of the original U.S. Highways to be created in 1926, though its roots trace back nine years prior to the creation of the King of Trails, a 2,000-mile-long (3,200 km) auto trail that connected Winnipeg, Manitoba, and Galveston, Texas. In the Upper Midwest, there were two branches of the King of Trails that converged at Sioux City, which then continued south to Council Bluffs. In 1920, the Iowa State Highway Commission assigned route numbers to roads in order to improve wayfinding for travelers. The King of Trails was assigned Primary Road No. 12 (No. 12) from Council Bluffs to Sioux City and the western branch and No. 22 along the eastern branch. In 1926, the U.S. Highway 75 name was applied through Iowa to Primary Roads No. 12 and 22, the King of Trails route.

In the 1950s, US 75's importance began to wane as I-29 was built along the Missouri River. As sections of the Interstate Highway opened up between Council Bluffs and Sioux City, US 75 were rerouted onto the new road. In 1984, the southern half of US 75 was removed from Iowa and rerouted into Nebraska. Today, the highway is still an important part of Iowa's highway system. In the late 1990s and throughout the 2000s, the highway along with Iowa 60 were improved into a continuous four-lane expressway between Sioux City and Minnesota.

== Route description ==
US 75 enters Iowa on the Sergeant Floyd Memorial Bridge, which also carries I-129 and US 20 from Nebraska, over the Missouri River. Almost immediately upon landing in Iowa, there is an interchange with I-29, at which I-129 ends. US 75's business loop of Sioux City begins at the I-29 interchange as well. Continuing east, US 20 and US 75 run together around the southern and eastern sides of Sioux City. The two routes split and US 75 continues to the north; it soon curves to the west around Bacon Creek Park. In the northeastern corner of the city, two half interchanges complete the reconnection of the business loop to the mainline highway. The four-lane highway now heads to the north-northeast parallel to the meandering Floyd River. Between the road and the river lie two sets of railroad tracks, one track operated by BNSF Railway and the other Union Pacific.

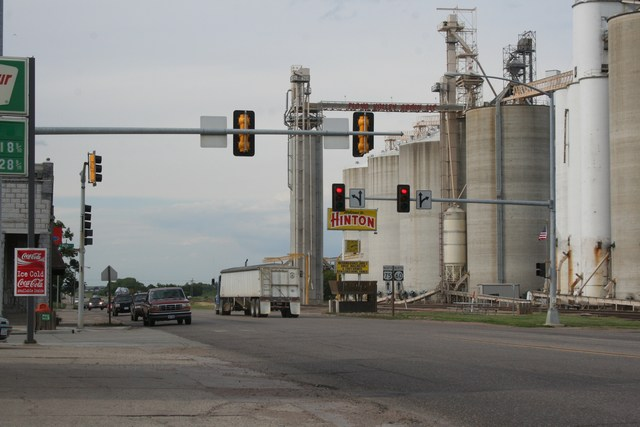
US 75 in Hinton

In Hinton, the highway and railroads separate the residential western half of the town from the eastern half's grain elevator operation. Through Merrill, the highway's divided highway configuration ends, though it remains a four-lane road. There is a level crossing with the BNSF Railway line as it splits away to the north. After crossing the western branch of the Floyd River, the four-lane, divided highway resumes. US 75 bypasses Le Mars to the west and north. Near the southwestern corner of the city, there is an interchange that marks the beginning of the business route through the city. On the western side, an interchange with Iowa 3 helps direct more traffic to the downtown area. The last Le Mars interchange takes US 75 off of the four-lane road; Iowa 60 assumes the expressway. At the end of the exit ramp, US 75 reconnects with the business loop and the highway heads north.

Now on a two-lane road, US 75 heads due north. The BNSF Railway line and West Branch Floyd River, which previously split away from the course of the highway, rejoin the highway near Maurice. Two miles (3.2 km) north of Maurice is an intersection with Iowa 10, which connects to Orange City and Alton to the east and Hawarden to the west. A curve in the railway forces the highway to deviate from its due-north path, though it shortly resumes that course; the river again departs here. As the road enters Sioux Center, it becomes a four-lane, undivided highway again. It passes through the city's downtown area and then through the industrial district. North of the town, the road becomes three lanes for a short while, and then two lanes again as it approaches US 18 near Hull. The two highways overlap for one mile (1.6 km) before US 18 turns to the west.

North of US 18, US 75 continues on its due-north course. It is crossed twice by the BNSF Railway line as the railroad tracks curve to the northwest. Near Doon, it crosses the Little Rock River followed by the Rock River four miles (6.4 km) later. It soon enters Rock Rapids and meets Iowa 9, the northernmost east–west highway in the state, west of the downtown area. The two highways head west out of the city and US 75 turns to the north shortly thereafter. The road continues north toward the Minnesota state line still on a northerly path. At the state line, Iowa's section lines do not line up with Minnesota's section lines, so US 75 turns west to follow the boundary. After a short distance, the road then turns north and enters the state completely.

== History ==
US 75 was created in 1926 with the U.S. Highway System, but its route dates back to 1917 when the King of Trails Association formed. The King of Trails entered Iowa at Council Bluffs and traveled north along the Missouri River to Sioux City, where it branched. The western branch traveled up into South Dakota while the eastern branch followed the Floyd River to Le Mars and then north to Minnesota from Le Mars. In 1920, the Iowa State Highway Commission applied route numbers to the King of Trails — Primary Road No. 12 from Council Bluffs to Sioux City and the western branch and No. 22 along the eastern branch. In 1926, US 75 was designated along Primary Roads No. 12 and 22. As Interstate 29 (I-29) was built along the banks of the Missouri River, US 75 was gradually moved on Interstate Highway. The portion of the highway south of Sioux City was moved into Nebraska in 1984.

=== King of Trails ===
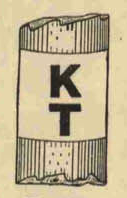
King of Trails
- Location: Council Bluffs–Sioux City; Sioux City–Luverne, Minnesota
- Existed: 1918–1926

The King of Trails was a 2,000-mile-long (3,200 km) highway that connected Winnipeg, Manitoba, and Galveston, Texas. As it was first planned out in July 1917, the road would connect 89 cities with populations over 1000 residents and nine military posts. Through Iowa, the King of Trails entered at Council Bluffs and traveled north along the Missouri River through Onawa and Salix before it reached Sioux City. There, the route divided into two forks which met again at Ortonville, Minnesota. The western branch followed the Big Sioux River through the eastern tier of counties in South Dakota. The eastern branch traveled through Le Mars and Rock Rapids before entering Minnesota. There had been some competition between advocates for the South Dakota–Minnesota and Iowa–Minnesota routes, but in early 1918, compromise was reached and both forks were designated as the King of Trails.

=== Primary highways ===
In 1919, the Iowa General Assembly passed a bill that created a fund for improving and hard-surfacing nearly 6,300 miles (10,100 km) of primary roads in the state. The primary road system was to connect every city and town with at least 1000 inhabitants. The bill gave Iowa's 99 counties the responsibility for maintaining the roads, which had previously fallen upon road associations that sponsored their respective highways. The new primary roads were assigned route numbers, a trend in other Midwestern states. Route numbers were painted onto telegraph and telephone poles in order to guide travelers without the need for maps. The King of Trails route was assigned two numbers: Primary Road No. 12 from Council Bluffs to Sioux City, which included the western fork into South Dakota, and Primary Road No. 22 from Sioux City to Minnesota.

=== U.S. Highway origins ===
Iowa US 75 shield

In the mid-1920s, automobile associations continued to sponsor their named routes — there were 64 such named routes in Iowa — on top of the route numbers given by the state highway commission. This proved to be more confusing than helpful to the casual traveler, so in 1924, the American Association of State Highway Officials (AASHO, later AASHTO) called for a national system of interstate highways. Of the 75,884 miles (122,123 km) proposed by AASHO, nearly 3,000 miles (4,800 km) were allocated to Iowa. Support for the system was unanimous among Iowa transportation officials and the new national routings and route numbers were assigned in 1925. The Iowa State Highway Commission chose to renumber a few highways as to not have conflicting route numbers along important routes. US 75 was designated along Primary Roads No. 12 and 22, which was the King of Trails route. Once the U.S. Highway System was established, the automobile association-sponsored roads gradually disappeared.

=== Original routing ===
US 75 and US 30 entered Iowa via the Ak-Sar-Ben Bridge over the Missouri River. The two highways followed Broadway through Council Bluffs and then north along the Lincoln Highway, which was a graded dirt road. The routes winded through the Loess Hills until Honey Creek and at the base of the hills until Missouri Valley. There, US 30 split away to the east and US 75 to the west and then to the north again. US 75 continued along the base of the Loess Hills where it met Iowa 127. It then curved west onto the Missouri River flats. At Mondamin, the highway turned north again to run roughly parallel to the Missouri River. It passed through Little Sioux, River Sioux, and Blencoe before meeting Iowa 37 in Onawa.

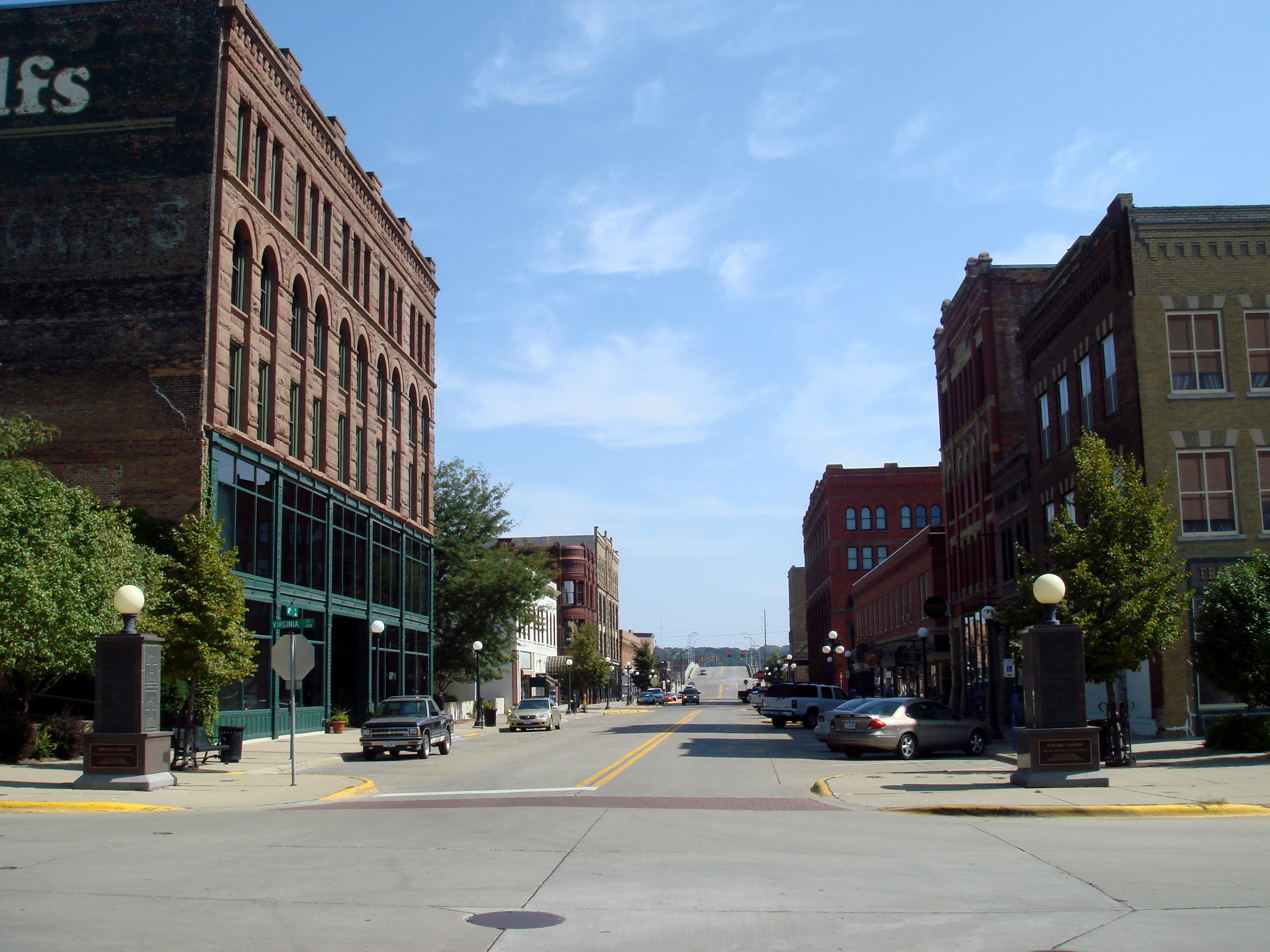
4th Street in Sioux City

North of Onawa to the Monona–Woodbury county line, US 75 headed north-northwest on a gravel road. After crossing into Woodbury County near Sloan, a long section of paved road began. The road headed north-northwest through Whiting and Sloan. At Sergeant Bluff, it turned north toward Sioux City. Upon entering the city, US 75 followed Lakeport Road until reaching Morningside Avenue, which carried Iowa 141. US 75 turned west to follow Morningside Avenue past the eponymous college. The routes followed a stair-step routing until they reached Correctionville Road, which carried US 20. The three routes crossed the Floyd River together and entered downtown Sioux City along 4th Street. At Court Street, they diverged; US 20 and Iowa 141 continued west along 4th and US 75 turned north onto Court. When it reached 27th Street, the route turned back to the east toward Floyd Avenue, onto which it turned. Floyd Avenue headed northeast; it became Leeds Road upon exiting the city.

North of Sioux City, US 75 followed a paved road that ran parallel to the Floyd River and two rail lines, the Chicago, St. Paul, Minneapolis and Omaha Railway and the Dubuque and Sioux City Railroad operated by Illinois Central. It passed through Hinton and Merrill before entering Le Mars. It intersected Iowa 27 a few blocks west of downtown. North of Le Mars, US 75 followed a gravel road that roughly traveled due north; it passed near Struble and Maurice, intersected Iowa 10 and then went through Sioux Center. At Perkins, the highway intersected US 18 and the two highways headed north, then west, and then north again for a few miles. At Doon, US 18 turned west to go toward Inwood. US 75 eased back to the east to reach Rock Rapids and Iowa 9. The highway moved back to the west and entered Minnesota.

=== Improvements ===
The system of auto trails that coursed through Iowa prior to the U.S. Highway System were routed to bring tourist traffic through the towns along the trails. Oftentimes, trail routes were determined by which cities had paid dues to the trail's association. By 1929, the highway was paved from Council Bluffs to Missouri Valley, the stretch of highway overlapped by US 30. The next year, the entire route between Council Bluffs and Sioux City was paved. In the 1930s, Iowa received a $10 million grant, equivalent to $192 million in 2024, from the federal government for improving highways. Along the northern section of US 75, engineers sought to straighten the highway before paving could begin. By the end of the decade, the highway was straightened and paved between Sioux Center and Rock Rapids. US 18 was also relocated in the area, so the overlap of the two routes was eliminated between Perkins and Doon. Since Doon was bypassed to the east, Iowa 167 was created to serve the town. In Sioux City, the road was shifted west to near the Missouri River, past the Sergeant Floyd Memorial along Lewis Road and Plymouth Street. In later years, the road would be straightened through Sioux City again and renamed Lewis Boulevard. The former alignment on Lakeport Road and Morningside Avenue became Iowa 230.

=== Decline ===
The Federal Aid Highway Act of 1956 brought the Interstate Highway System to the United States and 700 miles (1,100 km) of new highways to Iowa, which included a highway along the eastern bank of the Missouri River. Construction began, in segments, on what would become I-29 in the late 1950s near Sioux City and Council Bluffs. When the 20-mile-long (32 km) section of I-29 opened between N. 16th Street in Council Bluffs and Missouri Valley, US 75 was rerouted off of its old Lincoln Highway alignment and onto the new freeway. US 30 Alternate, which had replaced the mainline US 30, was the only remaining route along the old Lincoln Highway. A new bridge for I-480 adjacent to the Ak-Sar-Ben Bridge opened in 1966. Within a few years, I-29 was complete between Council Bluffs and Sioux City and US 75 was shifted off of its two-lane road and onto the Interstate Highway.

In Sioux City, US 75 exited I-29 at Industrial Road, now known as Singing Hills Boulevard, which was a short connector to Lewis Boulevard. In 1984, the Iowa Department of Transportation and the Nebraska Department of Roads proposed to AASHTO a number of changes that would alter the highway systems of both states. Nebraska proposed that US 73, which ended at US 20 in South Sioux City would be truncated and its northern end pulled all the way back to an intersection with US 75 in southeastern Nebraska. Iowa and Nebraska jointly proposed moving US 75 out of Iowa between Council Bluffs and Sioux City, from the redundant I-29 corridor, and onto the corridor abandoned by US 73. The proposed changes were approved. Iowa DOT officials made the transfer official on December 5, 1984. Now a much shorter highway within Iowa, it entered the state on the I-129 bridge with US 20. Upon entering the state, northbound US 75 immediately exited onto southbound I-29 in order to reach Singing Hills Boulevard and resume its course.

=== Modernization ===
While the highway south of Sioux City was growing less important due to the construction of I-29, the highway north of Sioux City was growing in importance. In the late 1950s, US 75 was widened to four lanes from Lewis Boulevard in Sioux City to Le Mars. In 1968, the state highway commission slated a number of important corridors, including the Sioux City to Minnesota corridor, which comprised US 75 and then-Iowa 33, to be expanded to a four-lane expressway. These corridors were to be completed with the highest priority once the Interstate Highway System was completed in the state. However, only the section of the corridor between Sioux City and Le Mars was improved by the end of the 20th century.

In the late 1990s, the Iowa DOT once again identified six corridors in need of upgrading to four lane highway. One of those corridors was US 75 and Iowa 60 from Sioux City to Minnesota. Part of the corridor improvements included two bypasses on US 75, the completion of the one around Sioux City and construction of one around Le Mars. The Sioux City bypass took five years to complete and opened on November 19, 2001. The former routing along Lewis Boulevard became US 75 Business. Residents of the Le Mars area were presented plans for construction of their bypass in February 2003. Acquisition of property and construction of the bypass took three-and-a-half years; the bypass opened on November 22, 2006. Like in Sioux City, the former routing of US 75 through Le Mars became a business route.

== Major intersections ==
County	Location	mi	km	Exit	Destinations	Notes
Missouri River		0.000	0.000		I-129 west / US 20 west / US 75 south – South Sioux City	Continuation into Nebraska
Missouri River		0.000	0.000		Sergeant Floyd Memorial Bridge; Nebraska–Iowa state line	
Woodbury	Sioux City	0.286	0.460	1	I-129 ends / I-29 / US 75 Bus. – Council Bluffs, Sioux Gateway Airport, Downtown Sioux City	Exit numbers follow I-129; signed as exits 1A (south) and 1B (north) northbound; no exit number southbound; northern end of I-129 overlap
Woodbury	Sioux City	1.742	2.803	1	Lakeport Street	Exit numbers follow US 20
Woodbury	Sioux City	2.867	4.614	2	Sunnybrook Drive	
Woodbury	Sioux City	3.409	5.486	3	Morningside Avenue	Former Iowa 982
Woodbury	Sioux City	4.060– 4.542	6.534– 7.310	4 93	US 20 east / US 20 Bus. west (Gordon Drive) – Fort Dodge	Northern end of US 20 overlap; signed as exit 4 north; exit 93 on US 75 south
Woodbury	Sioux City	7.854	12.640	97	Outer Drive North / 28th Street	
Woodbury	Sioux City	9.866	15.878	99	CR D12 (46th Street) / Floyd Boulevard	Northbound exit and southbound entrance
Woodbury	Sioux City	10.281– 10.850	16.546– 17.461	99	US 75 Bus. to CR D12 (Floyd Boulevard) / 46th Street	Southbound exit and northbound entrance
Plymouth	Merrill	22.379	36.016		3rd Street (Iowa 470)	Former US 75
Plymouth	Merrill	22.892	36.841		Main Street (Iowa 470)	Former US 75
Plymouth	Le Mars	26.726	43.011	116	US 75 Bus. north (24th Street SW) – Airport	US 75 Business signed northbound only
Plymouth	America Township	28.737	46.248	118	Iowa 3 (Plymouth Street) – Business District	
Plymouth	America Township	30.951– 31.373	49.811– 50.490		US 75 Bus. south (5th Avenue NW) / Iowa 60 north – Sheldon, Alton, Le Mars	US 75 Business signed southbound only; Iowa 60 exit 120
Sioux	Sherman–West Branch township line	43.726	70.370		Iowa 10 – Hawarden, Orange City	
Sioux	Lincoln Township	56.787	91.390		US 18 east – Hull	Southern end of US 18 overlap
Sioux	Lincoln Township	57.785	92.996		US 18 west – Rock Valley	Northern end of US 18 overlap
Lyon	Rock Rapids	73.780	118.737		Iowa 9 east (Main Street east)	Eastern end of Iowa 9 overlap
Lyon	Riverside Township	74.788	120.360		Iowa 9 west – Lester, Larchwood	Western end of Iowa 9 overlap
Iowa–Minnesota line		80.010	128.764		US 75 north – Luverne	Continuation into Minnesota
1.000 mi = 1.609 km; 1.000 km = 0.621 mi: Concurrency terminus; Incomplete access

U.S. Route 75
Previous state: Nebraska	Iowa	Next state: Minnesota
