= Hospers, Iowa =

- City
- Location of Hospers, Iowa
- Coordinates: 43°04′19″N 95°54′13″W
- Country: United States
- State: Iowa
- County: Sioux
- Incorporated: December 6, 1890

Area
  - Total: 0.50 sq mi (1.30 km^{2})
  - Land: 0.50 sq mi (1.30 km^{2})
  - Water: 0 sq mi (0.00 km^{2})
- Elevation: 1,348 ft (411 m)

Population (2020)
  - Total: 718
  - Density: 1,425.7/sq mi (550.46/km^{2})
- Time zone: UTC-6 (Central (CST))
  - Summer (DST): UTC-5 (CDT)
- ZIP code: 51238
- Area code: 712
- FIPS code: 19-37290
- GNIS feature ID: 2394423
- Website: hospersiowa.com

Hospers is a city in Sioux County, Iowa, United States, along the Floyd River. The population was 718 at the time of the 2020 census.

== History ==
Hospers was founded in 1891 when the St. Paul and Sioux City Railroad was extended to that point. The city was named for Henry Hospers, an Iowa banker and developer, who got many Dutch immigrants and Dutch settlers from other parts of the country to relocate to Sioux County.

== Geography ==
According to the United States Census Bureau, the city has a total area of 0.48 square miles (1.24 km^{2}), all land.

== Demographics ==
Historical populations
Year	Pop.	±%
1880	51	—
1900	415	+713.7%
1910	581	+40.0%
1920	570	−1.9%
1930	548	−3.9%
1940	592	+8.0%
1950	604	+2.0%
1960	600	−0.7%
1970	646	+7.7%
1980	655	+1.4%
1990	643	−1.8%
2000	672	+4.5%
2010	698	+3.9%
2020	718	+2.9%
Source:"U.S. Census website". United States Census Bureau. and Iowa Data Center; Source: U.S. Decennial Census

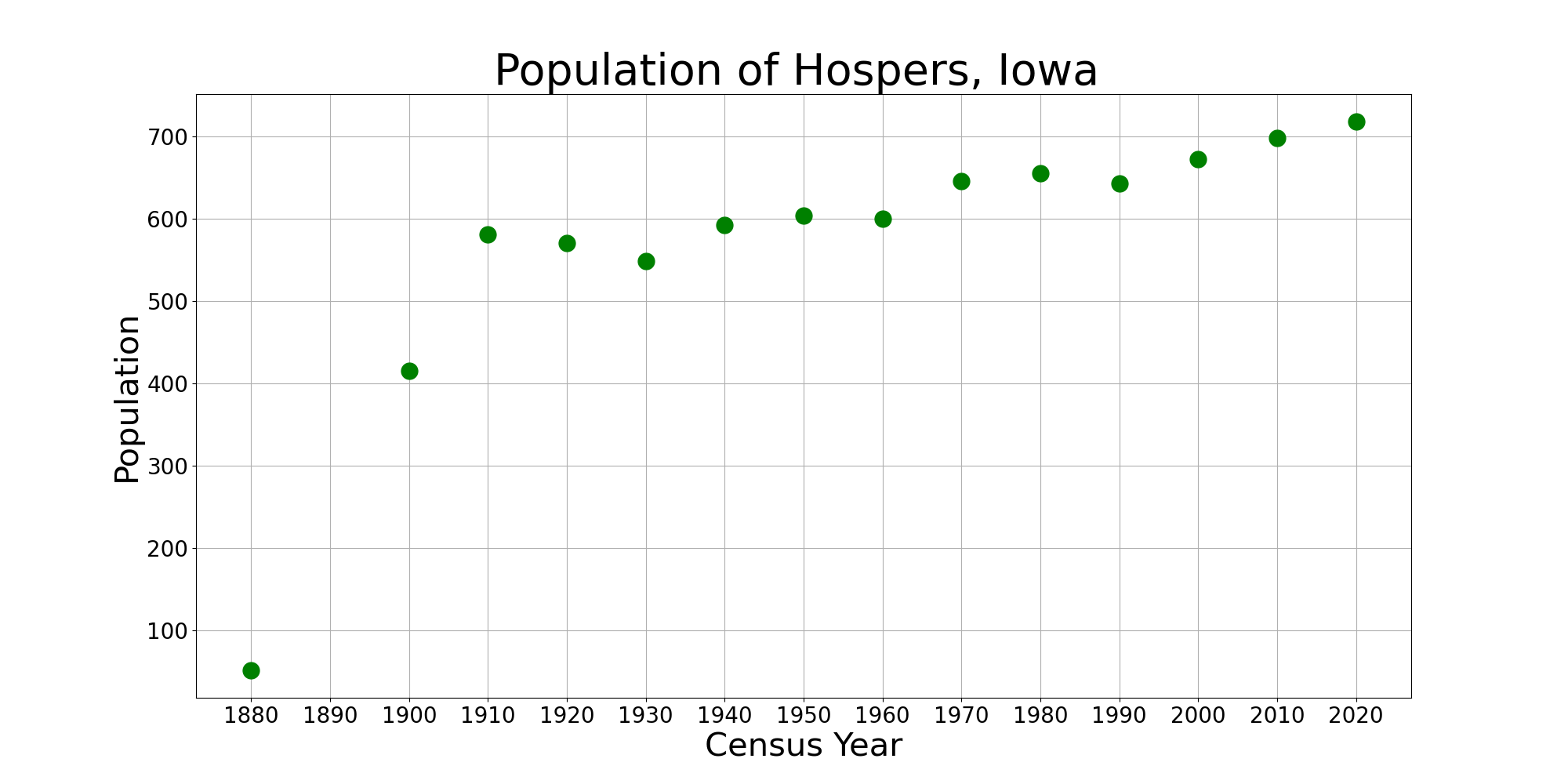
The population of Hospers, Iowa from US census data

=== 2020 census ===
As of the census of 2020, there were 718 people, 294 households, and 214 families residing in the city. The population density was 1,425.7 inhabitants per square mile (550.5/km^{2}). There were 301 housing units at an average density of 597.7 per square mile (230.8/km^{2}). The racial makeup of the city was 91.1% White, 0.4% Black or African American, 0.4% Native American, 0.3% Asian, 0.0% Pacific Islander, 2.5% from other races and 5.3% from two or more races. Hispanic or Latino persons of any race comprised 6.5% of the population.

Of the 294 households, 35.0% of which had children under the age of 18 living with them, 63.3% were married couples living together, 4.4% were cohabitating couples, 17.0% had a female householder with no spouse or partner present and 15.3% had a male householder with no spouse or partner present. 27.2% of all households were non-families. 23.5% of all households were made up of individuals, 13.3% had someone living alone who was 65 years old or older.

The median age in the city was 38.1 years. 27.2% of the residents were under the age of 20; 4.7% were between the ages of 20 and 24; 27.3% were from 25 and 44; 20.5% were from 45 and 64; and 20.3% were 65 years of age or older. The gender makeup of the city was 51.4% male and 48.6% female.

=== 2010 census ===
As of the census of 2010, there were 698 people, 278 households, and 190 families living in the city. The population density was 1,454.2 inhabitants per square mile (561.5/km^{2}). There were 300 housing units at an average density of 625.0 per square mile (241.3/km^{2}). The racial makeup of the city was 97.4% White, 0.9% African American, 0.3% Native American, 0.4% Asian, 0.1% from other races, and 0.9% from two or more races. Hispanic or Latino of any race were 2.1% of the population.

There were 278 households, of which 31.7% had children under the age of 18 living with them, 61.9% were married couples living together, 4.0% had a female householder with no husband present, 2.5% had a male householder with no wife present, and 31.7% were non-families. 27.7% of all households were made up of individuals, and 13.6% had someone living alone who was 65 years of age or older. The average household size was 2.51 and the average family size was 3.05.

The median age in the city was 37 years. 26.1% of residents were under the age of 18; 7.6% were between the ages of 18 and 24; 24.6% were from 25 to 44; 23.8% were from 45 to 64; and 17.9% were 65 years of age or older. The gender makeup of the city was 49.9% male and 50.1% female.

=== 2000 census ===
As of the census of 2000, there were 672 people, 262 households, and 183 families living in the city. The population density was 1,427.7 inhabitants per square mile (551.2/km^{2}). There were 280 housing units at an average density of 594.9 per square mile (229.7/km^{2}). The racial makeup of the city was 96.28% White, 1.04% Native American, 0.45% Asian, 0.60% from other races, and 1.64% from two or more races. Hispanic or Latino of any race were 0.60% of the population.

There were 262 households, out of which 31.7% had children under the age of 18 living with them, 64.5% were married couples living together, 3.8% had a female householder with no husband present, and 29.8% were non-families. 27.5% of all households were made up of individuals, and 14.5% had someone living alone who was 65 years of age or older. The average household size was 2.56 and the average family size was 3.14.

In the city, the population was spread out, with 28.6% under the age of 18, 8.2% from 18 to 24, 25.1% from 25 to 44, 19.5% from 45 to 64, and 18.6% who were 65 years of age or older. The median age was 37 years. For every 100 females, there were 96.5 males. For every 100 females age 18 and over, there were 90.5 males.

The median income for a household in the city was $37,083, and the median income for a family was $39,861. Males had a median income of $31,944 versus $19,464 for females. The per capita income for the city was $17,851. About 5.2% of families and 6.4% of the population were below the poverty line, including 5.7% of those under age 18 and 1.9% of those age 65 or over.

== Education ==
MOC-Floyd Valley Community School District is the local school district. The district formed on July 1, 1994 with the merger of the Maurice-Orange City and Floyd Valley districts. Hospers is home to one elementary school, Hospers Elementary; current enrollment is about 240 students K-5. The current Hospers Elementary building opened in the late 1950s. As per the 2020 bond, the Hospers school will at one point close with students attending elementary school in Orange City. The secondary schools serving Hospers are MOC-Floyd Valley Middle in Alton and MOC-Floyd Valley High in Orange City.

Spalding Catholic closed their Hospers Center in 2013. The associated Spalding Catholic High, in Granville, closed in 2013 with students merged into Gehlen Catholic High School. The upper elementary-middle school in Granville closed in 2017, with middle school students redirected to Gehlen Catholic, leaving a K-6 school in Alton as the only remaining part of Spalding Catholic.

A third elementary school, Hospers Christian, closed in 2003. That building is now home to Hospers Furniture.

== Notable people ==
- Charles B. Hoeven (1895–1980), U.S. representative from Iowa
- Dennis Marion Schnurr, archbishop of the Archdiocese of Cincinnati
