= Charles B. Hoeven =

American politician (1895–1980)

Charles Bernard Hoeven
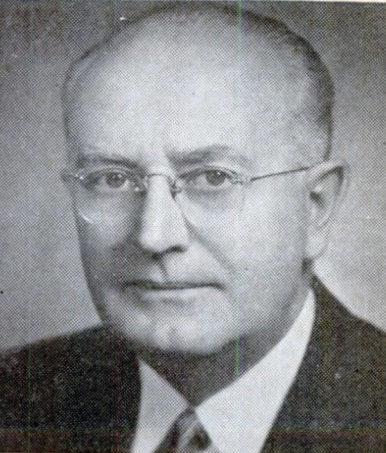
- From 1963's Pocket Congressional Directory of the Eighty-Eighth Congress

Member of the U.S. House of Representatives from Iowa
- In office January 3, 1943 – January 3, 1965
- Preceded by: Fred C. Gilchrist
- Succeeded by: Stanley L. Greigg
- Constituency: 8th district (1943–1963); 6th district (1963–1965)

Member of the Iowa Senate from the 49th district
- In office January 11, 1937 – January 12, 1941
- Preceded by: Garritt E. Roelofs
- Succeeded by: Jans Dykhouse

Personal details
- Born: March 30, 1895 Hospers, Iowa, U.S.
- Died: November 9, 1980 (aged 85) Orange City, Iowa, U.S.
- Resting place: Nassau Township Cemetery, Alton, Iowa, U.S.
- Party: Republican
- Education: University of Iowa

Military service
- Allegiance: United States of America
- Branch/service: United States Army
- Unit: Company D, 350th Infantry, 88th Division
- Battles/wars: World War I

Charles Bernard Hoeven (March 30, 1895 – November 9, 1980) was an American politician. Elected to represent districts in northern Iowa for eleven terms, from the Seventy-eighth to Eighty-eighth Congresses, in all he held elective office for forty consecutive years. He was a member of the Republican Party.

== Early life and education ==
Hoeven was born in Hospers, Iowa; his paternal grandparents were Dutch immigrants and his maternal grandparents were German immigrants. Hoeven attended the public schools and Alton (Iowa) High School.

During World War I, Hoeven served in England and France as a sergeant in Company D, 350th Infantry, 88th Division, and with the Intelligence Service of the First Battalion.

He received a bachelor's degree from the University of Iowa at Iowa City, in 1920 and a law degree from the University of Iowa College of Law in 1922.

== Political career ==
Hoeven was admitted to the bar in 1922 and began to practice law in Alton, Iowa. He was elected as County Attorney of Sioux County, Iowa in 1924, and served in that position from 1925 to 1937. Then, he was elected to the Iowa Senate, where he served from 1937 to 1941, the last two years as president pro tempore.

In 1940, Hoeven ran for the Republican nomination in Iowa's 9th congressional district (which was then represented by Democrat Vincent Harrington of Sioux City). Hoeven finished a close second to Albert Swanson in the primary, who in turn lost to Harrington in the general election by fewer than 2,500 votes out of over 130,000 cast. Newspapers and others speculated that, if Hoeven had won the primary, he would have defeated Harrington. Thus, when reapportionment shifted most of the old 9th district into Iowa's 8th congressional district, Hoeven became an early front-runner for the 1942 Republican primary to run against Harrington. He won the primary, and received a significant boost when Harrington resigned his House seat and the Democratic nomination two months before the 1942 general election to serve full-time in the U.S. Army Air Corps in England. Democrats quickly nominated new candidates to serve out Harrington's 9th district term and to run against Hoeven in the 8th district, but Hoeven won the 8th district seat by over 19,000 votes.

Hoeven was then re-elected to Congress from that district an additional nine times, the last time in 1960 (when he defeated future U.S. District Court Judge Donald E. O'Brien). Following the 1960 census, Iowa lost a congressional district, and the bulk of his territory was reconfigured as the 6th district. Hoeven was elected again. He chose not to run in 1964, the year in which 48 Republican seats (including Iowa's Sixth District) were lost to Democrats. Hoeven voted in favor of the Civil Rights Acts of 1957, 1960, and 1964, as well as the 24th Amendment to the U.S. Constitution.

Hoeven also served as vice president of a savings bank.

In the Republican Party, Hoeven was a delegate to each Iowa State Republican Convention from 1925 to 1970, serving as chairman of the 1940 state convention. He was a delegate to the 1964 Republican National Convention. In 1942, he also served as temporary and permanent chairman of Iowa Republican State Judicial Convention.

== Retirement and death ==
After retiring from Congress, Hoeven resided in Orange City, Iowa, where he died on November 9, 1980. He was interred in Nassau Township Cemetery, in Alton, Iowa.

U.S. House of Representatives
Preceded by Fred C. Gilchrist	Member of the U.S. House of Representatives from Iowa's 8th congressional district 1943 – 1963	District eliminated
Preceded by Merwin Coad	Member of the U.S. House of Representatives from Iowa's 6th congressional district 1963 – 1965	Succeeded by Stanley L. Greigg
