= Sioux County Courthouse (Iowa) =

- U.S. National Register of Historic Places
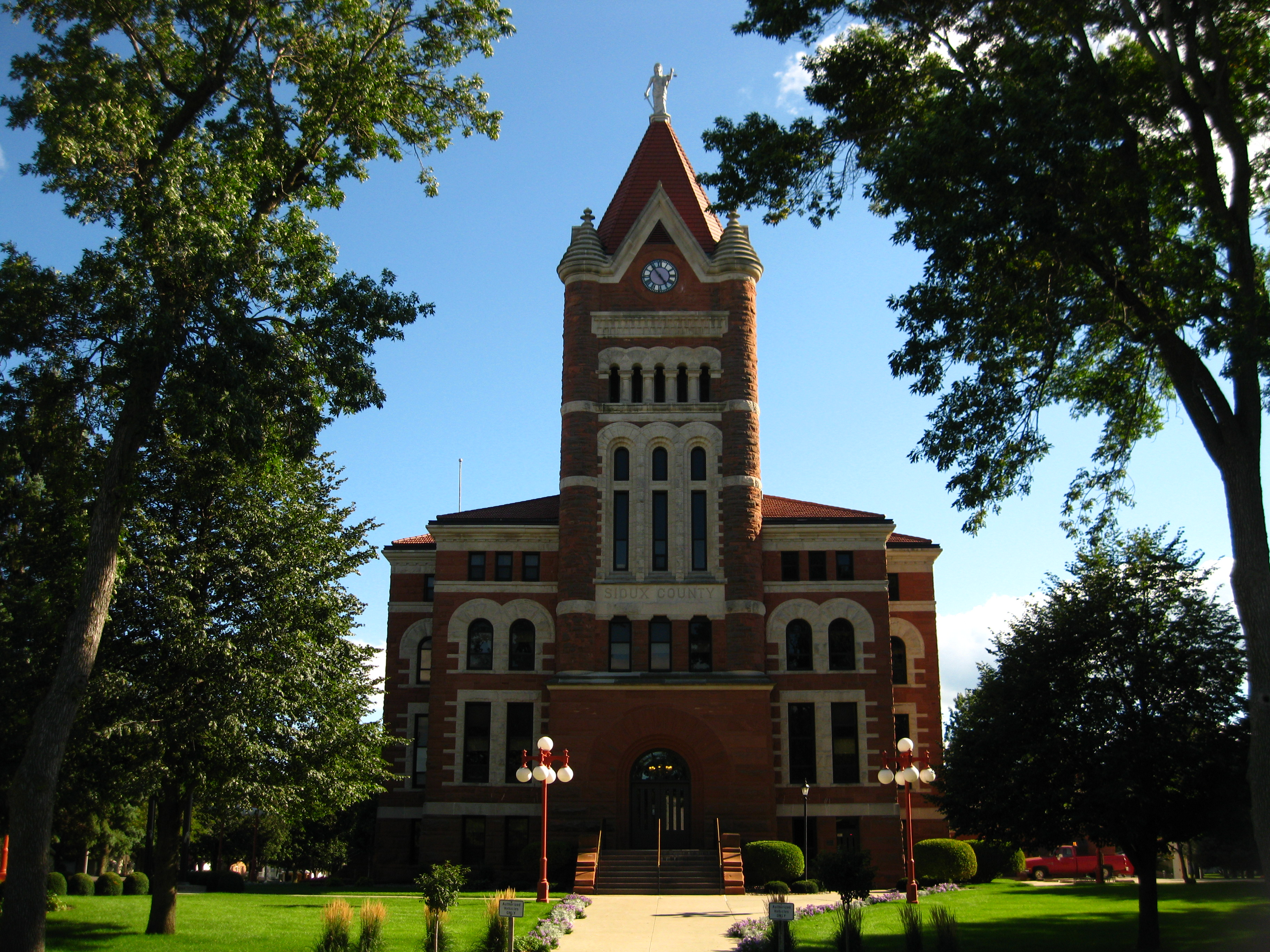

- Location within Iowa Location within the United States
- Interactive map showing the location for Sioux County Courthouse
- Location: Off Iowa Highway 10, Orange City, Iowa
- Coordinates: 43°0′16″N 96°3′30″W
- Built: 1902–1904
- Architect: Beach, Wilfred W.
- Architectural style: Romanesque Revival, Richardsonian Romanesque
- MPS: County Courthouses in Iowa TR (AD)
- NRHP reference No.: 77000559
- Added to NRHP: April 11, 1977

The Sioux County Courthouse is a Richardsonian Romanesque courthouse in Orange City, Iowa, the county seat of Sioux County, Iowa. Designed by Wilfred Warren (W.W.) Beach, it was built from 1902 to 1904.

== History ==
Sioux County was organized on January 20, 1860, on land occupied by the indigenous Sioux until they were forced to abandon it under the terms of the fourth Treaty of Prairie du Chien in 1830. The original courthouse was a log structure on the Big Sioux River in the hamlet of Calliope, Iowa (now part of Hawarden). That building was part office, part residence, and part fort, but in 1869–1870 the White residents of Calliope fled to Sioux City, Iowa, 40 miles to the south, temporarily abandoning the log courthouse during renewed armed Native American resistance to the newcomers. The courthouse was sold off soon after the Whites returned, when after a referendum in 1872 the county seat was moved to Orange City. Sioux County had no central county offices until the present courthouse was finished over 30 years later. With the approval of a bond issue, Sioux County selected W.W. Beach (1872–1937) as its architect. Beach had been born in 1872, the same year that the county seat was moved to Orange City. His birthplace was Alton, in Sioux County, just three miles east of the new county seat. Beach had established his architectural practice in Sioux City only in 1899, with his first major commission being the Main Hall (later Lewis Hall) for Morningside College in that city. By the time the Sioux County Courthouse was completed, Beach had hired promising young William L. Steele (1875–1949) as his draftsman, and the two would later form a brief partnership.

Construction on the courthouse began in June 1902, but the construction company went bankrupt, delaying completion until October 1904. Just five years later, lightning destroyed the top of the tower in 1907, and it was replaced with a hip roof and a 10-foot-tall cast bronze statue personifying Justice (Vrouwe Justitia).

The clock mechanism was built by E. Howard & Co. and was originally weight-driven, requiring staff to "wind" the clock frequently. As electricity became prevalent, the clock was converted to use an electric motor, making it easier to maintain and more accurate. Most of the original clock was preserved during this upgrade.

The building was extensively renovated in 1976–1982, and was added to the National Register of Historic Places in 1977.

== Architecture ==
Beach's design is classic, muscular Richardsonian Romanesque, an architectural style developed by Henry Hobson Richardson. Although of high quality, its timing is unusual, since that style was associated with the late 1880s rather than the early 20th century. More typically in Iowa or nearby South Dakota at this time, public buildings were done in a classical revival style, influenced by the World's Columbian Exposition, held in Chicago in 1893. However, two nearby South Dakota counties had built Richardsonian Romanesque courthouses just prior to this time: Union County (Elk Point, 1898) and Lincoln County (Canton, 1899).

A deep rusticated arch forms the principal entrance at the base of the courthouse central tower, which is six stories tall. Doors and windows appear to be cut deeply into the dark red sandstone, and the effect is heightened by the light buff sandstone trim.

== See also ==
- List of Iowa county courthouses
