= MOC-Floyd Valley Community School District =

Public school district in Orange City, Iowa, United States

Coordinates: 42.998300°N 96.049975°W

Location
- Orange City, Iowa Sioux County and O'Brien County United States
- Coordinates: 42.998300, -96.049975

District information
- Type: Local school district
- Grades: K-12
- Established: 1994
- Superintendent: Mike Mulder
- Schools: 3
- Budget: $23,920,000 (2020-21)
- NCES District ID: 1918840

Students and staff
- Students: 1559 (2022-23)
- Teachers: 106.17 FTE
- Staff: 101.79FTE
- Student–teacher ratio: 14.68
- Athletic conference: Siouxland
- District mascot: Dutchmen/Lady Dutch
- Colors: Purple and White

Other information
- Website: mocfv.org

MOC-Floyd Valley Community School District is a rural public school district headquartered in Orange City, Iowa.

Most of the district is in Sioux County with a portion in O'Brien County. It serves Orange City, Alton, Hospers, Granville, and Maurice.

== History ==
The district formed on July 1, 1992, with the merger of the Maurice-Orange City and Floyd Valley districts.

In 2020, the district proposed a bond to build a new, larger elementary school for $37 million. Each year, on average, until 2020 the elementary school enrollment increased by 18. It was scheduled for March 3, 2020. The measure was passed 63.46% to 36.54%; 60% was the required threshold.

== Schools ==
Schools include:

- MOC-Floyd Valley High School (Orange City)
- MOC-Floyd Valley Middle School (Alton)
- Orange City Elementary School
  - The current Orange City Elementary building opened in the early 1920s. As per the 2020 bond it will be rebuilt.
- Hospers Elementary School
  - The current Hospers Elementary building opened in the late 1950s. As per the 2020 bond, the Hospers school will close with students attending Orange City.

== MOC-Floyd Valley High School ==
=== Athletics ===
The Dutchmen and Lady Dutch are members of the Siouxland Conference, and participate in the following sports:

- Football
- Cross Country
- Volleyball
  - (2-time State Champions - 2012, 2013)
- Basketball
  - Girls' 2014 State Champions
  - Boys' 4-time State Champions (1988, 1989, 2005, 2024)
- Wrestling
- Golf
  - Boys’ 2023 Class 3A State Champions
- Soccer
- Track and Field
  - Boys' (2-time State Champions - 1961, 1973)
- Baseball
- Softball

=== Fine Arts ===
The "Pride of the Dutchmen Marching Band" represents MOC-Floyd Valley High School in Orange City, Iowa. The band competes regionally in Iowa, Nebraska, Minnesota, and South Dakota. The band is a four-time Bands of America Regional Championship Finalist and was the Bands of America Iowa Regional Class 1A Champion in 2022 and 2024. The band has performed in numerous local and national parades, including the Hollywood Christmas Parade and Main Street U.S.A. at Disneyland in 2024, Universal Studios Florida and Disney’s Magic Kingdom in 2021, the Hollywood Christmas Parade in 2016, and has made two appearances at the Tournament of Roses Parade in Pasadena, California, in 2013 and 1993. Each year, the band hosts the Dutchmen Field Championship, a field marching competition featuring bands from Iowa, South Dakota, Minnesota, and Nebraska.

The MOC-Floyd Valley High School band program includes three jazz band, Dutchmen Jazz 1, Dutchmen Jazz 2 and Jazz Lab. Dutchmen Jazz 1 has performed numerous times at Iowa Jazz Championships, most recently earning 4th place in Class 3A in 2025.

== See also ==
- List of school districts in Iowa
- List of high schools in Iowa
