= Ireton, Iowa =

- City
- Location of Ireton, Iowa
- Coordinates: 42°58′30″N 96°19′18″W
- Country: United States
- State: Iowa
- County: Sioux

Area
  - Total: 1.02 sq mi (2.64 km^{2})
  - Land: 1.02 sq mi (2.64 km^{2})
  - Water: 0 sq mi (0.00 km^{2})
- Elevation: 1,411 ft (430 m)

Population (2020)
  - Total: 590
  - Density: 578.4/sq mi (223.34/km^{2})
- Time zone: UTC-6 (Central (CST))
  - Summer (DST): UTC-5 (CDT)
- ZIP code: 51027
- Area code: 712
- FIPS code: 19-38820
- GNIS feature ID: 2395434
- Website: City of Ireton

Ireton is a city in Sioux County, Iowa, United States. The population was 590 at the time of the 2020 census.

== History ==
Ireton was platted in 1882. It was named after Henry Ireton, who served under Oliver Cromwell during the English Civil War. A post office has been in operation in Ireton since 1882.

== Geography ==
Indian Creek, a tributary of the Big Sioux River flows through the northern part of the city.

According to the United States Census Bureau, the city has a total area of 1.01 square miles (2.62 km^{2}), all land. The famous Ireton Christian school is located here.

== Demographics ==
Historical populations
Year	Pop.	±%
1890	412	—
1900	545	+32.3%
1910	631	+15.8%
1920	730	+15.7%
1930	612	−16.2%
1940	653	+6.7%
1950	573	−12.3%
1960	510	−11.0%
1970	582	+14.1%
1980	588	+1.0%
1990	597	+1.5%
2000	585	−2.0%
2010	609	+4.1%
2020	590	−3.1%
Source:"U.S. Census website". United States Census Bureau. and Iowa Data Center; Source: U.S. Decennial Census

=== 2020 census ===
As of the census of 2020, there were 590 people, 233 households, and 162 families residing in the city. The population density was 578.4 inhabitants per square mile (223.3/km^{2}). There were 255 housing units at an average density of 250.0 per square mile (96.5/km^{2}). The racial makeup of the city was 92.4% White, 0.0% Black or African American, 0.2% Native American, 0.2% Asian, 0.0% Pacific Islander, 2.5% from other races and 4.7% from two or more races. Hispanic or Latino persons of any race comprised 5.9% of the population.

Of the 233 households, 30.5% of which had children under the age of 18 living with them, 60.1% were married couples living together, 3.0% were cohabitating couples, 20.2% had a female householder with no spouse or partner present and 16.7% had a male householder with no spouse or partner present. 30.5% of all households were non-families. 26.6% of all households were made up of individuals, 14.6% had someone living alone who was 65 years old or older.

The median age in the city was 38.0 years. 27.6% of the residents were under the age of 20; 5.6% were between the ages of 20 and 24; 26.3% were from 25 and 44; 23.6% were from 45 and 64; and 16.9% were 65 years of age or older. The gender makeup of the city was 50.0% male and 50.0% female.

=== 2010 census ===
As of the census of 2010, there were 609 people, 246 households, and 174 families living in the city. The population density was 603.0 inhabitants per square mile (232.8/km^{2}). There were 256 housing units at an average density of 253.5 per square mile (97.9/km^{2}). The racial makeup of the city was 97.9% White, 0.2% African American, 1.8% from other races, and 0.2% from two or more races. Hispanic or Latino of any race were 3.6% of the population.

There were 246 households, of which 32.5% had children under the age of 18 living with them, 61.4% were married couples living together, 5.3% had a female householder with no husband present, 4.1% had a male householder with no wife present, and 29.3% were non-families. 26.0% of all households were made up of individuals, and 14.7% had someone living alone who was 65 years of age or older. The average household size was 2.48 and the average family size was 3.01.

The median age in the city was 38.6 years. 26.3% of residents were under the age of 18; 5.7% were between the ages of 18 and 24; 25.7% were from 25 to 44; 25% were from 45 to 64; and 17.1% were 65 years of age or older. The gender makeup of the city was 48.1% male and 51.9% female.

=== 2000 census ===
As of the census of 2000, there were 585 people, 235 households, and 172 families living in the city. The population density was 581.4 inhabitants per square mile (224.5/km^{2}). There were 249 housing units at an average density of 247.5 per square mile (95.6/km^{2}). The racial makeup of the city was 99.15% White, 0.17% Asian, and 0.68% from two or more races. Hispanic or Latino of any race were 0.34% of the population.

There were 235 households, out of which 32.8% had children under the age of 18 living with them, 66.0% were married couples living together, 6.4% had a female householder with no husband present, and 26.4% were non-families. 25.1% of all households were made up of individuals, and 14.5% had someone living alone who was 65 years of age or older. The average household size was 2.49 and the average family size was 2.97.

In the city, the population was spread out, with 25.3% under the age of 18, 8.5% from 18 to 24, 25.0% from 25 to 44, 20.7% from 45 to 64, and 20.5% who were 65 years of age or older. The median age was 39 years. For every 100 females, there were 95.0 males. For every 100 females age 18 and over, there were 94.2 males.

The median income for a household in the city was $36,250, and the median income for a family was $44,063. Males had a median income of $30,673 versus $18,750 for females. The per capita income for the city was $16,879. About 1.7% of families and 1.0% of the population were below the poverty line, including none of those under age 18 and 4.8% of those age 65 or over.

== Education ==
Ireton, Hawarden, Chatsworth, and surrounding rural areas formed the West Sioux Community School District in the fall of 1959. Prior to that time, education in Ireton was provided by the Ireton Public School. The town is home to the Ireton Elementary Center which offers classes for grades kindergarten through first.

The town is also home to Ireton Christian School. The Ireton Christian School offers classes for grades Kindergarten through eight. It is a member of Christian Schools International.

== Notable people ==
- Stanley L. Greigg, member of the U.S. House of Representatives
- Terry L. Huitink, Judge, Iowa Court of Appeals
