= Logan Township, Sioux County, Iowa =

Township in Iowa, USA

Coordinates: 42.941171°N 96.4822950°W

Logan Township is a township in Sioux County, Iowa, USA.
