= Capel Township, Sioux County, Iowa =

Township in Sioux County, Iowa, United States

Coordinates: 43°08′N 96°02′W

Capel Township is a township in Sioux County, Iowa, United States.
