= Spalding Catholic School =

Location
- Current K-6 building: 908 6th Ave, Alton, Iowa 51003; Former Granville secondary: 521 Broad Street, Granville, Iowa 51022; Former Hospers building: 505 Cedar St. Hospers, Iowa 51238; United States
- Coordinates: 42.988210°N 96.014860°W

Information
- Type: Private, Coeducational
- Religious affiliation: Roman Catholic
- Established: 1962
- Status: K-6 only: high school closed 2013, middle school closed 2017
- Grades: K-6 (formerly up to 12)
- Colors: Black and Gold
- Athletics conference: War Eagle
- Team name: Spartans
- Rival: St. Mary's High School (Remsen, Iowa)
- Website: http://www.spaldingcatholic.org

Spalding Catholic School is a private, Roman Catholic elementary school in Alton, Iowa. It is located in the Roman Catholic Diocese of Sioux City. The school formerly was a K-12 school system under the name Spalding Catholic Schools, headquartered in Granville, that included Spalding Catholic High School.

The high closed at the end of the 2013 school year and with its component unified into Gehlen Catholic High School in LeMars. Middle school closed in 2017, and accordingly Spalding Catholic School is now a PreK through 6th grade system.

Students came from Granville, Alton, and Hospers.

== History ==
Spalding High School was opened in 1962. It replaced several smaller high schools run by parishes in and around Granville, including St. Mary's (Alton), St. Anthony's (Hospers), and St. Joseph's (Granville). It was named after John Lancaster Spalding, first bishop of the Diocese of Peoria and Catholic education advocate.

In the early 2010s its secondary schools were in Granville while Alton and Hospers housed primary school centers.

Spalding Catholic High School merged with Gehlen Catholic High School for the 2013–14 school year. Spalding Catholic School was now a K-8 school with grades PreK through 2 in Alton and 3 through 8 in Granville. The Hospers campus also closed in 2013.

The Granville upper elementary-middle school campus closed in 2017, and middle school students are now attending Gehlen Catholic School in LeMars. The only remaining component of Spalding Catholic is the elementary school in Alton. The Granville middle school building is now used as St. Joseph's Parish Center.

== Athletics ==
Spalding Catholic was a member of the Iowa High School Athletic Association. They won the following IHSAA State Championships:

- Boys Baseball - 1974, 1975, 1989, 2000, 2001 (Runner-Up - 1992, 2003, 2005)
- Boys Baseball (Fall League) - 1971, 1976 (Runner-Up - 1965, 1973, 1974)

John Quinlan of the Sioux City Journal wrote that the school's 1972 surprise victory against Des Moines Roosevelt High School in basketball formed a "tradition that still lasts" in 2002.

== Notable alumni ==
- Dennis Marion Schnurr, Archbishop of Cincinnati, former Bishop of Duluth
