= Eagle Township, Sioux County, Iowa =

Township in Iowa, USA

Coordinates: 43°02′N 96°23′W

Eagle Township is a township in Sioux County, Iowa, United States.
