= Howard Heemstra =

American architect

Howard Heemstra was an architect, professor of architecture, and photographer. He was born in Orange City, Iowa on December 22, 1928 and died in Ames, Iowa on July 22, 2011. He graduated from Northwestern Academy (1946), and Northwestern Junior College in Orange City in 1948 before earning a Bachelor of Architecture degree from Iowa State University in 1952. After working briefly in Sioux City for an architecture firm Heemstra joined the US Army and served two years in the Korean War. After returning from abroad he applied for graduate studies to Harvard University and the Cranbrook Academy of Arts in Bloomfield, Michigan. Since he could not afford Harvard's tuition he enrolled at Cranbrook and earned his Master of Architecture degree in 1958. Heemstra worked twelve years as an architect before joining Iowa State University in 1966. He became a full professor in 1976 and continued to teach until his retirement in 2003, when he was named Professor Emeritus. Heemstra worked at Ray Crites' architectural office in Cedar Rapids when the commission for Stephens Auditorium, part of the Iowa State Center on the Iowa State University campus, came to the firm, and he was the project architect for the building which was completed in 1969. Stephens Auditorium was selected as the "Building of the Century" by the Iowa chapter of the American Institute of Architects in 2004.
