= Holland Township, Iowa =

Township in Iowa, USA

Coordinates: 43°02′N 96°02′W

Holland Township is a township in Sioux County, Iowa, USA.
