= Center Township, Sioux County, Iowa =

Township in Iowa, USA

Coordinates: 43°02′N 96°16′W

Center Township is a township in Sioux County, Iowa, USA.
