= Chatsworth, Iowa =

- City
- Location of Chatsworth, Iowa
- Coordinates: 42°54′59″N 96°30′52″W
- Country: United States
- State: Iowa
- County: Sioux
- Incorporated: December 31, 1900

Area
  - Total: 0.50 sq mi (1.29 km^{2})
  - Land: 0.50 sq mi (1.29 km^{2})
  - Water: 0 sq mi (0.00 km^{2})
- Elevation: 1,161 ft (354 m)

Population (2020)
  - Total: 75
  - Density: 150.8/sq mi (58.24/km^{2})
- Time zone: UTC-6 (Central (CST))
  - Summer (DST): UTC-5 (CDT)
- ZIP code: 51011
- Area code: 712
- FIPS code: 19-12945
- GNIS feature ID: 2393811

Chatsworth is a city in Sioux County, Iowa, United States. The population was 75 at the 2020 census.

== Geography ==
According to the United States Census Bureau, the city has a total area of 0.49 square miles (1.27 km^{2}), all land.

== Demographics ==
Historical populations
Year	Pop.	±%
1910	131	—
1920	150	+14.5%
1930	159	+6.0%
1940	144	−9.4%
1950	102	−29.2%
1960	84	−17.6%
1970	90	+7.1%
1980	110	+22.2%
1990	103	−6.4%
2000	89	−13.6%
2010	79	−11.2%
2020	75	−5.1%
Source:"U.S. Census website". United States Census Bureau. and Iowa Data Center; Source: U.S. Decennial Census

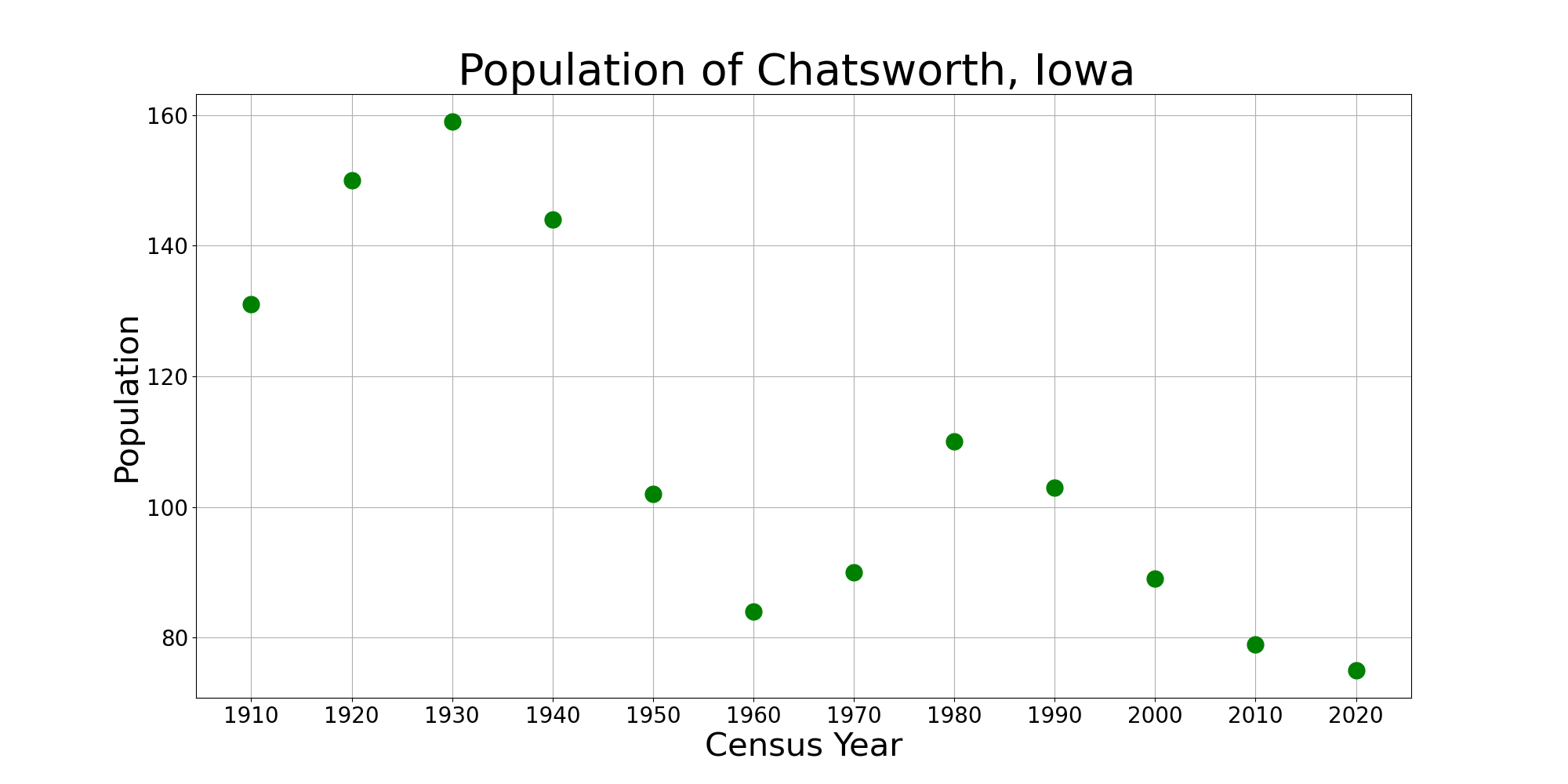
The population of Chatsworth, Iowa from US census data

=== 2020 census ===
As of the census of 2020, there were 75 people, 28 households, and 19 families residing in the city. The population density was 150.8 inhabitants per square mile (58.2/km^{2}). There were 39 housing units at an average density of 78.4 per square mile (30.3/km^{2}). The racial makeup of the city was 84.0% White, 1.3% Black or African American, 5.3% Native American, 0.0% Asian, 0.0% Pacific Islander, 0.0% from other races and 9.3% from two or more races. Hispanic or Latino persons of any race comprised 1.3% of the population.

Of the 28 households, 35.7% of which had children under the age of 18 living with them, 46.4% were married couples living together, 7.1% were cohabitating couples, 21.4% had a female householder with no spouse or partner present and 25.0% had a male householder with no spouse or partner present. 32.1% of all households were non-families. 25.0% of all households were made up of individuals, 0.0% had someone living alone who was 65 years old or older.

The median age in the city was 44.5 years. 30.7% of the residents were under the age of 20; 8.0% were between the ages of 20 and 24; 12.0% were from 25 and 44; 36.0% were from 45 and 64; and 13.3% were 65 years of age or older. The gender makeup of the city was 58.7% male and 41.3% female.

=== 2010 census ===
As of the census of 2010, there were 79 people, 31 households, and 21 families living in the city. The population density was 161.2 inhabitants per square mile (62.2/km^{2}). There were 41 housing units at an average density of 83.7 per square mile (32.3/km^{2}). The racial makeup of the city was 98.7% White and 1.3% from other races. Hispanic or Latino of any race were 1.3% of the population.

There were 31 households, of which 32.3% had children under the age of 18 living with them, 48.4% were married couples living together, 9.7% had a female householder with no husband present, 9.7% had a male householder with no wife present, and 32.3% were non-families. 29.0% of all households were made up of individuals, and 9.7% had someone living alone who was 65 years of age or older. The average household size was 2.55 and the average family size was 3.19.

The median age in the city was 41.8 years. 25.3% of residents were under the age of 18; 8.8% were between the ages of 18 and 24; 19% were from 25 to 44; 35.5% were from 45 to 64; and 11.4% were 65 years of age or older. The gender makeup of the city was 55.7% male and 44.3% female.

=== 2000 census ===
As of the census of 2000, there were 89 people, 36 households, and 23 families living in the city. The population density was 182.7 inhabitants per square mile (70.5/km^{2}). There were 45 housing units at an average density of 92.4 per square mile (35.7/km^{2}). The racial makeup of the city was 97.75% White, 1.12% African American and 1.12% Native American.

There were 36 households, out of which 33.3% had children under the age of 18 living with them, 47.2% were married couples living together, 2.8% had a female householder with no husband present, and 36.1% were non-families. 30.6% of all households were made up of individuals, and 13.9% had someone living alone who was 65 years of age or older. The average household size was 2.47 and the average family size was 3.09.

In the city, the population was spread out, with 31.5% under the age of 18, 4.5% from 18 to 24, 32.6% from 25 to 44, 16.9% from 45 to 64, and 14.6% who were 65 years of age or older. The median age was 35 years. For every 100 females, there were 117.1 males. For every 100 females age 18 and over, there were 103.3 males.

The median income for a household in the city was $18,333, and the median income for a family was $25,625. Males had a median income of $35,833 versus $16,875 for females. The per capita income for the city was $12,673. There were 19.0% of families and 38.1% of the population living below the poverty line, including 59.3% of under eighteens and 25.0% of those over 64.

== Education ==
Ireton, Hawarden, Chatsworth, and surrounding rural areas formed the West Sioux Community School District in the fall of 1959.
