= Buncombe Township, Sioux County, Iowa =

Township in Sioux County, Iowa, United States

Coordinates: 43°02′N 96°28′W

Buncombe Township is a township in Sioux County, Iowa, United States.
