= Garfield Township, Sioux County, Iowa =

Township in Iowa, USA

Coordinates: 43°08′N 96°24′W

Garfield Township is a township in Sioux County, Iowa, USA.
