= Terry L. Huitink =

American judge

Terry L. Huitink (December 2, 1951 – June 22, 2014) was an American jurist.

Born in Orange City, Iowa, Huitink moved with his family to Ireton, Iowa in 1961. He graduated from West Sioux High School in 1970. He received his bachelor's degree from University of Iowa and his law degree from Drake University. He practiced law in Ireton, Iowa and was the Ireton City Attorney. In 1988, Huitink was appointed an Iowa District Court judge. Then from 1994 to 2008, Huitink served on the Iowa Court of Appeals. He died in a hospital in Spirit Lake, Iowa.
