= James T. Klein =

American politician (1937–2022)

Member of the Iowa House of Representatives
- In office 1967–1971

Personal details
- Born: July 31, 1937 Alton, Iowa, U.S.
- Died: December 25, 2022 (aged 85)
- Party: Republican

James Tackett Klein (July 31, 1937 – December 25, 2022) was an American politician in the state of Iowa.

== Biography ==
Klein was born in Alton, Iowa. He graduated from Alton Public High School in 1955 and received a B.A. from Buena Vista College in 1961. Following his college graduation, he was drafted into the United States Army Corps of Engineers and was honorably discharged in 1963.

He served in the Iowa House of Representatives from 1967 to 1971 as a Republican. Between legislative sessions, he worked as a planning analyst for Walker Manufacturing Company. Klein died on December 25, 2022, at the age of 85.
