= Lincoln Township, Sioux County, Iowa =

Township in Iowa, USA

Coordinates: 43°13′N 96°09′W

Lincoln Township is a township in Sioux County, Iowa, USA.
