= Maurice, Iowa =

- City
- Location of Maurice, Iowa
- Coordinates: 42°57′59″N 96°10′57″W
- Country: United States
- State: Iowa
- County: Sioux

Area
  - Total: 0.61 sq mi (1.57 km^{2})
  - Land: 0.60 sq mi (1.56 km^{2})
  - Water: 0.0039 sq mi (0.01 km^{2})
- Elevation: 1,312 ft (400 m)

Population (2020)
  - Total: 265
  - Density: 440.3/sq mi (170.01/km^{2})
- Time zone: UTC-6 (Central (CST))
  - Summer (DST): UTC-5 (CDT)
- ZIP code: 51036
- Area code: 712
- FIPS code: 19-50430
- GNIS feature ID: 2395047
- Website: cityofmaurice.com

Maurice is a city in Sioux County, Iowa, United States, along the West Branch of the Floyd River. The population was 265 at the time of the 2020 census. It is home to the Sioux County Regional Airport and the "Famous Maurice Fire Escape Slide" in the town park.

== History ==
Maurice was platted in 1882. It was named for Maurice, Prince of Orange. A post office has been in operation in Maurice since 1882.

== Geography ==
According to the United States Census Bureau, the city has a total area of 0.56 square miles (1.45 km^{2}), of which 0.55 square miles (1.42 km^{2}) is land and 0.01 square miles (0.03 km^{2}) is water.

== Demographics ==
Historical populations
Year	Pop.	±%
1900	280	—
1910	290	+3.6%
1920	329	+13.4%
1930	274	−16.7%
1940	272	−0.7%
1950	256	−5.9%
1960	237	−7.4%
1970	266	+12.2%
1980	288	+8.3%
1990	243	−15.6%
2000	254	+4.5%
2010	275	+8.3%
2020	265	−3.6%
Source:"U.S. Census website". United States Census Bureau. and Iowa Data Center; Source: U.S. Decennial Census

=== 2020 census ===
As of the census of 2020, there were 265 people, 105 households, and 77 families residing in the city. The population density was 440.3 inhabitants per square mile (170.0/km^{2}). There were 106 housing units at an average density of 176.1 per square mile (68.0/km^{2}). The racial makeup of the city was 87.2% White, 0.4% Black or African American, 0.4% Native American, 0.0% Asian, 0.0% Pacific Islander, 8.7% from other races and 3.4% from two or more races. Hispanic or Latino persons of any race comprised 12.8% of the population.

Of the 105 households, 30.5% of which had children under the age of 18 living with them, 65.7% were married couples living together, 4.8% were cohabitating couples, 13.3% had a female householder with no spouse or partner present and 16.2% had a male householder with no spouse or partner present. 26.7% of all households were non-families. 20.0% of all households were made up of individuals, 8.6% had someone living alone who was 65 years old or older.

The median age in the city was 39.5 years. 29.8% of the residents were under the age of 20; 2.6% were between the ages of 20 and 24; 23.8% were from 25 and 44; 25.7% were from 45 and 64; and 18.1% were 65 years of age or older. The gender makeup of the city was 50.6% male and 49.4% female.

=== 2010 census ===
As of the census of 2010, there were 275 people, 102 households, and 81 families residing in the city. The population density was 500.0 inhabitants per square mile (193.1/km^{2}). There were 107 housing units at an average density of 194.5 per square mile (75.1/km^{2}). The racial makeup of the city was 95.6% White, 0.4% African American, 3.3% from other races, and 0.7% from two or more races. Hispanic or Latino of any race were 5.8% of the population.

There were 102 households, of which 34.3% had children under the age of 18 living with them, 72.5% were married couples living together, 4.9% had a female householder with no husband present, 2.0% had a male householder with no wife present, and 20.6% were non-families. 15.7% of all households were made up of individuals, and 6.9% had someone living alone who was 65 years of age or older. The average household size was 2.70 and the average family size was 3.02.

The median age in the city was 34.6 years. 25.8% of residents were under the age of 18; 10.5% were between the ages of 18 and 24; 23.8% were from 25 to 44; 25.4% were from 45 to 64; and 14.5% were 65 years of age or older. The gender makeup of the city was 52.0% male and 48.0% female.

=== 2000 census ===
As of the census of 2000, there were 254 people, 95 households, and 76 families residing in the city. The population density was 471.0 inhabitants per square mile (181.9/km^{2}). There were 103 housing units at an average density of 191.0 per square mile (73.7/km^{2}). The racial makeup of the city was 100.00% White.

There were 95 households, out of which 32.6% had children under the age of 18 living with them, 77.9% were married couples living together, and 20.0% were non-families. 17.9% of all households were made up of individuals, and 10.5% had someone living alone who was 65 years of age or older. The average household size was 2.67 and the average family size was 3.05.

In the city, the population was spread out, with 26.0% under the age of 18, 8.7% from 18 to 24, 24.4% from 25 to 44, 23.2% from 45 to 64, and 17.7% who were 65 years of age or older. The median age was 39 years. For every 100 females, there were 113.4 males. For every 100 females age 18 and over, there were 116.1 males.

The median income for a household in the city was $41,591, and the median income for a family was $41,705. Males had a median income of $30,347 versus $21,250 for females. The per capita income for the city was $15,455. None of the population or families were below the poverty line.

== Education ==
MOC-Floyd Valley Community School District is the local school district. The district formed on July 1, 1994 with the merger of the Maurice-Orange City and Floyd Valley districts.
