= Floyd River =

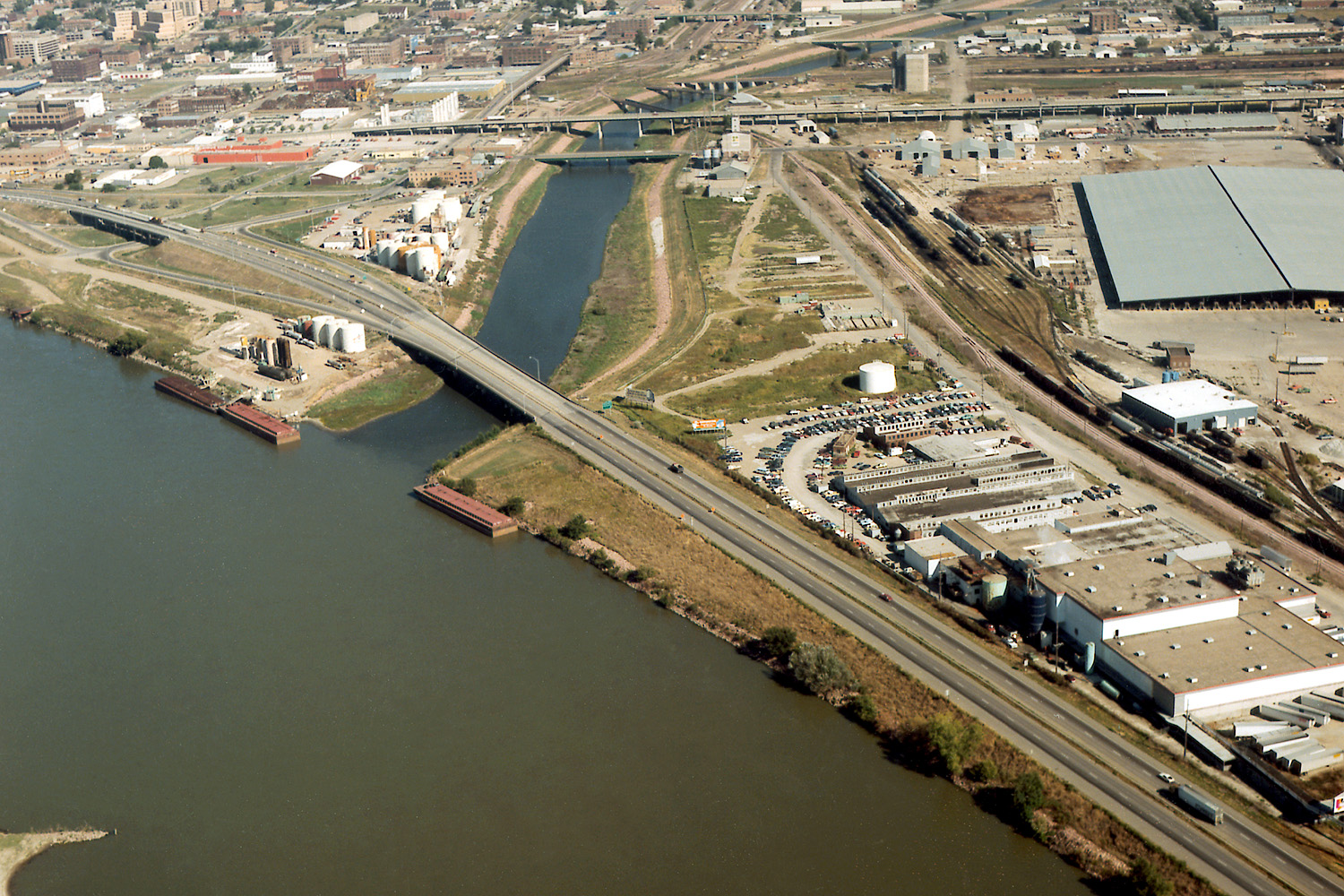
- Confluence of the Missouri and Floyd Rivers in Sioux City

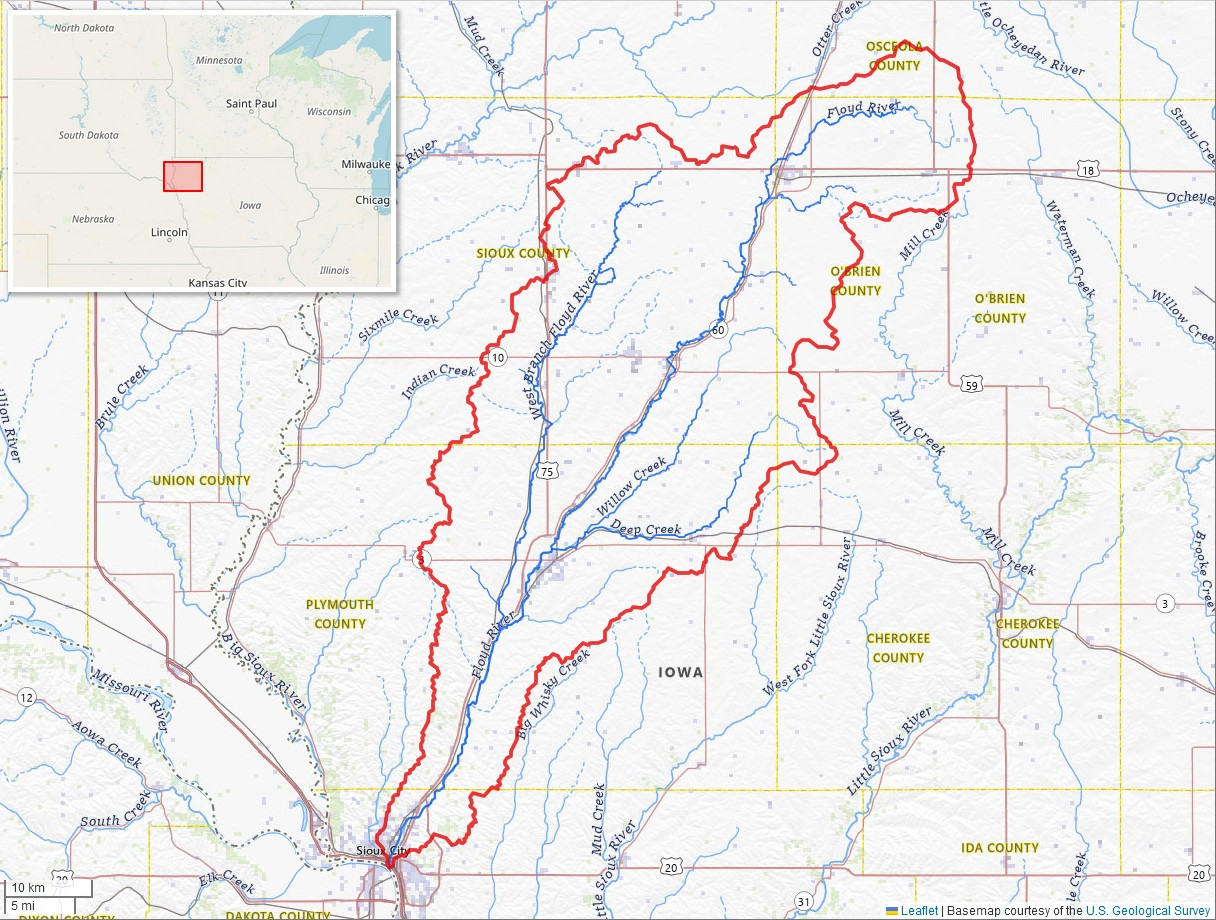
- Floyd River watershed (Interactive map)

Location
- Country: United States
- State: Iowa
- District: Woodbury County, Iowa, Plymouth County, Iowa, Sioux County, Iowa, O'Brien County, Iowa

Physical characteristics
- Source
  - location: O'Brien County, near Silver Ave and 290th St.
  - coordinates: 43.242°N 95.621°W
- Mouth: Missouri River
  - coordinates: 42.483°N 96.392°W
  - elevation: 1,079 ft (329 m)
- Basin size: 2,400 km^{2} (930 sq mi)
- Discharge
  - location: mouth
  - average: 340 cu ft/s (9.6 m^{3}/s) (estimate)

The Floyd River is a tributary of the Missouri River, 112 miles (180 km) long, in northwestern Iowa in the United States. It enters the Missouri at Sioux City, and is named for Charles Floyd, a member of the Lewis and Clark Expedition.

== Course ==
The Floyd River rises in northwestern O'Brien County near the town of Sanborn and flows generally southwestwardly through Sioux, Plymouth and Woodbury counties, past the towns of Sheldon, Hospers, Alton, Le Mars, Merill, and Hinton. At Merrill the Floyd collects its largest tributary, the West Branch Floyd River, which is about 40 mi (65 km) long. The West Branch rises near Boyden in northeastern Sioux County and flows generally southward into Plymouth County, past Maurice and Struble. The Floyd enters Woodbury County near the Leeds neighborhood of Sioux City.

The Floyd River has come out of its banks on several occasions, causing disastrous flooding in Sioux City in 1892 and 1953. The river has since been the focus of an intensive flood control project. The Floyd's lower channel through Sioux City has been straightened, channelized, lined with riprap and banked by a high earthen levee.

The Floyd River is the site of frequent fish kills caused by runoff of massive amounts of animal waste from farm feedlots into the river.

== Charles Floyd ==
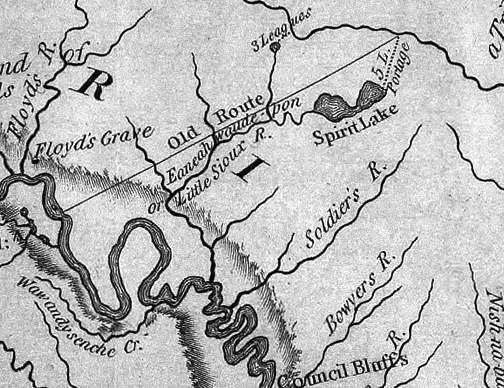
This excerpt from the Lewis and Clark map of 1814 shows the rivers of western Iowa. The Floyd is seen at the upper left of the map.

Charles Floyd, for whom the river is named, was a U.S. Army sergeant who was born in Kentucky and was one of the first to enlist in the Lewis and Clark Expedition. On August 19, 1804, just three months into the two-year journey, Floyd became violently ill and died the next day of what is believed to have been a ruptured appendix. He was buried on a hill overlooking an unnamed river on the Iowa side of the Missouri River. In his honor, the expedition's leaders, Meriwether Lewis and William Clark, named the river Floyd River and the hill Floyd's Bluff. Floyd was the expedition's only casualty, despite the many dangers encountered in the 8,000 miles traveled in reaching the Pacific Ocean and returning to St. Louis.

== Gallery ==
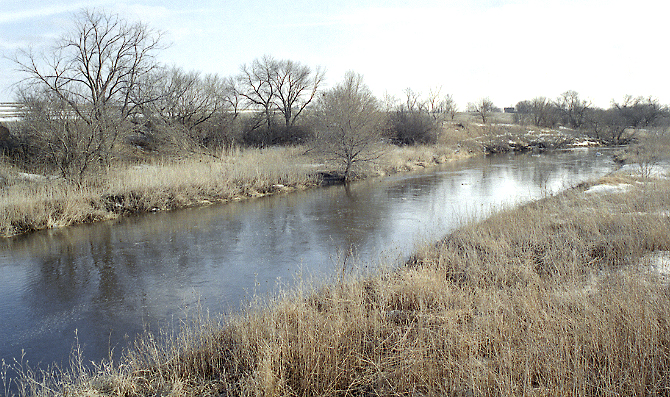
The Floyd River near Le Mars, Iowa

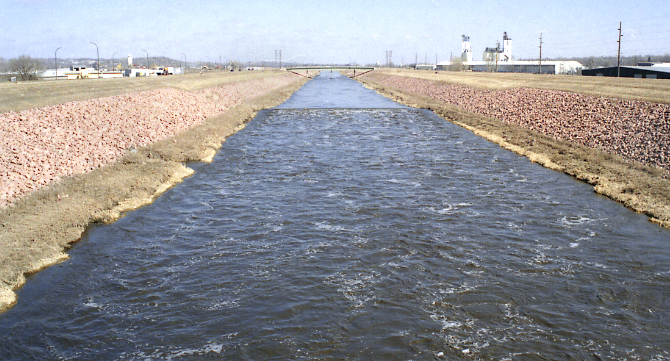
A channelized section of the Floyd River in Sioux City, just above its mouth at the Missouri River

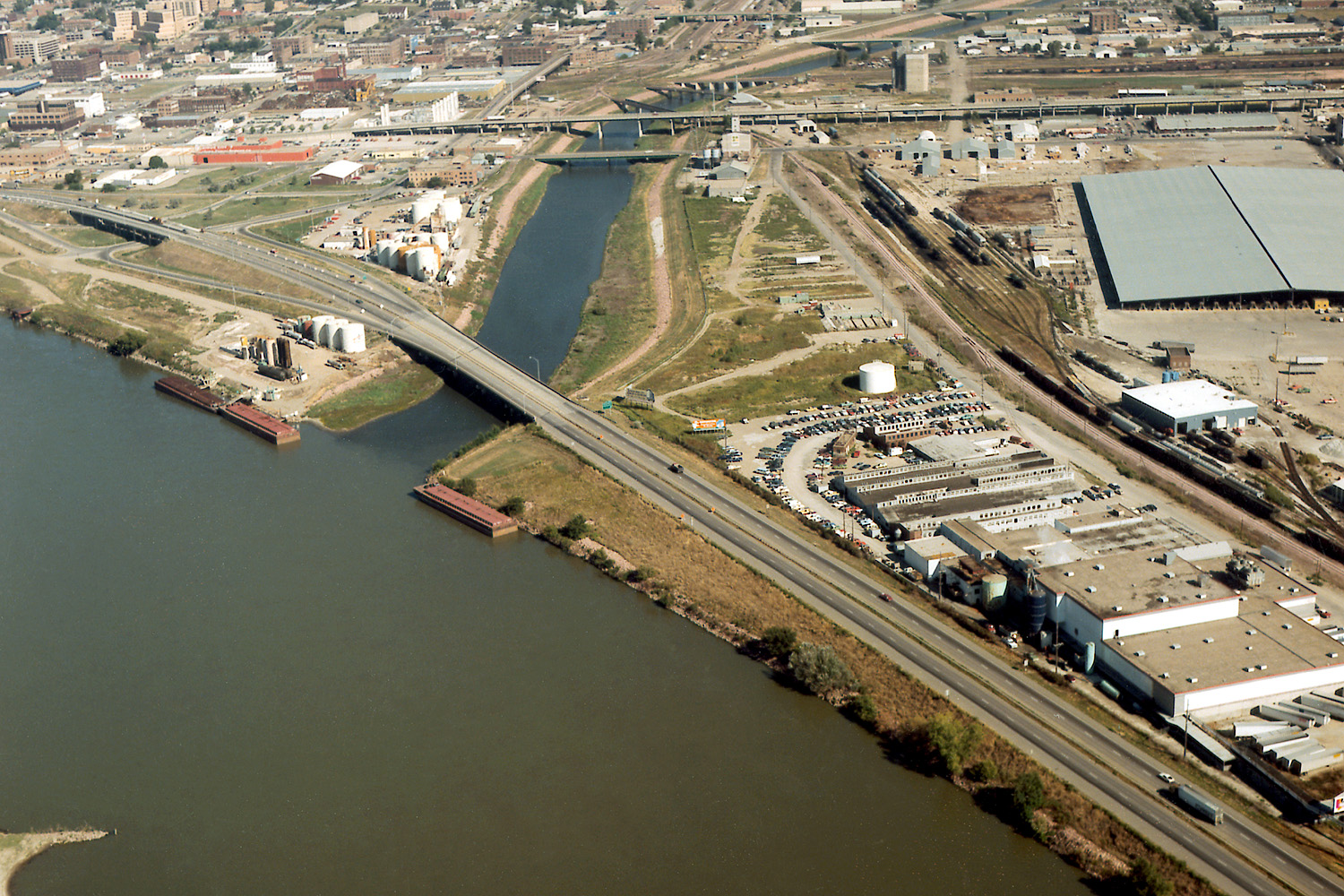
Confluence of the Missouri and Floyd Rivers in Sioux City

== See also ==
- List of Iowa rivers
