= Sioux County, Iowa =

County in Iowa, United States

- County
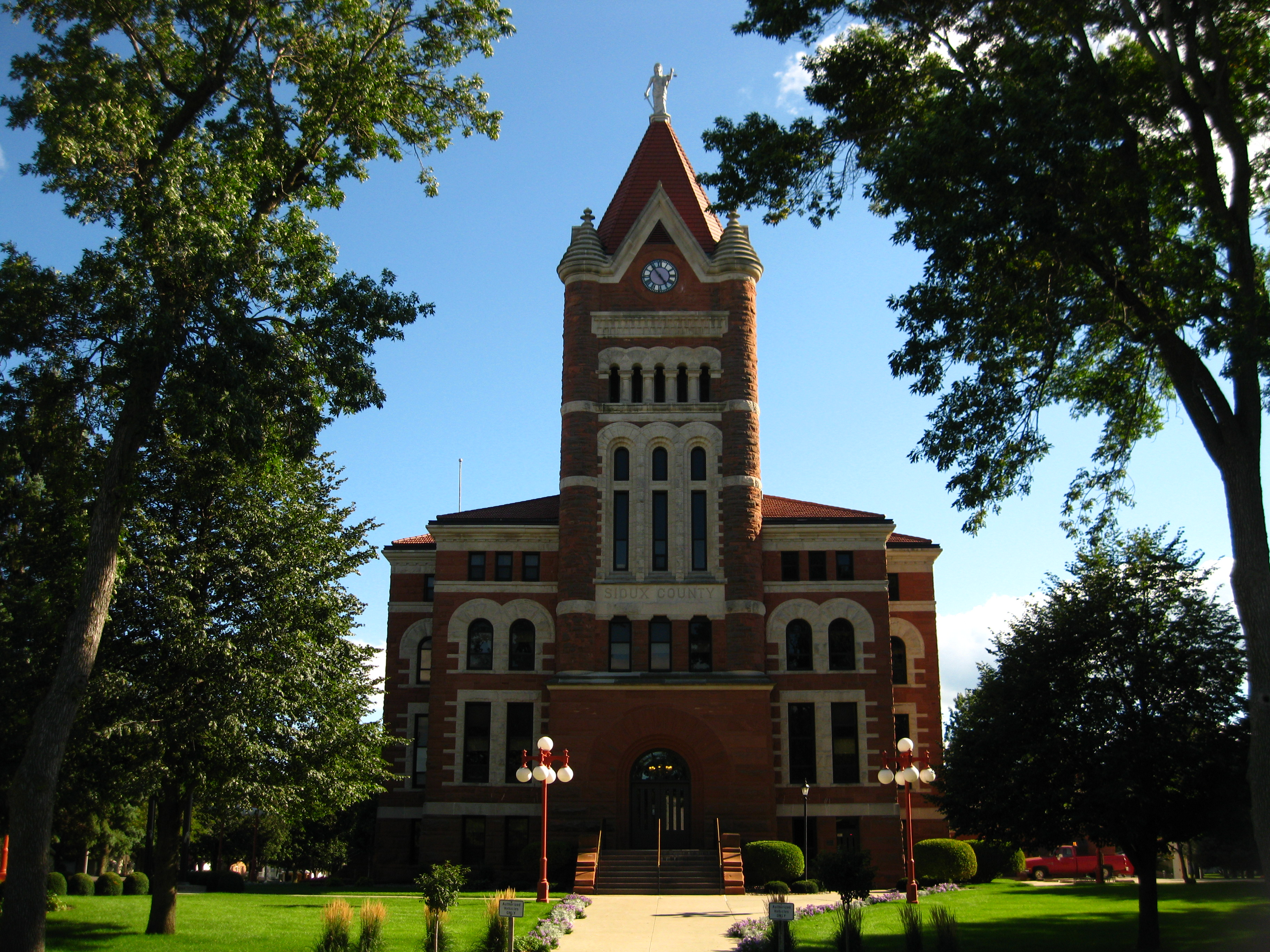
- The Sioux County Courthouse in Orange City

- Location within the U.S. state of Iowa
- Coordinates: 43.082618°N 96.177980°W
- Country: United States
- State: Iowa
- Created: January 15, 1851
- Organized: January 1, 1860
- Named for: Sioux people
- Seat: Orange City
- Largest city: Sioux Center

Area
  - Total: 768.993 sq mi (1,991.68 km^{2})
  - Land: 767.911 sq mi (1,988.88 km^{2})
  - Water: 1.082 sq mi (2.80 km^{2}) 0.14%

Population (2020)
  - Total: 35,872
  - Estimate (2025): 36,774 ▲
  - Density: 46.714/sq mi (18.036/km^{2})
- Time zone: UTC−6 (Central)
  - Summer (DST): UTC−5 (CDT)
- Area code: 712
- Congressional district: 4th
- Website: siouxcountyia.gov
- Iowa county number 84

Sioux County is a county located in the U.S. state of Iowa. As of the 2020 census, the population was 35,872. The county seat is Orange City and the largest city is Sioux Center.

== History ==
Sioux County was formed on January 15, 1851. It has been self-governed since January 20, 1860. It was named after the Sioux tribe.

The first county seat was Calliope in 1860, then a small village with 15 inhabitants, and later part of Hawarden. The first courthouse was built in 1860 and served as such until 1872. A larger immigration wave began in 1869, primarily of Dutch. In 1872, Orange City was declared the seat. In June 1902, the construction began on a new Sioux County courthouse designed by W.W. Beach. Made of red sandstone, it was completed in 1904, and still serves as the courthouse. From 1976 until 1982 the building was completely restored, and in 1977, it was listed on the National Register of Historic Places.

== Geography ==
According to the United States Census Bureau, the county has a total area of 768.993 square miles (1,991.68 km^{2}), of which 767.911 square miles (1,988.88 km^{2}) is land and 1.082 square miles (2.80 km^{2}) (0.14%) is water.

Western Sioux County drains to the southwest to the Rock River or the Big Sioux River. Eastern Sioux County drains to the south east to the Floyd River.

=== Major highways ===
- U.S. Highway 18
- U.S. Highway 75
- Iowa Highway 10
- Iowa Highway 12
- Iowa Highway 60

=== Adjacent counties ===
- Lyon County (north)
- O'Brien County (east)
- Plymouth County (south)
- Union County, South Dakota (southwest)
- Lincoln County, South Dakota (northwest)

== Demographics ==
Historical population
| Census | Pop. | Note | %± |
|---|---|---|---|
| 1860 | 10 | | — |
| 1870 | 576 | | 5,660.0% |
| 1880 | 5,426 | | 842.0% |
| 1890 | 18,370 | | 238.6% |
| 1900 | 23,337 | | 27.0% |
| 1910 | 25,248 | | 8.2% |
| 1920 | 26,458 | | 4.8% |
| 1930 | 26,806 | | 1.3% |
| 1940 | 27,209 | | 1.5% |
| 1950 | 26,381 | | −3.0% |
| 1960 | 26,375 | | 0.0% |
| 1970 | 27,996 | | 6.1% |
| 1980 | 30,813 | | 10.1% |
| 1990 | 29,903 | | −3.0% |
| 2000 | 31,589 | | 5.6% |
| 2010 | 33,704 | | 6.7% |
| 2020 | 35,872 | | 6.4% |
| 2025 (est.) | 36,774 | ▲ | 2.5% |
U.S. Decennial Census; 1790–1960 1900–1990; 1990–2000 2010–2020

Sioux County, Iowa – racial and ethnic composition Note: the US Census treats Hispanic/Latino as an ethnic category. This table excludes Latinos from the racial categories and assigns them to a separate category. Hispanics/Latinos may be of any race.
| Race / ethnicity (NH = non-Hispanic) | Pop. 1980 | Pop. 1990 | Pop. 2000 | Pop. 2010 | Pop. 2020 |
|---|---|---|---|---|---|
| White alone (NH) | 30,499 (98.98%) | 29,564 (98.87%) | 30,374 (96.15%) | 30,090 (89.28%) | 29,919 (83.40%) |
| Black or African American alone (NH) | 35 (0.11%) | 25 (0.08%) | 57 (0.18%) | 104 (0.31%) | 184 (0.51%) |
| Native American or Alaska Native alone (NH) | 60 (0.19%) | 32 (0.11%) | 37 (0.12%) | 48 (0.14%) | 87 (0.24%) |
| Asian alone (NH) | 60 (0.19%) | 204 (0.68%) | 185 (0.59%) | 264 (0.78%) | 219 (0.61%) |
| Pacific Islander alone (NH) | — | — | 3 (0.01%) | 3 (0.01%) | 5 (0.01%) |
| Other race alone (NH) | 74 (0.24%) | 12 (0.04%) | 6 (0.02%) | 4 (0.01%) | 42 (0.12%) |
| Mixed race or multiracial (NH) | — | — | 119 (0.38%) | 190 (0.56%) | 502 (1.40%) |
| Hispanic or Latino (any race) | 85 (0.28%) | 66 (0.22%) | 808 (2.56%) | 3,001 (8.90%) | 4,914 (13.70%) |
| Total | 30,813 (100.00%) | 29,903 (100.00%) | 31,589 (100.00%) | 33,704 (100.00%) | 35,872 (100.00%) |

=== 2020 census ===
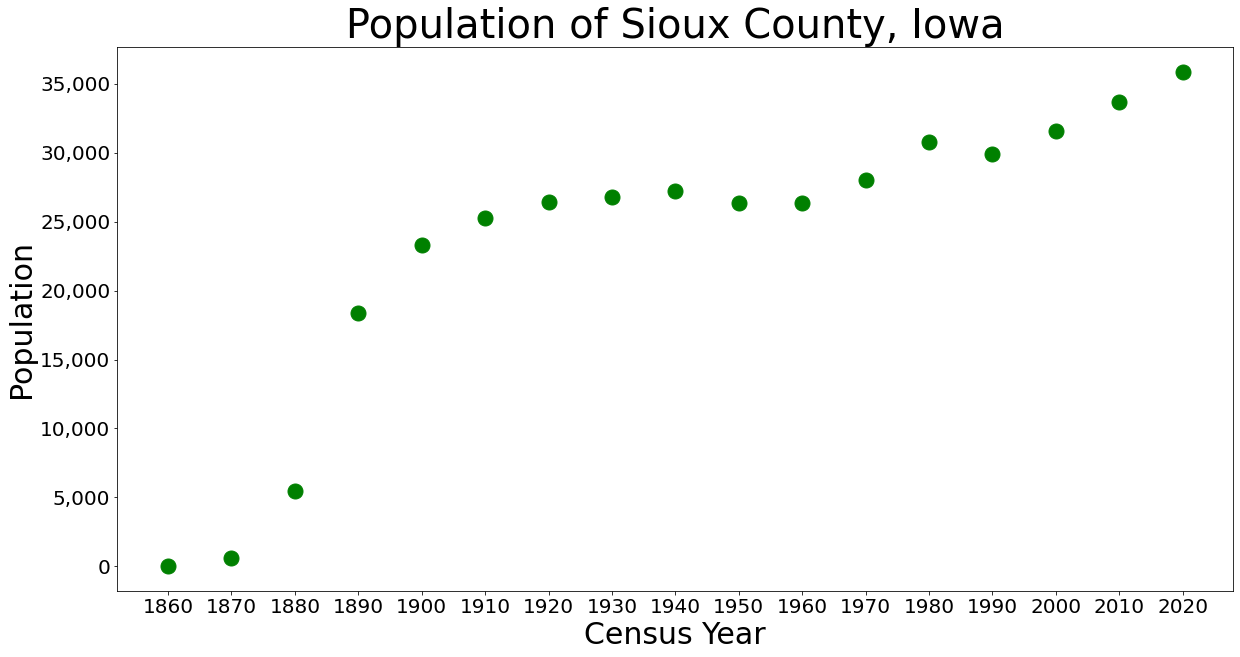
Population of Sioux County from the U.S. census data

As of the 2020 census, the county had a population of 35,872 and a population density of 46.7/sq mi (18.0/km^{2}). 93.74% of the population reported being of one race. There were 13,000 housing units, of which 12,202 were occupied, leaving a 6.1% vacancy rate; 79.6% of occupied units were owner-occupied and 20.4% were renter-occupied, with homeowner and rental vacancy rates of 1.8% and 8.6%, respectively.

The median age was 33.4 years, 27.9% of residents were under the age of 18, and 15.7% of residents were 65 years of age or older. For every 100 females there were 101.2 males, and for every 100 females age 18 and over there were 100.5 males age 18 and over.

The racial makeup of the county was 85.7% White, 0.5% Black or African American, 0.6% American Indian and Alaska Native, 0.6% Asian, <0.1% Native Hawaiian and Pacific Islander, 6.2% from some other race, and 6.3% from two or more races. Hispanic or Latino residents of any race comprised 13.7% of the population.

43.4% of residents lived in urban areas, while 56.6% lived in rural areas.

There were 12,202 households in the county, of which 35.7% had children under the age of 18 living in them. Of all households, 64.9% were married-couple households, 14.0% were households with a male householder and no spouse or partner present, and 17.9% were households with a female householder and no spouse or partner present. About 23.0% of all households were made up of individuals and 10.7% had someone living alone who was 65 years of age or older.

The most reported ancestries were Dutch (39.8%), German (19.1%), Mexican (9.8%), English (8.8%), Irish (5%), and Norwegian (2.4%).

=== 2010 census ===
As of the 2010 census recorded a population of 33,704 in the county, with a population density of 43.9/sq mi (16.9/km^{2}). There were 12,279 housing units, of which 11,584 were occupied.

=== 2000 census ===
As of the 2000 census, there were 31,589 people, 10,693 households, and 8,062 families residing in the county. The population density was 41 people per square mile (16 people/km^{2}). There were 11,260 housing units at an average density of 15 units per square mile (5.8 units/km^{2}). The racial makeup of the county was 97.33% White, 0.20% Black or African American, 0.13% Native American, 0.59% Asian, 0.01% Pacific Islander, 1.20% from other races, and 0.53% from two or more races. 2.56% of the population were Hispanic or Latino of any race.

There were 10,693 households, out of which 36.80% had children under the age of 18 living with them, 69.40% were married couples living together, 4.20% had a female householder with no husband present, and 24.60% were non-families. 22.20% of all households were made up of individuals, and 11.40% had someone living alone who was 65 years of age or older. The average household size was 2.71 and the average family size was 3.19.

In the county, the population was spread out, with 27.10% under the age of 18, 15.20% from 18 to 24, 23.50% from 25 to 44, 19.10% from 45 to 64, and 15.00% who were 65 years of age or older. The median age was 33 years. For every 100 females there were 96.30 males. For every 100 females age 18 and over, there were 93.50 males.

The median income for a household in the county was $40,536, and the median income for a family was $45,846. Males had a median income of $31,548 versus $19,963 for females. The per capita income for the county was $16,532. About 4.60% of families and 6.40% of the population were below the poverty line, including 7.90% of those under age 18 and 6.80% of those age 65 or over.

At one time divorce was relatively uncommon. In 1980, 52 married people in the county existed per divorced person; this rate did not exist in the total United States since the 1930s. As of 2011, this changed to 14 married persons per divorced person.

=== Religion ===
As of 2011, 80% of the county residents belong to major denominational churches, compared to 36% of the total U.S. population.

== Education ==
Sioux County is the home to two four-year liberal arts colleges; Northwestern College in Orange City and Dordt University in Sioux Center. Both of these schools have enrollments over 1,000. Northwest Iowa Community College is also in Sioux County, though it is most often associated with the community of Sheldon in O'Brien County.

== Politics ==
Due to its religious Dutch Reformed character, Sioux County is overwhelmingly Republican in Presidential elections. The only Democratic presidential nominee to ever carry Sioux County since the Civil War has been Franklin D. Roosevelt, who did so in 1932 and 1936; however, Theodore Roosevelt won the county as a Progressive in 1912 and George B. McClellan carried the county in the wartime 1864 election. The Democrats have only garnered 40 percent of the county's vote once since Roosevelt. It has become very Republican even by the standards of western Iowa. The Republicans have won 70 percent of the vote all but once since 1952. The only time the GOP fell below 70 percent since then was in 1964, when it was one of only seven counties in the state to support Barry Goldwater. Further underlining the county's heavy Republican bent, Goldwater easily carried the county with almost 66 percent of the vote–a near-reversal of Lyndon Johnson's statewide margin - during the same election cycle, the county was one of only two in the state (with neighboring Lyon County) not to back Democratic Governor Harold Hughes in his re-election, and with 42.8% of the vote was his weakest county as he won the state by 37 points. In addition, in 2008, when Barack Obama carried Iowa by 9.5 points, Sioux County was his weakest of all 99 counties in the state, with John McCain winning the county by 62 points. By 2020, the county at 66.5 point margin was Joe Biden's second-weakest county in Iowa, being overtaken by almost as equally Republican neighboring Lyon County at 67.5 points.

In 1992, Sioux County was one of only two counties in the nation, along with Jackson County, Kentucky, to give George H. W. Bush over seventy percent of its vote. In the six elections since then, the Republican candidates has never received less than 75 percent of the county's vote. It is located in what was, until 2013, Iowa's 5th congressional district which had a Cook Partisan Voting Index of R+9 and was represented by Republican Steve King. King won the seat in Iowa's new 4th congressional district in the 2012 election with 53% of the district's vote, and with 83% of Sioux County votes going for King.

United States presidential election results for Sioux County, Iowa
| Year | Republican | | Democratic | | Third party(ies) | |
| Year | No. | % | No. | % | No. | % |
|---|---|---|---|---|---|---|
| 1896 | 2,841 | 59.02% | 1,898 | 39.43% | 75 | 1.56% |
| 1900 | 3,025 | 61.70% | 1,809 | 36.90% | 69 | 1.41% |
| 1904 | 2,992 | 70.83% | 1,151 | 27.25% | 81 | 1.92% |
| 1908 | 2,697 | 58.10% | 1,891 | 40.74% | 54 | 1.16% |
| 1912 | 575 | 12.33% | 1,453 | 31.15% | 2,636 | 56.52% |
| 1916 | 2,261 | 51.89% | 2,049 | 47.03% | 47 | 1.08% |
| 1920 | 6,068 | 79.29% | 1,510 | 19.73% | 75 | 0.98% |
| 1924 | 4,960 | 58.91% | 900 | 10.69% | 2,560 | 30.40% |
| 1928 | 6,378 | 68.97% | 2,839 | 30.70% | 31 | 0.34% |
| 1932 | 3,943 | 38.65% | 6,170 | 60.48% | 89 | 0.87% |
| 1936 | 4,543 | 42.58% | 5,553 | 52.05% | 573 | 5.37% |
| 1940 | 7,585 | 64.55% | 4,144 | 35.27% | 21 | 0.18% |
| 1944 | 6,552 | 65.92% | 3,369 | 33.89% | 19 | 0.19% |
| 1948 | 5,597 | 57.11% | 4,042 | 41.24% | 162 | 1.65% |
| 1952 | 10,275 | 83.21% | 2,050 | 16.60% | 24 | 0.19% |
| 1956 | 9,651 | 78.29% | 2,666 | 21.63% | 11 | 0.09% |
| 1960 | 10,284 | 79.51% | 2,643 | 20.43% | 7 | 0.05% |
| 1964 | 8,078 | 65.55% | 4,233 | 34.35% | 12 | 0.10% |
| 1968 | 10,010 | 80.04% | 2,181 | 17.44% | 316 | 2.53% |
| 1972 | 10,721 | 78.27% | 2,867 | 20.93% | 109 | 0.80% |
| 1976 | 9,448 | 73.04% | 3,322 | 25.68% | 165 | 1.28% |
| 1980 | 10,768 | 76.01% | 2,698 | 19.04% | 701 | 4.95% |
| 1984 | 11,665 | 81.61% | 2,585 | 18.09% | 43 | 0.30% |
| 1988 | 10,270 | 77.29% | 2,923 | 22.00% | 95 | 0.71% |
| 1992 | 10,637 | 72.21% | 2,226 | 15.11% | 1,867 | 12.67% |
| 1996 | 10,864 | 77.00% | 2,392 | 16.95% | 854 | 6.05% |
| 2000 | 12,241 | 83.32% | 2,148 | 14.62% | 303 | 2.06% |
| 2004 | 14,229 | 85.87% | 2,259 | 13.63% | 82 | 0.49% |
| 2008 | 13,490 | 80.95% | 3,030 | 18.18% | 145 | 0.87% |
| 2012 | 14,407 | 83.24% | 2,700 | 15.60% | 201 | 1.16% |
| 2016 | 14,785 | 81.26% | 2,300 | 12.64% | 1,109 | 6.10% |
| 2020 | 15,680 | 82.31% | 3,019 | 15.85% | 352 | 1.85% |
| 2024 | 16,053 | 84.49% | 2,626 | 13.82% | 322 | 1.69% |

== Communities ==
=== Cities ===
- Alton
- Boyden
- Chatsworth
- Granville
- Hawarden
- Hospers
- Hull
- Ireton
- Matlock
- Maurice
- Orange City
- Rock Valley
- Sheldon
- Sioux Center

=== Townships ===
- Buncombe
- Capel
- Center
- Eagle
- East Orange
- Floyd
- Garfield
- Grant
- Holland
- Lincoln
- Logan
- Lynn
- Nassau
- Plato
- Reading
- Rock
- Settlers
- Sheridan
- Sherman
- Sioux
- Washington
- Welcome
- West Branch

=== Population ranking ===
The population ranking of the following table is based on the 2020 census of Sioux County.

† county seat

| Rank | City/Town/etc. | Municipal type | Population (2020 Census) |
|---|---|---|---|
| 1 | Sioux Center | City | 8,229 |
| 2 | † Orange City | City | 6,267 |
| 3 | Rock Valley | City | 4,059 |
| 4 | Hawarden | City | 2,700 |
| 5 | Hull | City | 2,384 |
| 6 | Alton | City | 1,248 |
| 7 | Hospers | City | 718 |
| 8 | Boyden | City | 701 |
| 9 | Ireton | City | 590 |
| 10 | Granville | City | 310 |
| 11 | Maurice | City | 265 |
| 12 | Sheldon (mostly in O'Brien) | City | 261 (5,512 total) |
| 13 | Chatsworth | City | 75 |
| 14 | Matlock | City | 74 |

== Notable people ==
- Vern Den Herder, member of the undefeated Miami Dolphins NFL team of 1972
- Hope Emerson, American actress
- Michael Franken, retired U.S. Navy Vice Admiral, won Iowa's 2022 U.S. Senate Democratic Primary
- Stanley L. Greigg, member of the U.S. House of Representatives
- Brian Hansen, former NFL punter
- Charles B. Hoeven, U.S. Representative
- Millie Jeffrey, pioneer for workers', civil and women's rights
- James Kennedy, American historian
- Stephen Mitchell
- Nancy Metcalf, professional volleyball player
- Albert Meyer
- Dennis A. Muilenburg, Former Boeing President & CEO
- Dennis Marion Schnurr, Archbishop of the Roman Catholic Archdiocese of Cincinnati
- Robert H. Schuller, American televangelist, pastor, and author
- Ruth Suckow, American author
- Melvin D. Synhorst, former Iowa Secretary of State
- Delwin Vriend, LGBT rights icon
- Anna Johnson Pell Wheeler, American mathematician
- Adam Gregg, Current Iowa Lieutenant Governor

== See also ==
- National Register of Historic Places listings in Sioux County, Iowa
