= Orange City, Iowa =

- City
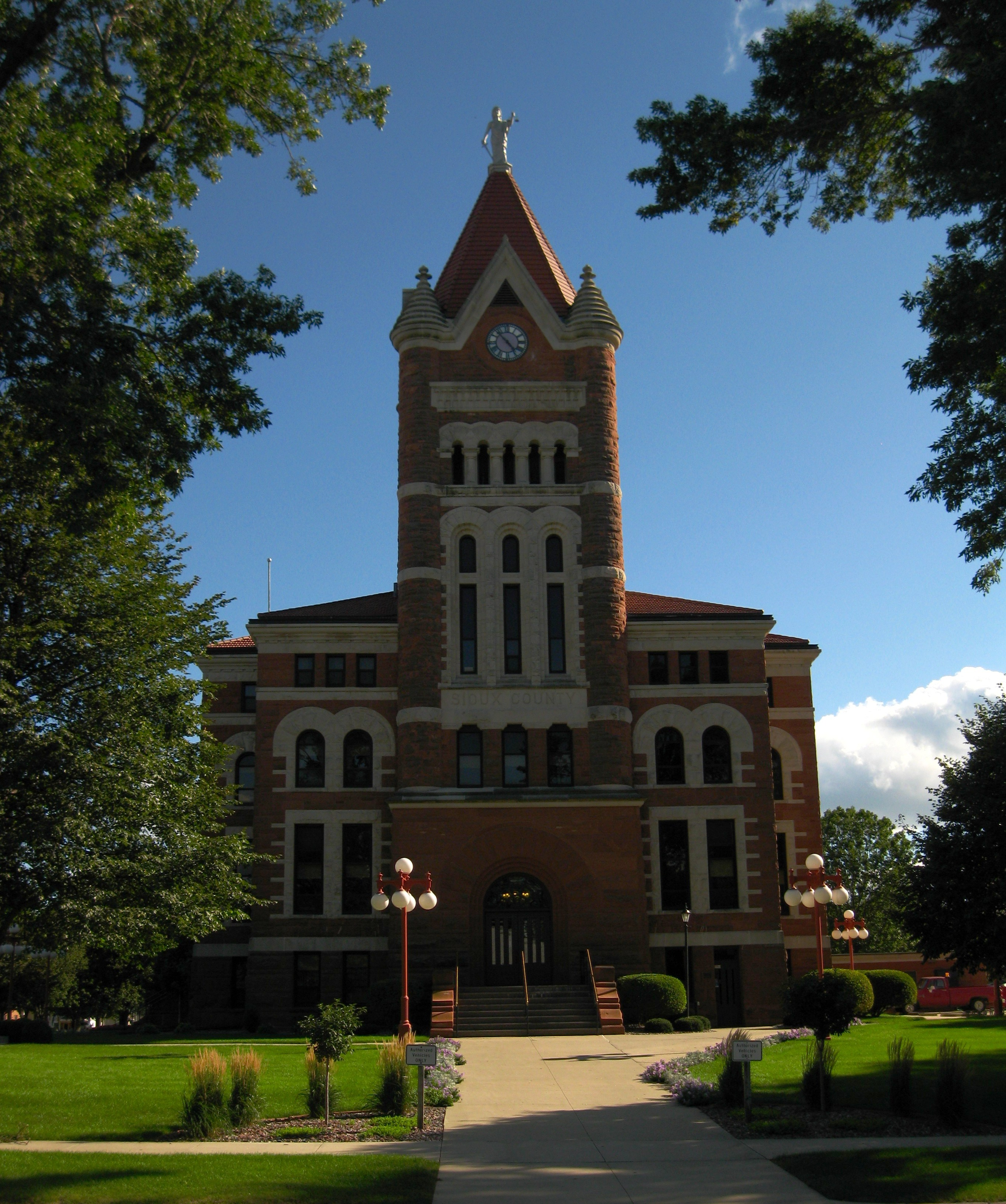
- Sioux County Courthouse in Orange City

- Location of Orange City, Iowa

- Location in the United States
- Coordinates: 42°59′45″N 96°03′17″W
- Country: United States
- State: Iowa
- County: Sioux
- Incorporated: February 29, 1884

Government
  - Type: Mayor-council

Area
  - Total: 4.33 sq mi (11.21 km^{2})
  - Land: 4.33 sq mi (11.21 km^{2})
  - Water: 0 sq mi (0.00 km^{2})
- Elevation: 1,414 ft (431 m)

Population (2020)
  - Total: 6,267
  - Density: 1,447.3/sq mi (558.82/km^{2})
- Time zone: UTC-6 (Central (CST))
  - Summer (DST): UTC-5 (CDT)
- ZIP code: 51041
- Area code: 712
- FIPS code: 19-59475
- GNIS feature ID: 2396072
- Website: orangecityiowa.com

Orange City is a city in, and the county seat of, Sioux County, Iowa, United States. Its population was 6,267 in the 2020 census, an increase from 5,582 in 2000. Named after William of Orange, the community maintains its Dutch settler traditions visibly, with Dutch storefront architecture and an annual Tulip Festival.

== History and culture ==
Orange City was first called Holland and was later renamed in honor of Dutch royalty, the Prince of Orange. The city was founded in 1870 by settlers from Pella, Iowa, who were looking for cheaper and better land.

As the county seat of Sioux County, the city is the location of the Sioux County Courthouse, which is listed on the National Register of Historic Places.

== Geography ==
According to the United States Census Bureau, the city has a total area of 3.94 sq mi (10.20 km^{2}), all land.

== Demographics ==
Historical population
Census	Pop.	Note	%±
1880	320		—
1890	1,246		289.4%
1900	1,457		16.9%
1910	1,374		−5.7%
1920	1,632		18.8%
1930	1,727		5.8%
1940	1,920		11.2%
1950	2,166		12.8%
1960	2,707		25.0%
1970	3,572		32.0%
1980	4,588		28.4%
1990	4,940		7.7%
2000	5,582		13.0%
2010	6,004		7.6%
2020	6,267		4.4%
U.S. Decennial Census

=== 2020 census ===
As of the 2020 census, Orange City had a population of 6,267, with 2,095 households and 1,479 families residing in the city. The population density was 1,447.3 inhabitants per square mile (558.8/km^{2}), and there were 2,209 housing units at an average density of 510.2 per square mile (197.0/km^{2}).

The median age was 31.2 years. 22.7% of residents were under the age of 18. 29.7% of residents were under the age of 20, 13.4% were between the ages of 20 and 24, 20.5% were from 25 to 44, 19.8% were from 45 to 64, and 16.5% were 65 years of age or older. The gender makeup of the city was 48.2% male and 51.8% female. For every 100 females there were 93.0 males, and for every 100 females age 18 and over there were 92.5 males age 18 and over.

95.5% of residents lived in urban areas, while 4.5% lived in rural areas.

Of households, 31.4% had children under the age of 18 living in them. Of all households, 62.4% were married-couple households, 2.6% were cohabiting-couple households, 13.3% were households with a male householder and no spouse or partner present, and 21.7% were households with a female householder and no spouse or partner present. Non-family households accounted for 29.4% of all households. About 26.2% of all households were made up of individuals, and 10.4% had someone living alone who was 65 years of age or older.

Of housing units, 5.2% were vacant. The homeowner vacancy rate was 1.4%, and the rental vacancy rate was 7.8%.

Racial composition as of the 2020 census
Race	Number	Percent
White	5,544	88.5%
Black or African American	39	0.6%
American Indian and Alaska Native	45	0.7%
Asian	77	1.2%
Native Hawaiian and Other Pacific Islander	0	0.0%
Some other race	178	2.8%
Two or more races	384	6.1%
Hispanic or Latino (of any race)	618	9.9%

=== 2010 census ===
As of the census of 2010, 6,004 people, 1,905 households, and 1,405 families were living in the city. The population density was 1,523.9/sq mi (588.4/km^{2}). The 2,004 housing units had an average density of 508.6/sq mi (196.4/km^{2}). The racial makeup of the city was 93.2% White, 0.6% African American, 0.3% Native American, 1.4% Asian, 3.4% from other races, and 1.0% from two or more races. Hispanics or Latinos of any race were 7.0% of the population.

Of the 1,905 households, 33.8% had children under 18 living with them, 67.0% were married couples living together, 4.7% had a female householder with no husband present, 2.0% had a male householder with no wife present, and 26.2% were not families. About 23.5% of all households were made up of individuals, and 10.5% had someone living alone who was 65 or older. The average household size was 2.61, and the average family size was 3.08.

The median age in the city was 29.1 years; 23.1% of residents were under 18, 22.2% were between 18 and 24, 19.3% were from 25 to 44, 20.7% were from 45 to 64, and 14.7% were 65 or older. The gender makeup of the city was 47.3% male and 52.7% female.

=== 2000 census ===
As of the census of 2000, 5,582 people, 1,719 households, and 1,285 families were living in the city. The population density was 1,808.5 people/sq mi (697.5/km^{2}). The 1,805 housing units had an average density of 584.8/sq mi (225.5/km^{2}). The racial makeup of the city was 97.51% White, 0.50% African American, 0.05% Native American, 0.97% Asian, 0.61% from other races, and 0.36% from two or more races. Hispanics or Latino of any race were 1.13% of the population.

There were 1,719 households, out of which 35.8% had children under the age of 18 living with them, 69.8% were married couples living together, 4.0% had a female householder with no husband present, and 25.2% were not families. About 23.9% of all households were made up of individuals, and 10.8% had someone living alone who was 65 or older. The average household size was 2.58, and the average family size was 3.07.

In the city, the age distribution was 22.7% under 18, 24.9% from 18 to 24, 20.2% from 25 to 44, 16.3% from 45 to 64, and 15.9% who were 65 or older. The median age was 28 years. For every 100 females, there were 85.7 males. For every 100 females 18 and over, there were 80.6 males.

The median income for a household in the city was $39,721, and for a family was $49,076. Males had a median income of $33,965 versus $21,130 for females. The per capita income for the city was $17,413. About 4.4% of families and 4.8% of the population were below the poverty line, including 3.8% of those under age 18 and 10.7% of those age 65 or over.

== Economy ==
Major companies headquartered in Orange City include Diamond Vogel, Pizza Ranch, and Revival Animal Health Systems.

Employers in Orange City are:

- Diamond Vogel and Old Masters – >800 employees
- Orange City Area Health System – 500 employees
- Staples Promotional Products – 400 employees
- Northwestern College – 300 employees
- Revival Animal Health – 70 employees between its Orange City and Mapleton, Iowa facilities
- CIVCO (Radiation Oncology division) – 270 employees worldwide
- EZ-Liner – 50 employees
- Silent Drive – 40 employees
- Pizza Ranch – 30 office staff
- SEKISUI Aerospace – 160 employees
- Van Beek Natural Science – 25 employees

== Education ==
MOC-Floyd Valley Community School District is the local school district. The district formed on July 1, 1994, with the merger of the Maurice-Orange City and Floyd Valley districts. Public schools serving the community are Orange City Elementary School, MOC-Floyd Valley Middle School in Alton, and MOC-Floyd Valley High School in Orange City. The current Orange City Elementary building opened in the early 1920s, but a new one will enter use in the 2023–2024 school year.

Private schools include Orange City Christian School, and Unity Christian High School in the War Eagle Conference.

Orange City is home to Northwestern College, a Christian liberal arts college affiliated with the Reformed Church in America. As of August 2011, 1,243 students were enrolled – 59% female and 41% male.

It is also within 30 miles of Northwest Iowa Community College in Sheldon, which was started in 1966 as a pilot program sponsored by the Department of Education in cooperation with the local high schools. It enrolls over 1,000 students per year (58% female, 42% male as of 2005).

== Religion ==
Orange City is traditionally a Dutch Reformed community with several congregations from the Christian Reformed Church of North America, United Reformed Churches in North America, and Reformed Church in America denominations. The city also has congregations from the Lutheran Church–Missouri Synod, Southern Baptist Convention, Presbyterian Church in America, Episcopal, Christian and Missionary Alliance, and Evangelical Free Church of America denominations. A Catholic church is located in Alton, Iowa, 3 miles east of Orange City.

== Notable people ==
- Nick Collison (born 1980) Former NBA power forward for the Oklahoma City Thunder (2003–2018)
- Jordan De Jong (born 1979) is a former MLB pitcher for the Toronto Blue Jays (2007).
- Howard Heemstra (1928–2011), architect, professor of architecture born in Orange City.
- Terry L. Huitink (1951–2014), judge of the Iowa Court of Appeals, was born in Orange City.
- Tyler James (born 1982) is a singer/songwriter.
- James Kennedy (born 1963) is an American historian.
- Dennis Muilenburg (born 1964) is a former president and CEO of The Boeing Company.
- Tyler Mulder (born 1987) is a track and field athlete for the Oregon Track Club.
- Kenneth Veenstra, an Iowa state legislator and businessman
- Cora Vander Broek (born 1977) is a Tony Award-nominated actress.
