= Alton, Iowa =

- City
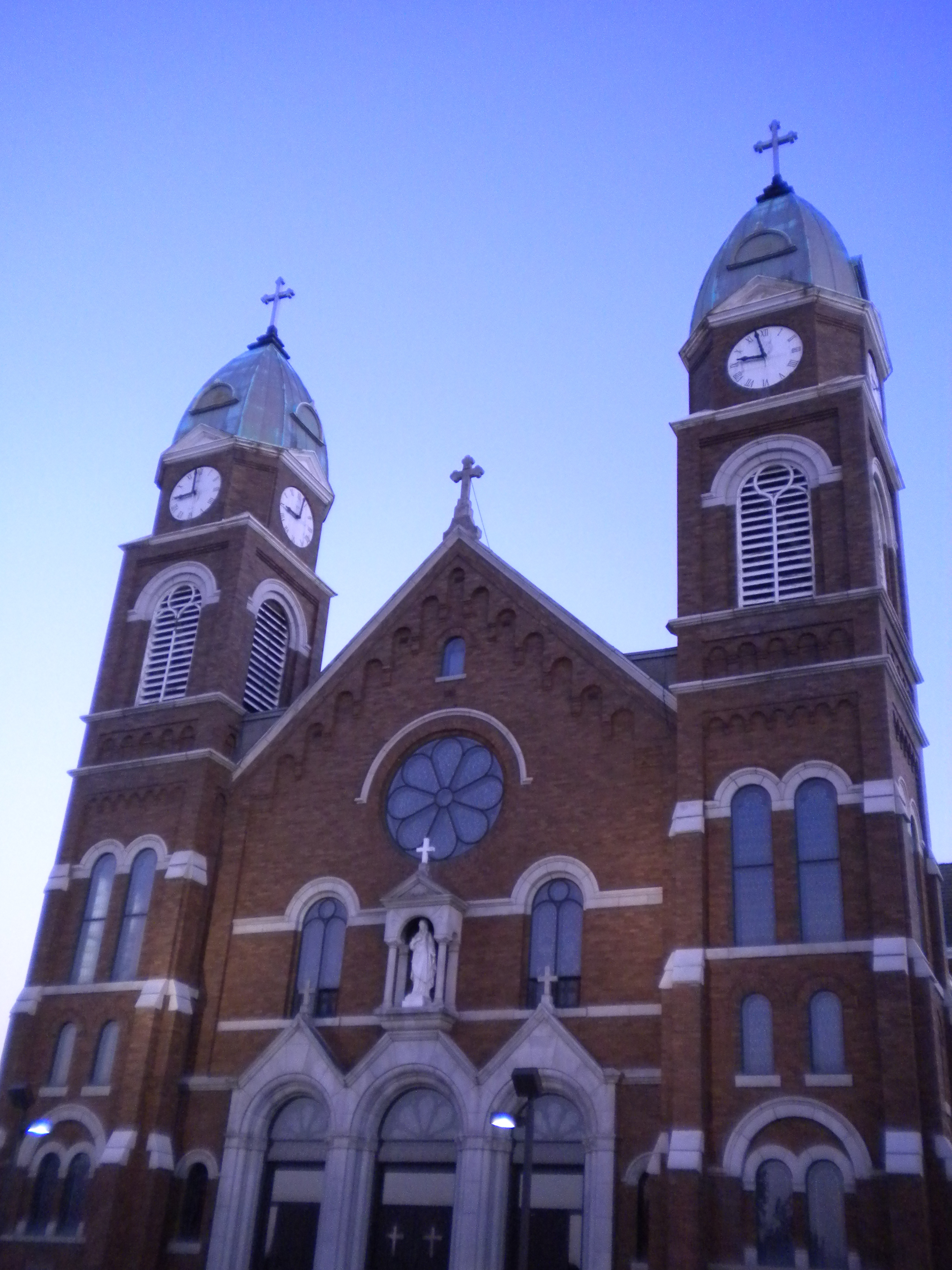
- St. Mary's Catholic Church

- Location of Alton, Iowa
- Coordinates: 42°59′36″N 96°0′21″W
- Country: United States
- State: Iowa
- County: Sioux
- Incorporated: March 8, 1883

Area
  - Total: 1.90 sq mi (4.93 km^{2})
  - Land: 1.90 sq mi (4.93 km^{2})
  - Water: 0 sq mi (0.00 km^{2})
- Elevation: 1,316 ft (401 m)

Population (2020)
  - Total: 1,248
  - Density: 656.1/sq mi (253.33/km^{2})
- Time zone: UTC-6 (Central (CST))
  - Summer (DST): UTC-5 (CDT)
- ZIP code: 51003
- Area code: 712
- FIPS code: 19-01585
- GNIS feature ID: 2393936
- Website: City of Alton

Alton is a city in Sioux County, Iowa, United States, along the Floyd River. The population was 1,248 at the 2020 census.

== History ==
Alton was originally called East Orange, and under the latter name was laid out in 1875 when the railroad was extended to that point. East Orange was renamed Alton in 1882. Alton was incorporated as a city in 1883.

== Geography ==
According to the United States Census Bureau, the city has a total area of 1.85 square miles (4.79 km^{2}), all land.

== Demographics ==
Historical populations
Year	Pop.	±%
1890	708	—
1900	1,009	+42.5%
1910	1,046	+3.7%
1920	1,007	−3.7%
1930	1,014	+0.7%
1940	1,025	+1.1%
1950	1,038	+1.3%
1960	1,048	+1.0%
1970	1,018	−2.9%
1980	986	−3.1%
1990	1,063	+7.8%
2000	1,095	+3.0%
2010	1,216	+11.1%
2020	1,248	+2.6%
Source:"U.S. Census website". United States Census Bureau. and Iowa Data Center; Source: U.S. Decennial Census

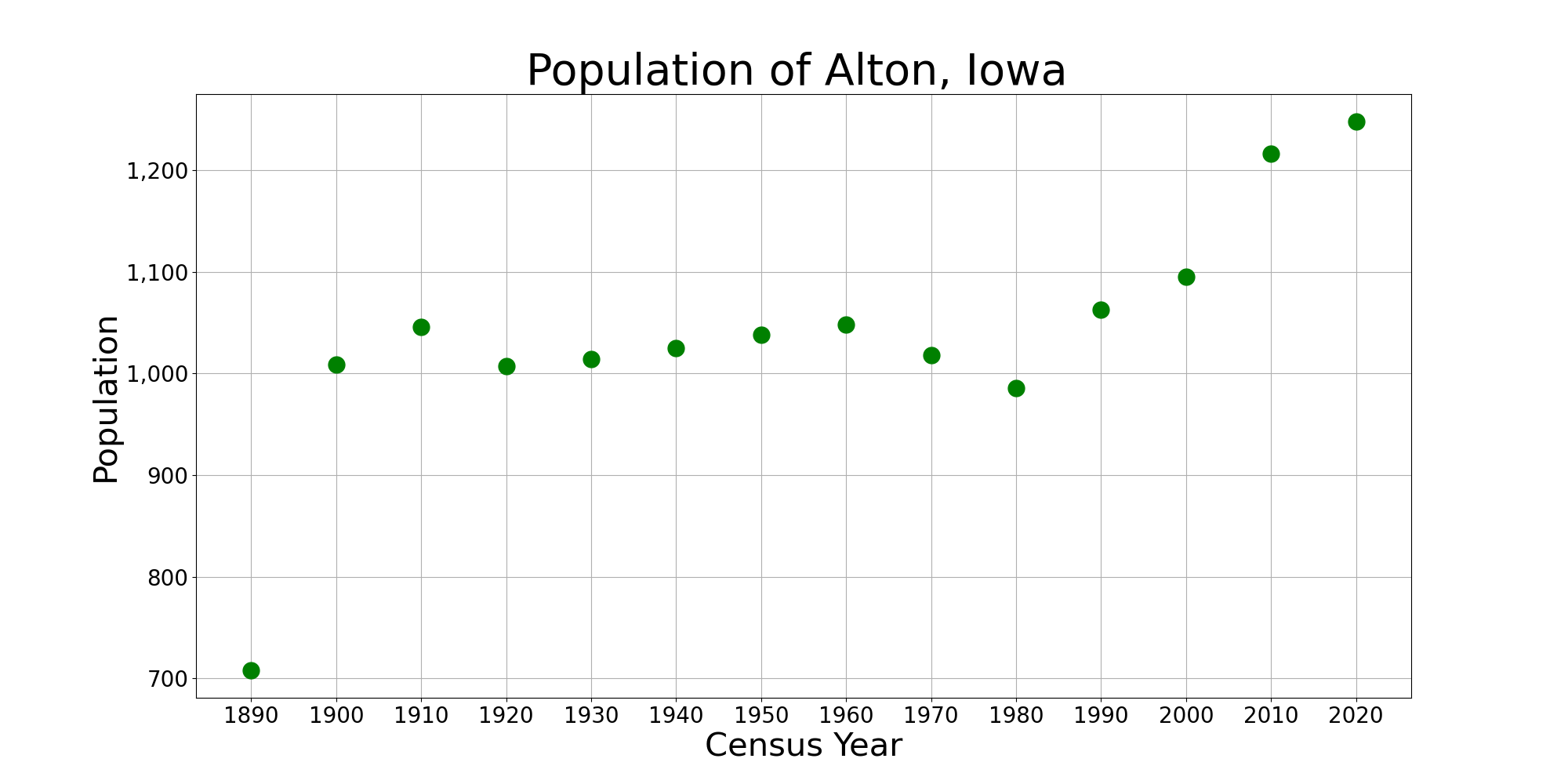
The population of Alton, Iowa from US census data

=== 2020 census ===
As of the 2020 census, there were 1,248 people, 477 households, and 338 families residing in the city. The population density was 656.1 inhabitants per square mile (253.3/km^{2}), and there were 526 housing units at an average density of 276.5 per square mile (106.8/km^{2}). The median age was 37.0 years; 27.7% of residents were under the age of 18, and 15.5% were 65 years of age or older. Age distribution was 29.8% under the age of 20, 4.9% from 20 to 24, 25.7% from 25 to 44, 24.0% from 45 to 64, and 15.5% age 65 or older. For every 100 females there were 103.6 males, and for every 100 females age 18 and over there were 107.4 males age 18 and over.

87.7% of residents lived in urban areas, while 12.3% lived in rural areas.

Of the 477 households, 32.9% had children under the age of 18 living with them, 62.9% were married-couple households, 3.6% were cohabitating couples, 17.6% were households with a male householder and no spouse or partner present, and 15.9% were households with a female householder and no spouse or partner present. 29.1% of all households were non-families, 26.2% of all households were made up of individuals, and 10.1% had someone living alone who was 65 years of age or older.

Of the 526 housing units, 9.3% were vacant. The homeowner vacancy rate was 2.7% and the rental vacancy rate was 7.6%.

Racial composition as of the 2020 census
Race	Number	Percent
White	1,110	88.9%
Black or African American	24	1.9%
American Indian and Alaska Native	10	0.8%
Asian	6	0.5%
Native Hawaiian and Other Pacific Islander	5	0.4%
Some other race	34	2.7%
Two or more races	59	4.7%
Hispanic or Latino (of any race)	81	6.5%

=== 2010 census ===
As of the census of 2010, there were 1,216 people, 478 households, and 338 families living in the city. The population density was 657.3 inhabitants per square mile (253.8/km^{2}). There were 493 housing units at an average density of 266.5 per square mile (102.9/km^{2}). The racial makeup of the city was 95.9% White, 0.7% African American, 0.3% Native American, 0.7% Asian, 1.6% from other races, and 0.8% from two or more races. Hispanic or Latino of any race were 4.7% of the population.

There were 478 households, of which 33.9% had children under the age of 18 living with them, 63.6% were married couples living together, 4.4% had a female householder with no husband present, 2.7% had a male householder with no wife present, and 29.3% were non-families. 24.9% of all households were made up of individuals, and 12.1% had someone living alone who was 65 years of age or older. The average household size was 2.54 and the average family size was 3.07.

The median age in the city was 36.6 years. 27.1% of residents were under the age of 18; 7.5% were between the ages of 18 and 24; 23.2% were from 25 to 44; 28.3% were from 45 to 64; and 13.7% were 65 years of age or older. The gender makeup of the city was 49.5% male and 50.5% female.

=== 2000 census ===
As of the census of 2000, there were 1,095 people, 439 households, and 297 families living in the city. The population density was 735.3 inhabitants per square mile (283.9/km^{2}). There were 466 housing units at an average density of 312.9 per square mile (120.8/km^{2}). The racial makeup of the city was 99.54% White, 0.09% Native American, 0.09% from other races, and 0.27% from two or more races. Hispanic or Latino of any race were 1.10% of the population.

There were 439 households, out of which 32.3% had children under the age of 18 living with them, 61.3% were married couples living together, 4.1% had a female householder with no husband present, and 32.3% were non-families. 30.1% of all households were made up of individuals, and 15.7% had someone living alone who was 65 years of age or older. The average household size was 2.49 and the average family size was 3.14.

In the city, the population was spread out, with 27.4% under the age of 18, 10.5% from 18 to 24, 26.4% from 25 to 44, 19.8% from 45 to 64, and 15.9% who were 65 years of age or older. The median age was 38 years. For every 100 females, there were 95.5 males. For every 100 females age 18 and over, there were 99.7 males.

The median income for a household in the city was $39,911, and the median income for a family was $47,143. Males had a median income of $30,500 versus $19,570 for females. The per capita income for the city was $16,663. About 4.0% of families and 4.2% of the population were below the poverty line, including 2.4% of those under age 18 and 11.3% of those age 65 or over.

== Education ==
MOC-Floyd Valley Community School District is the local school district. The district formed on July 1, 1994 with the merger of the Maurice-Orange City and Floyd Valley districts. Alton houses the district's middle school while elementary and high schools are in Orange City.

Spalding Catholic School, which serves elementary grades, is located in a single campus in Alton. It was previously a K-8 school and had multiple campuses, with middle school in Granville, but the Granville campus closed in 2017, and middle school students are now attending Gehlen Catholic School in LeMars. The associated Spalding Catholic High closed in 2013 with students merged into Gehlen Catholic High School.

== Notable people ==
- James T. Klein, member of the Iowa House of Representatives
- Robert Schuller, pastor of the Crystal Cathedral, was born and raised a few miles outside of Alton.
