= Gehlen Catholic School =

Private school in Le Mars, Iowa, United States

Location
- 709 Plymouth State NE; Le Mars, Iowa; Le Mars, (Plymouth County), Iowa 51031; United States
- Coordinates: 42°47′36″N 96°9′20″W

Information
- Type: Private, Coeducational
- Motto: Excellence in Education. Leadership through Christ.
- Religious affiliation: Roman Catholic
- Established: 1953
- Founder: Peter Gehlen
- Status: Open
- Superintendent: Patty Lansink
- President: Father Doug Klein
- Principal: Bryan Paulson
- Grades: Preschool–12
- Hours in school day: 7
- Campus: Rural
- Colors: Green and Gold
- Fight song: Minnesota Rouser
- Athletics: Football, Volleyball, Cross Country, Basketball, Track & Field, Golf, Baseball, Softball
- Athletics conference: War Eagle Conference
- Mascot: Jaybird
- Team name: Jays
- Newspaper: Gehlen-Aire
- Yearbook: Rosarian
- Alumni: Paul Rust
- Athletic Director: Jeff Kramer
- Website: http://www.gehlencatholic.org

Gehlen Catholic School is a PreK-12 Roman Catholic school located in LeMars, Iowa. Gehlen's athletic teams are known as the Jays. They compete in the War Eagle Conference with eight other teams from northwest Iowa. Their main rival is the other Roman Catholic school in the War Eagle, Remsen St. Mary's High School. Gehlen is located in the Roman Catholic Diocese of Sioux City.

== History ==
On May 29, 1952, construction began, and the school's first graduation was held on May 29, 1954. It was named after Peter Gehlen, one of the first Catholic residents of LeMars, Iowa.

Spalding Catholic High School merged with Gehlen's high school at the start of the 2013–14 school year. As separate programs, Spalding and Gehlen earned nine Iowa High School Athletic Association baseball championships total.

In 2017 Spalding Catholic closed its middle school, and those students were redirected to Gehlen.

== Athletics ==
The Jays compete in the following sports in the War Eagle Conference:

- Cross Country
  - Girls' 1986 Class 1A State Champions
- Volleyball
- Football
  - 1995 Class A State Champions
- Basketball
- Wrestling
- Track and Field
  - Boys' 2-time State Champions (1989, 1996)
  - Girls' 3-time Class 1A State Champions (1983, 1994, 2003)
- Golf
  - Boys' 1998 Class 1A State Champions
- Soccer
- Baseball
  - 2-time Class 1A State Champions (1995, 1999)
- Softball

== See also ==
- List of high schools in Iowa
