= Alons =

Alons is a surname. Notable people with the surname include:

- Dwayne Alons (1946–2014), American politician who served in the Iowa House of Representatives
- Kevin Alons (born 1968), American politician elected to the Iowa Senate, son of Dwayne

== See also ==
- Alon (name)
