= Kooiker =

Kooiker is a nickname for the Kooikerhondje, a dog breed, and a surname. Notable people with the surname include:

- John Kooiker (born 1946), American politician, father of Sam
- Leonie Kooiker (1927–2020), Dutch author of children's books
- Paul Kooiker (born 1964), Dutch photographer
- Sam Kooiker (born 1974), American politician, son of John
