= McFetridge =

McFetridge, MacFetridge, and the variant spelling McFatridge, are surnames, anglicized forms of Scottish Gaelic Mac Pheadruis, patronymic from a Gaelic form of the given name Peter. Notable people with the surnames include:

- Charles MacFetridge, Irish Archdeacon of Ross from 1904 until 1925
- Charles McFatridge (1871–1949), American politician
- Duncan McFetridge (born 1952), Australian politician
- Edward C. McFetridge (1836–1914), American politician
- Jack McFetridge (1869–1917), American baseball player
- Katherine McFetridge (born 1989), American rower
- Olcan McFetridge (born 1963), Irish hurler
- Peter McFetridge (born 1986), Canadian lacrosse player
- William McFatridge, American politician
- William McFetridge (1893–1969), American labor leader
