= Leonard Scott =

Leonard Scott may refer to:

- Leonard Scott (sprinter), American sprinter
- Leonard Scott (musician), American gospel musician and pastor
- Leonard E. Scott, member of the Iowa House of Representatives

== See also ==
- Robert Leonard Ewing Scott, American convicted murderer, also known as L. Ewing Scott
