= Skyler Wheeler =

American politician (born 1993)

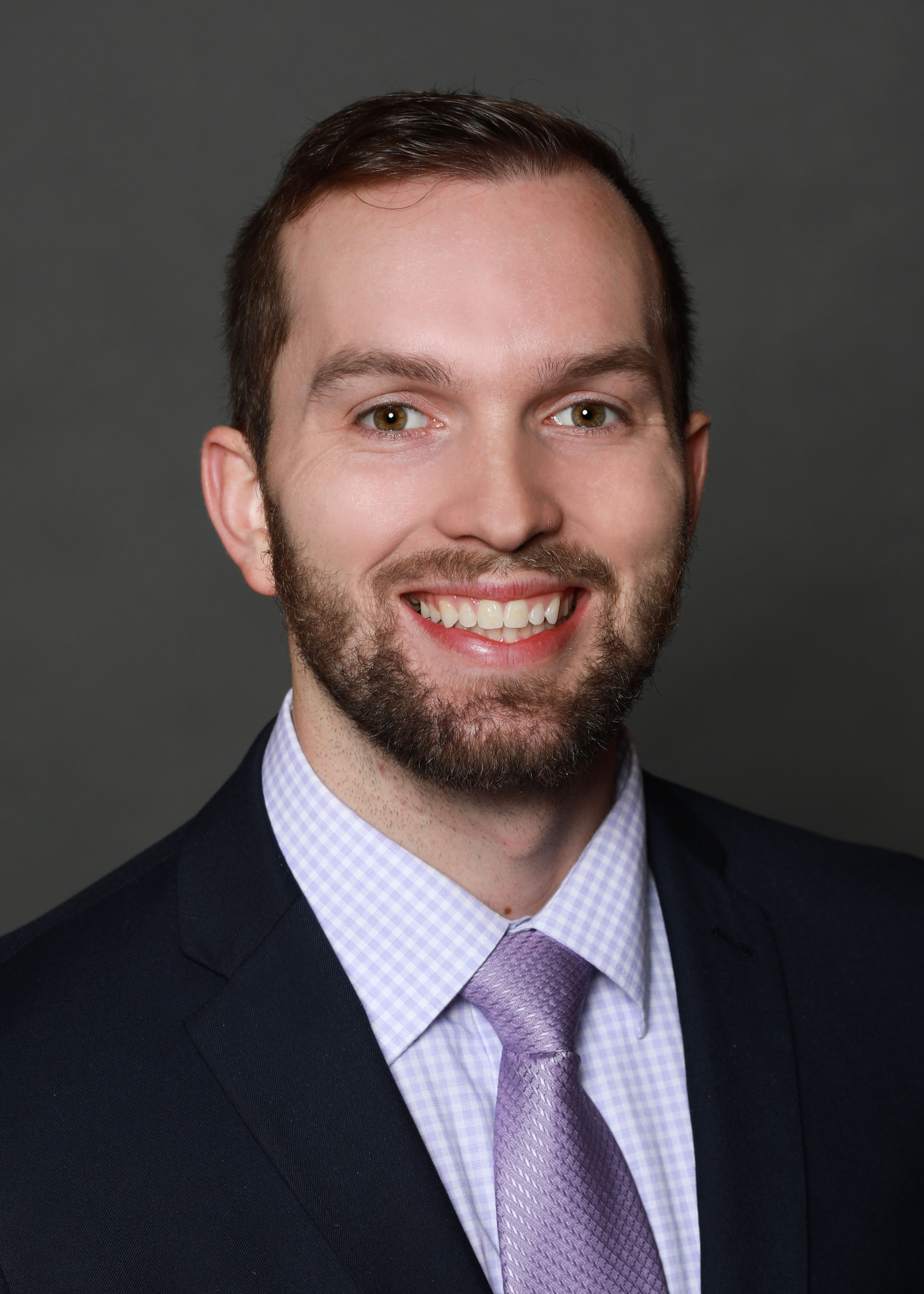
- Wheeler in 2021

Member of the Iowa House of Representatives from the 4th district
- Incumbent
- Assumed office January 9, 2017
- Preceded by: John Kooiker

Personal details
- Born: April 24, 1993 (age 33) Centralia, Washington, U.S.
- Party: Republican
- Spouse: Jess
- Education: Grays Harbor College; Northwestern College
- Website: legis.iowa.gov/...

Skyler Wheeler (born April 24, 1993) is an American politician. A member of the Republican Party, he has served as member of the Iowa House of Representatives, representing the 4th district since 2017. Wheeler is also employed as a high school baseball coach.

== College career ==
Wheeler graduated from Grays Harbor College, where he played baseball. Wheeler broke the all-time hits record and received an athletic scholarship to Northwestern College in Orange City, Iowa. At Northwestern, Wheeler broke the school's single-season RBI and double records, while batting a career .362 with 114 RBIs. Wheeler led the Great Plains Athletic Conference (GPAC) in RBI (66) in 2014 and hits (76) in 2015.

== Iowa House of Representatives ==
Wheeler finished first in a field of three candidates during a 2016 party primary. He was subsequently elected in a general election later that year to replace retiring Republican representative John Kooiker. At age 23, Wheeler was the youngest elected member of the Iowa General Assembly in 2016. He defeated independent candidate Jeff VanDerWerff in the general election, who had lost the Republican primary earlier that year. In his bid for a second term in 2018, Wheeler ran unopposed.

In the 2020 general election, Wheeler defeated Democratic Party candidate Björn Johnson.

In a 2022 primary, Wheeler defeated Dordt University student Kendal Zylstra, winning 52% of the vote. Wheeler was initially based in Orange City and declared a bid in District 3, but instead chose to move to Hull, in District 4. Wheeler won reelection unopposed in 2024.

Wheeler currently serves as the Chair of the House Education Committee. Wheeler also serves on the Judiciary Committee, Higher Education Committee, Public Safety Committee, Education Appropriations Subcommittee, and School Finance Formula Review Committee.

== Electoral history ==
Election	Political result	Candidate	Party	Votes	%
Iowa House of Representatives primary elections, 2016; District 4 Turnout: 4,767	Republican	Skyler Wheeler	Republican	2,120	44.47%
Iowa House of Representatives primary elections, 2016; District 4 Turnout: 4,767	Republican	Kevin Van Otterloo	Republican	1,427	29.93%
Iowa House of Representatives primary elections, 2016; District 4 Turnout: 4,767	Republican	Jeffrey VanDerWerff	Republican	1,219	25.57%
Iowa House of Representatives primary elections, 2016; District 4 Turnout: 4,767	Republican	Write-In	Republican	1	0.02%
Iowa House of Representatives elections, 2016; District 4 Turnout: 15,663	Republican hold	Skyler Wheeler	Republican	9,815	62.66%
Iowa House of Representatives elections, 2016; District 4 Turnout: 15,663	Republican hold	Jeffrey VanDerWerff	Independent	5,838	37.27%
Iowa House of Representatives elections, 2016; District 4 Turnout: 15,663	Republican hold	Write-In		10	0.06%
Iowa House of Representatives primary elections, 2022; District 4 Turnout: 4,620	Republican	Skyler Wheeler	Republican	2,418	52.34%
Iowa House of Representatives primary elections, 2022; District 4 Turnout: 4,620	Republican	Kendal Zylstra	Republican	2,199	47.60%
Iowa House of Representatives primary elections, 2022; District 4 Turnout: 4,620	Republican	Write-In	Republican	3	0.06%

Iowa House of Representatives
Preceded by John Kooiker	4th District; 2017 – present	Succeeded by Incumbent
