= Ted D. Clark =

American politician (1920–1980)

Member of the Iowa Senate
- In office January 12, 1953 – January 13, 1957

Member of the Iowa House of Representatives
- In office January 10, 1949 – January 11, 1953

Personal details
- Born: Ted Donald Clark; June 12, 1920 Detroit, Michigan, U.S.
- Died: May 3, 1980 (aged 59) Mystic, Iowa, U.S.
- Party: Republican

Ted D. Clark (June 12, 1920 – May 3, 1980) was an American politician from the state of Iowa.

Clark was born in Detroit, Michigan, in 1920 and moved with his parents to Appanoose County, Iowa, a year later. He graduated from Mystic High School. He served as a Republican in both the Iowa House of Representatives from 1949 to 1953, and in the Iowa Senate from 1953 to 1957. Clark died in 1980.

Iowa House of Representatives
Preceded by Leonard E. Scott	4th district 1949–1953	Succeeded by Robert K. Beck
Iowa Senate
Preceded by D. Sherman West	3rd district 1953–1957	Succeeded by Gene Lyle Hoffman
