= Boyden, Iowa =

- City
- Motto: Watch Us Grow!
- Location of Boyden, Iowa
- Coordinates: 43°11′22″N 96°0′02″W
- Country: US
- State: Iowa
- County: Sioux
- Incorporated: May 24, 1889

Government
  - Type: Mayor-council

Area
  - Total: 0.68 sq mi (1.77 km^{2})
  - Land: 0.68 sq mi (1.77 km^{2})
  - Water: 0 sq mi (0.00 km^{2})
- Elevation: 1,424 ft (434 m)

Population (2020)
  - Total: 701
  - Density: 1,025/sq mi (395.8/km^{2})
- Time zone: UTC-6 (Central (CST))
  - Summer (DST): UTC-5 (CDT)
- ZIP code: 51234
- Area code: 712
- FIPS code: 19-07840
- GNIS feature ID: 2394233
- Website: City of Boyden

Boyden is a city in Sioux County, Iowa, United States. The population was 701 at the 2020 census.

== Geography ==
According to the United States Census Bureau, the city has a total area of 0.75 square miles (1.94 km^{2}), all land.

== Demographics ==
Historical populations
Year	Pop.	±%
1890	277	—
1900	336	+21.3%
1910	364	+8.3%
1920	419	+15.1%
1930	446	+6.4%
1940	487	+9.2%
1950	541	+11.1%
1960	562	+3.9%
1970	670	+19.2%
1980	708	+5.7%
1990	651	−8.1%
2000	672	+3.2%
2010	707	+5.2%
2020	701	−0.8%
Source:"U.S. Census website". United States Census Bureau. and Iowa Data Center; Source: U.S. Decennial Census

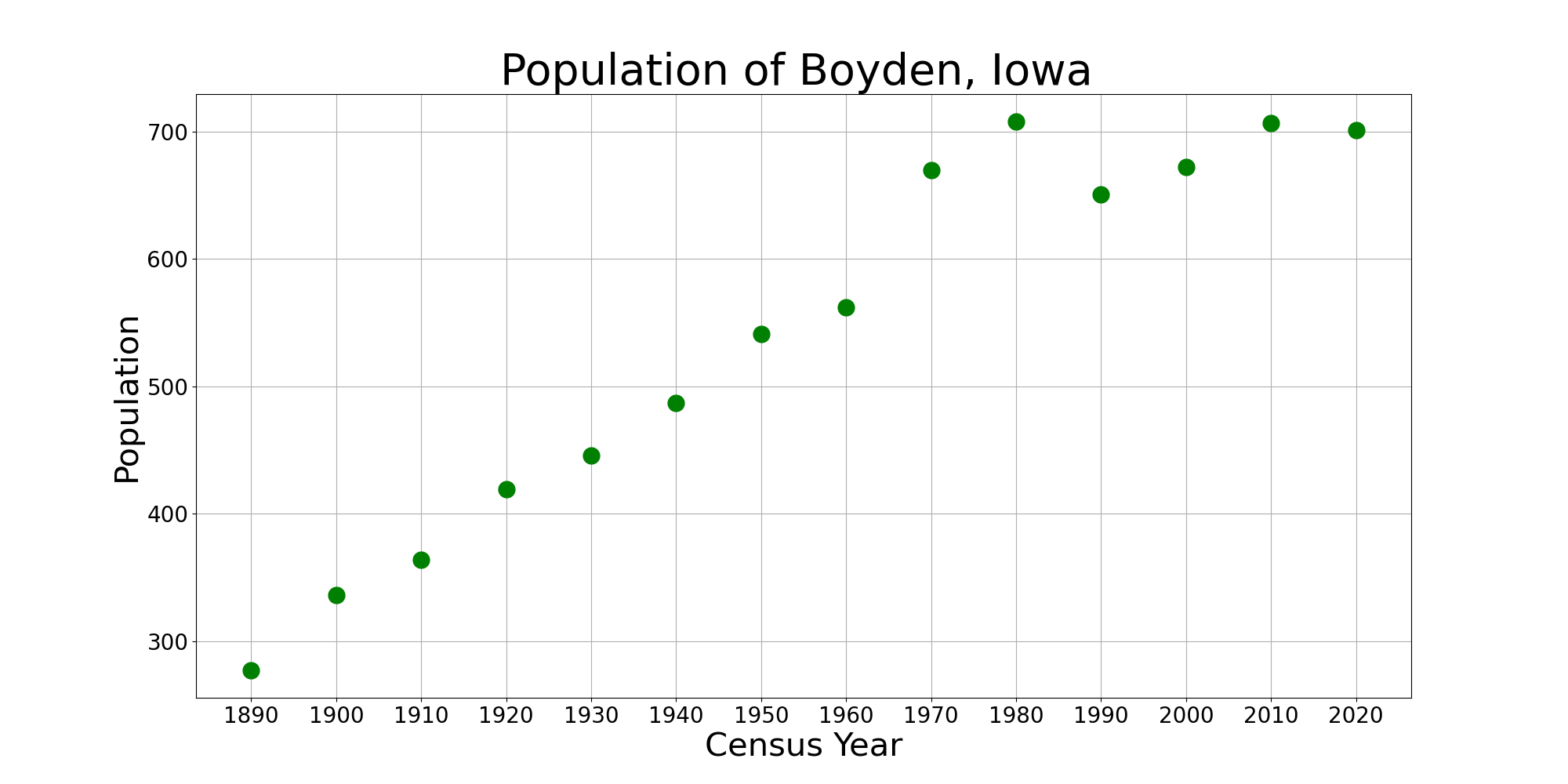
The population of Boyden, Iowa from US census data

=== 2020 census ===
As of the census of 2020, there were 701 people, 276 households, and 201 families residing in the city. The population density was 1,025.1 inhabitants per square mile (395.8/km^{2}). There were 295 housing units at an average density of 431.4 per square mile (166.6/km^{2}). The racial makeup of the city was 88.9% White, 0.3% Black or African American, 0.1% Native American, 0.1% Asian, 0.0% Pacific Islander, 5.7% from other races and 4.9% from two or more races. Hispanic or Latino persons of any race comprised 10.6% of the population.

Of the 276 households, 33.0% of which had children under the age of 18 living with them, 62.0% were married couples living together, 3.3% were cohabitating couples, 16.7% had a female householder with no spouse or partner present and 18.1% had a male householder with no spouse or partner present. 27.2% of all households were non-families. 25.0% of all households were made up of individuals, 9.8% had someone living alone who was 65 years old or older.

The median age in the city was 37.3 years. 29.4% of the residents were under the age of 20; 3.9% were between the ages of 20 and 24; 27.4% were from 25 and 44; 26.5% were from 45 and 64; and 12.8% were 65 years of age or older. The gender makeup of the city was 52.6% male and 47.4% female.

=== 2010 census ===
As of the census of 2010, there were 707 people, 279 households, and 208 families residing in the city. The population density was 942.7 inhabitants per square mile (364.0/km^{2}). There were 290 housing units at an average density of 386.7 per square mile (149.3/km^{2}). The racial makeup of the city was 93.6% White, 0.4% African American, 0.1% Native American, 1.1% Asian, 3.5% from other races, and 1.1% from two or more races. Hispanic or Latino of any race were 9.5% of the population.

There were 279 households, of which 34.1% had children under the age of 18 living with them, 63.8% were married couples living together, 6.8% had a female householder with no husband present, 3.9% had a male householder with no wife present, and 25.4% were non-families. 22.9% of all households were made up of individuals, and 9.7% had someone living alone who was 65 years of age or older. The average household size was 2.53 and the average family size was 2.97.

The median age in the city was 36.2 years. 27.9% of residents were under the age of 18; 7% were between the ages of 18 and 24; 24.9% were from 25 to 44; 23.5% were from 45 to 64; and 16.8% were 65 years of age or older. The gender makeup of the city was 50.5% male and 49.5% female.

=== 2000 census ===
As of the census of 2000, there were 672 people, 275 households, and 207 families residing in the city. The population density was 1,932.9 inhabitants per square mile (746.3/km^{2}). There were 285 housing units at an average density of 819.8 per square mile (316.5/km^{2}). The racial makeup of the city was 97.62% White, 0.30% African American, 0.60% Asian, 1.19% from other races, and 0.30% from two or more races. Hispanic or Latino of any race were 2.08% of the population.

There were 275 households, out of which 33.8% had children under the age of 18 living with them, 66.2% were married couples living together, 6.5% had a female householder with no husband present, and 24.7% were non-families. 23.3% of all households were made up of individuals, and 13.8% had someone living alone who was 65 years of age or older. The average household size was 2.44 and the average family size was 2.88.

In the city, the population was spread out, with 25.4% under the age of 18, 8.6% from 18 to 24, 26.3% from 25 to 44, 19.0% from 45 to 64, and 20.5% who were 65 years of age or older. The median age was 38 years. For every 100 females, there were 106.1 males. For every 100 females age 18 and over, there were 98.8 males.

The median income for a household in the city was $39,688, and the median income for a family was $43,971. Males had a median income of $31,000 versus $18,958 for females. The per capita income for the city was $17,323. About 3.4% of families and 5.3% of the population were below the poverty line, including 2.9% of those under age 18 and 9.0% of those age 65 or over.

== Education ==
Boyden–Hull Community School District includes Boyden in its boundary, and operates Boyden–Hull Elementary School in Boyden, and Boyden–Hull Junior/High School in Hull; the latter houses the district's headquarters.

== Notable people ==
- Kevin Alons, member of the Iowa Senate
- John Kooiker, politician
- Sam Kooiker, politician
- Richard Vande Hoef. politician

== See also ==
- Floyd River
