= Stephen A. Martin =

American politician (1871–1957)

Member of the Iowa House of Representatives from the 4th district
- In office January 9, 1939 – January 12, 1941; January 13, 1941 – January 10, 1943; January 11, 1943 – January 7, 1945; January 8, 1945 – January 12, 1947
- Preceded by: Charles McFatridge
- Succeeded by: Leonard E. Scott

Personal details
- Born: Stephen Anthony Martin; November 26, 1871 Centerville, Iowa, United States
- Died: February 16, 1957 (aged 85) Centerville, Iowa, United States
- Party: Republican

Stephen Anthony Martin (November 26, 1871 – February 16, 1957) was an American politician from the state of Iowa.

Martin was born in Centerville, Iowa, in 1871. He served as a Republican in the Iowa House of Representatives for four terms from 1939 to 1947. Martin died in Centerville in 1957.

Iowa House of Representatives
| Preceded by Charles McFatridge | 4th district 1939–1947 | Succeeded by Leonard E. Scott |
