= Edmund Hanson =

American politician (1889–1953)

Member of the Iowa House of Representatives from the 4th district
- In office January 14, 1935 – January 10, 1937
- Preceded by: Forest Davis
- Succeeded by: Charles McFatridge

Personal details
- Born: Edmund Perry Hanson; August 14, 1889 Iroquois County, Illinois, United States
- Died: January 11, 1953 (aged 63) Centerville, Iowa, United States
- Party: Republican
- Education: Iowa State University

Edmund Perry Hanson (August 14, 1889 – January 11, 1953) was an American politician and a veteran of World War I from the state of Iowa.

Hanson was born in Iroquois County, Illinois in 1889. He grew up on a farm near Dean, Iowa. He graduated from Moulton High School in 1907 and afterwards from Iowa State University. He served as a Republican for one term in the Iowa House of Representatives from January 14, 1935, to January 10, 1937. Hanson died in Centerville, Appanoose County, Iowa in 1953. He was interred in Oakland Cemetery in Centerville.

Iowa House of Representatives
Preceded by Forest Davis	4th district 1935–1937	Succeeded by Charles McFatridge
