= Andrew Van Ginkel =

American football player (born 1995)

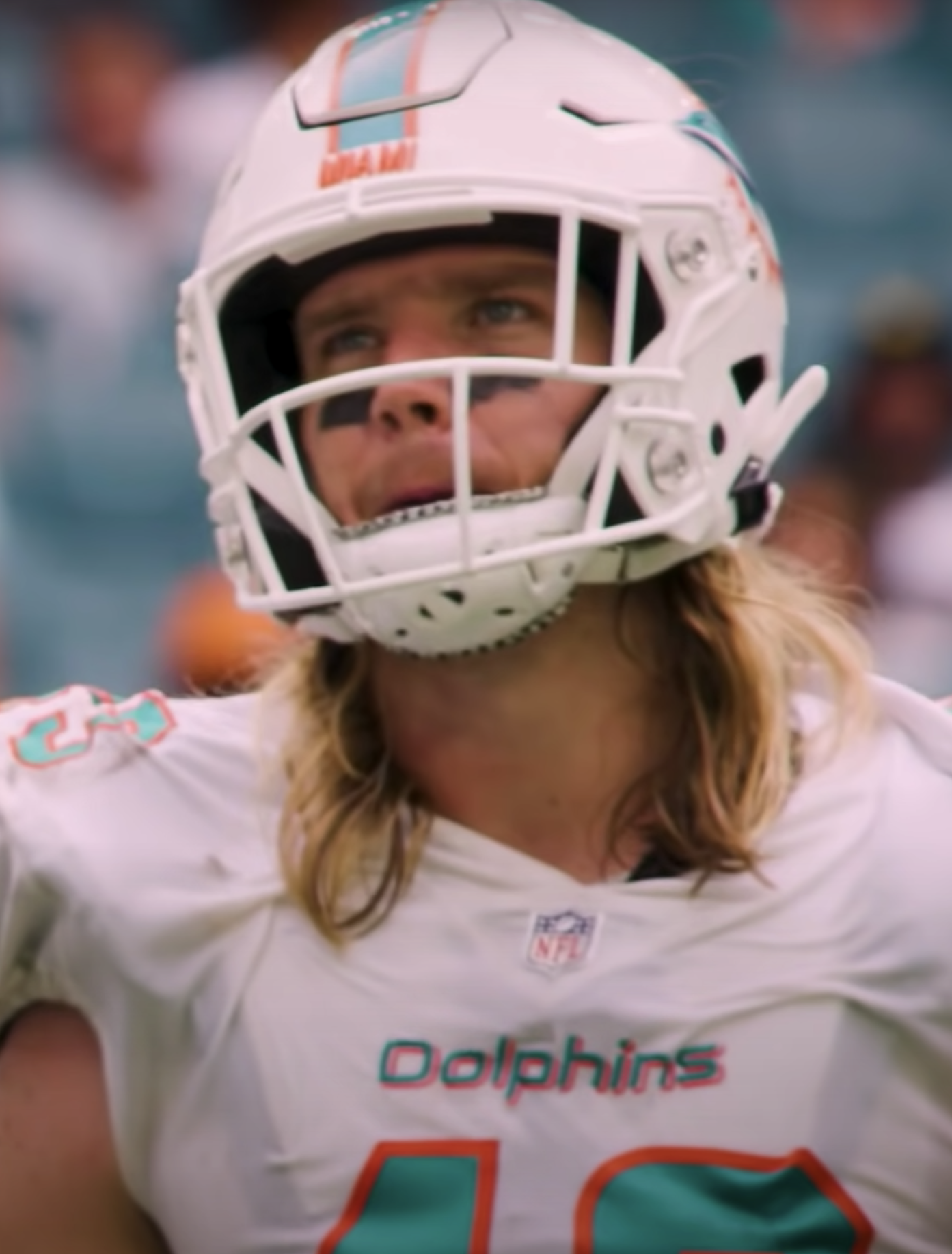
- Van Ginkel with the Miami Dolphins in 2021

No. 43 – Minnesota Vikings
- Position: Outside linebacker
- Roster status: Active

Personal information
- Born: July 1, 1995 (age 31); Rock Valley, Iowa, U.S.
- Listed height: 6 ft 4 in (1.93 m)
- Listed weight: 242 lb (110 kg)

Career information
- High school: Rock Valley
- College: South Dakota (2014–2015); Iowa Western (2016); Wisconsin (2017–2018)
- NFL draft: 2019: 5th round, 151st overall pick

Career history
- Miami Dolphins (2019–2023); Minnesota Vikings (2024–present)

Awards and highlights
- Second-team All-Pro (2024); Pro Bowl (2024); Third-team All-Big Ten (2018)

Career NFL statistics as of Week 10, 2026
- Total tackles: 411
- Sacks: 44.0
- Forced fumbles: 7
- Fumble recoveries: 7
- Pass deflections: 38
- Interceptions: 6
- Interception return yards: 169
- Total touchdowns: 5
- Stats at Pro Football Reference

Andrew Van Ginkel (born July 1, 1995) is an American professional football outside linebacker for the Minnesota Vikings of the National Football League (NFL). He played college football for the South Dakota Coyotes before transferring to the Wisconsin Badgers. Van Ginkel was selected by the Miami Dolphins in the fifth round of the 2019 NFL draft.

== Early life ==
Van Ginkel attended Rock Valley Community High School in Rock Valley, Iowa, where he played football for the Nighthawks, a consolidated team shared with Boyden–Hull High School, as a quarterback and defensive back. He did not participate in recruiting camps following his senior year of high school football, and did not attract attention from many large schools.

== College career ==
Van Ginkel began his college career at the University of South Dakota, where he played defensive end. He redshirted, then played for one season, earning first-team all Missouri Valley Football Conference honors as a freshman. Van Ginkel then transferred to Iowa Western Community College after head coach Joe Glenn retired. At Iowa Western, Van Ginkel continued to play defensive end. He transferred to the University of Wisconsin and played outside linebacker for two seasons.

== Professional career ==
Pre-draft measurables
Height	Weight	Arm length	Hand span	Wingspan	40-yard dash	10-yard split	20-yard split	20-yard shuttle	Three-cone drill	Vertical jump	Broad jump	Bench press
6 ft 3 1/2 in (1.92 m)	241 lb (109 kg)	32 1/2 in (0.83 m)	9 3/8 in (0.24 m)	6 ft 5 3/8 in (1.97 m)	4.59 s	1.62 s	2.52 s	4.14 s	6.89 s	38.0 in (0.97 m)	10 ft 3 in (3.12 m)	17 reps
All values from NFL Combine/Pro Day

=== Miami Dolphins ===
Van Ginkel was drafted by the Miami Dolphins in the fifth round, 151st overall, of the 2019 NFL draft. He was placed on injured reserve on September 6, 2019. He was designated for return from injured reserve on November 13, 2019, and began practicing with the team again. He was activated on November 20, 2019. On November 1, 2020, against the Los Angeles Rams, Van Ginkel recovered a fumble lost by Jared Goff and returned it for a 78-yard touchdown during the 28–17 win. This was the second longest fumble return in Dolphins' team history. In Week 11 against the Denver Broncos, Van Ginkel forced a fumble on running back Melvin Gordon at the goal line which was recovered by the Dolphins during the 20–13 loss.

On March 23, 2023, Van Ginkel re-signed with the Dolphins on a one-year contract. On January 9, 2024, the Dolphins placed him on injured reserve.

=== Minnesota Vikings ===
On March 13, 2024, Van Ginkel signed a two-year, $20 million contract with the Minnesota Vikings. In his first game with the team on September 8 against the New York Giants, he recorded a sack and an interception, joining Kevin Williams and Harrison Smith as the third Vikings player since 2000 to do both in the first game of a season. Van Ginkel also scored a touchdown from a 10-yard interception return from Giants quarterback Daniel Jones, marking the Vikings first pick-six since Week 17 of the 2021 season. In Week 5 against the New York Jets in London, Van Ginkel scored his second pick-six as a Viking and the third of his career after intercepting Jets quarterback Aaron Rodgers and returning the ball 63 yards to the endzone. In Week 16, Van Ginkel recorded five tackles and two sacks in a 27–24 win over the Seattle Seahawks, earning NFC Defensive Player of the Week. He was ranked 88th by his fellow players on the NFL Top 100 Players of 2025.

On April 29, 2025, Van Ginkel signed a one-year contract extension with the Vikings worth $23 million.

In Week 10 of the 2026 season against the Green Bay Packers, Van Ginkel recorded three total tackles and one sack on Jordan Love. He also forced and recovered a fumble by Packers' tight end Mark Redman, which resulted in a 34-yard field goal for the Vikings.

== Career statistics ==
=== NFL ===
Legend
	Led the league
**Bold**	Career high

==== Regular season ====
Year	Team	Games		Tackles						Interceptions						Fumbles			
Year	Team	GP	GS	Cmb	Solo	Ast	Sck	TfL	Sfty	PD	Int	Yds	Avg	Lng	TD	FF	FR	Yds	TD
2019	MIA	6	1	15	11	4	1.0	4	0	0	0	0	0	0	0	0	1	0	0
2020	MIA	16	11	48	29	19	5.5	7	0	4	0	0	0	0	0	**3**	1	**78**	**1**
2021	MIA	17	14	71	**50**	21	4.0	9	0	7	0	0	0	0	0	1	0	0	0
2022	MIA	17	5	47	24	23	0.5	3	0	2	1	23	23.0	23	0	0	0	0	0
2023	MIA	17	11	69	42	27	6.0	8	0	8	1	33	33.0	33	1	0	1	29	0
2024	MIN	17	17	**79**	**50**	**29**	**11.5**	**18**	0	6	**2**	**73**	36.5	**63**	**2**	1	0	0	0
2025	MIN	12	11	54	28	26	7.0	11	0	**10**	1	40	**40.0**	40	0	0	**2**	0	0
2026	MIN	9	9	28	16	12	8.5	9	0	1	1	0	0.0	0	0	2	2	7	0
Career		111	79	411	250	161	44.0	69	0	38	6	169	28.2	63	3	7	7	114	1

==== Postseason ====
Year	Team	Games		Tackles						Interceptions						Fumbles			
Year	Team	GP	GS	Cmb	Solo	Ast	Sck	TfL	Sfty	PD	Int	Yds	Avg	Lng	TD	FF	FR	Yds	TD
2022	MIA	1	1	1	0	1	0.0	0	0	0	0	0	0	0	0	0	0	0	0
2024	MIN	1	1	**3**	**1**	**2**	**1.0**	**1**	0	0	0	0	0	0	0	0	0	0	0
Career		2	2	4	1	3	1.0	1	0	0	0	0	0	0	0	0	0	0	0

=== College ===
College statistics
Year	Team	Class	Position	GP	Tackles			Interceptions					Fumbles	
Year	Team	Class	Position	GP	Total	Loss	Sack	Int	Yards	Avg	TD	PD	FR	FF
2015	South Dakota	Freshman	DE	11	56	**18.0**	**9.0**	0	0	0.0	0	**6**	**3**	2
2017	Wisconsin	Junior	LB	**14**	39	10.0	6.5	**2**	**11**	**5.5**	**1**	2	1	2
2018	Wisconsin	Senior	LB	12	**59**	9.5	5.5	0	0	0.0	0	3	0	2
Career				37	154	37.5	21	2	11	5.5	1	11	4	6

== Personal life ==
Van Ginkel is a Christian. He is married to Samantha Van Ginkel. They have three sons together.
