= John Kooiker =

American politician (born 1946)

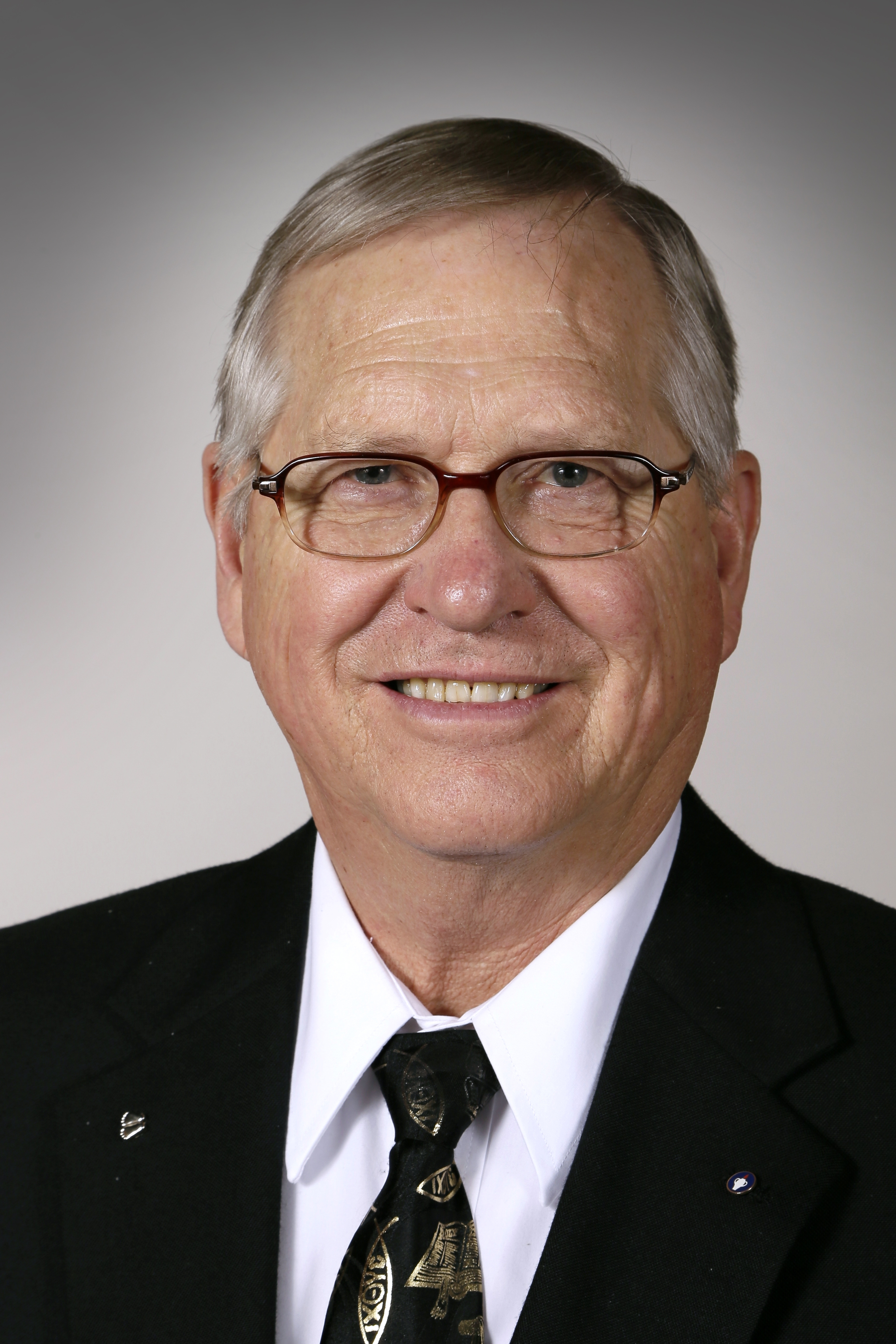
- 86th General Assembly portrait (2015)

Member of the Iowa House of Representatives from the 4th district
- In office January 13, 2015 – January 8, 2017
- Preceded by: Dwayne Alons
- Succeeded by: Skyler Wheeler

Personal details
- Born: June 28, 1946 (age 80) Sioux County, Iowa, U.S.
- Party: Republican
- Spouse: Sherry Kooiker (m. 1971)
- Children: 4; including Sam
- Occupation: Teacher, Farmer
- Website: legis.iowa.gov/...

Military service
- Allegiance: United States
- Branch/service: United States Army

John J. Kooiker (born June 28, 1946) is an American politician affiliated with the Republican Party who served in the Iowa House of Representatives from 2015 to 2017. He was elected from the fourth district.

== Early life and career ==
Kooiker is one of seven children born to John and Johanna Kooiker (née Vermeer). He graduated from Western Christian High School in 1964, as class valedictorian. He attended Calvin College, graduating in 1968, then Kansas State University, where he earned a masters in math education. Kooiker served in the United States Army during the Vietnam War. He left the army and began teaching math and physics at the Christian Academy in Japan in 1972. Kooiker returned to the United States in 1975, and pursued Ph.D studies, later moving to rural Boyden, Iowa. He worked for the United States Postal Service as a letter carrier from 1977 to 2005.

== Political career ==
Kooiker defeated Democrat John Bunstma and write-in candidate Dennis Wright, a former mayor of Hull, Iowa, in the special election called on January 6, 2015, after the November 2014 death of Dwayne Alons. He was sworn into office on January 13, 2015. Kookier served on the Labor, Local Government, Public Safety, and Veteran Affairs committees and co-chaired the Transportation, Infrastructure, and Capitals Appropriations Subcommittee. In October 2015, Kooiker stated that he would not seek a second term. He endorsed Skyler Wheeler, who won the Republican primary for the Fourth District in June 2016.

In January 2024, Kooiker became vice chair of the Sioux County Soil and Water Conservation District.

== Personal life ==
Kooiker and his wife Sherry have four children. One of his sons, Sam, first ran for the mayor of Rapid City, South Dakota in 2007, but lost. He ran again and won the office in 2011, serving until 2015. A daughter, Bonnie, died of cancer in October 2007.
