= Iowa Office of Civil Rights =

State agency in Iowa

- Type: State Agency
- Location: Des Moines, Iowa
- Executive Director: Kristen Stiffler
- Website: https://icrc.iowa.gov/

The Iowa Office of Civil Rights is the state agency that enforces the Iowa Civil Rights Act of 1965, Iowa's anti-discrimination law.

== Executive Director ==
- Kristen Stiffler

== Background ==
The concept for the Iowa Civil Rights Commission was first introduced in 1964 in a law review article published by Arthur E. Bonfield. The idea led to the passage of the Iowa Civil Rights Act, which formally created the commission. The Iowa Civil Rights Act of 1965 prohibits discrimination in the areas of employment, housing, credit, public accommodations and education. Discrimination, or different treatment, is illegal if based on race, color, creed, national origin, religion, sex, sexual orientation, pregnancy, physical disability, mental disability, age (in employment and credit), familial status (in housing and credit) or marital status (in credit). In addition, it is illegal to retaliate for discrimination complaint, participating in an investigation of a discrimination complaint, or having opposed discriminatory conduct.

== Cooperation with local and federal agencies ==
The Iowa Office of Civil Rights coordinates its investigative efforts with local civil and human rights commissions located in cities in Iowa. In addition, the commission will also partner with the local commissions to for educational outreach events to the public. The Iowa Office of Civil Rights also cooperates with federal anti-discrimination agencies. The Equal Employment Opportunity Commission (EEOC) has the designated the Iowa Office of Civil Rights as the Fair Employment Practices Agency (FEPA) for Iowa. As a FEPA, the Agency has a worksharing agreement with the EEOC. Under this agreement, the Agency investigates complaints of employment discrimination in Iowa that are cross-filed with both the Commission and the EEOC. The Iowa Office Civil Rights also is the state agency for Iowa that participates in the U.S. Department of Housing and Urban Development's Fair Housing Assistance Program (FHAP). Under this program, the Agency investigates and enforces complaints of housing discrimination under the Fair Housing Act.

== Alignment ==
In 2023, as part of a state government-wide initiative to align operations, resources, and services, the Iowa Office of Civil Rights was aligned with Iowa Department of Inspections, Appeals, and Licensing (DIAL).

== Boards and Commissions ==
In 2024, as part of a bill designed to eliminate unnecessary and redundant State of Iowa boards and commissions, the Iowa Civil Rights Commission was converted into an advisory panel and based within the Iowa Office of Civil Rights, which continues to enforce both State and Federal Civil Rights laws in the same manner as it did prior to the passage of the bill.

=== Iowa Civil Rights Commission Commissioners ===
- Sam Kooiker - Chairperson
- Don DeKock - Commissioner
- Cheryl Elsloo - Commissioner

== Controversy ==
=== LGBTQ Protections ===
In 1983, the Iowa Civil Rights Commission was sued for failing to investigate the civil rights charge of a transgender women in the case of Sommers v. ICRC, stating it had a lack of jurisdiction. The Iowa Supreme Court affirmed the Iowa Civil Rights Commission's determination that gender identity was not included under the protected characteristic of sex in chapter 601A and there had been no intent by legislature to expand the traditional meaning of sex . The commission was found to be not unreasonable, arbitrary, or capricious in denying jurisdiction.

Effective July 1, 2007, the Iowa Civil Rights Act (Iowa Code Chapter 216) was expanded to add sexual orientation and gender identity to the list of protected classes, making it illegal in Iowa to discriminate against a person because of his/her sexual orientation or gender identity.

On June 15, 2020, the Supreme Court delivered its landmark ruling in Altitude Express, Inc. v. Zarda that the term 'sex' as described in the Civil Rights Act of 1964, encompassed workers who identified as members of the LGBTQ community, aligning federal civil rights protections with protections already available under Iowa State law.

=== Litigation ===
In 2020, the Agency was sued in Federal Court under Title VI for its use of federal funds towards an investigatory process that contributes to discrimination and harassment within the state rather than its eradication. However, the case was summarily dismissed as the court lacked jurisdiction and the plaintiff's claims substantively failed.

== Historical Outcomes of the Iowa Office of Civil Rights ==
On average, more than half of the charges reviewed by the Iowa Office of Civil Rights are administratively closed following an investigation.

=== 2018-2019 Civil Rights Enforcement Outcomes ===
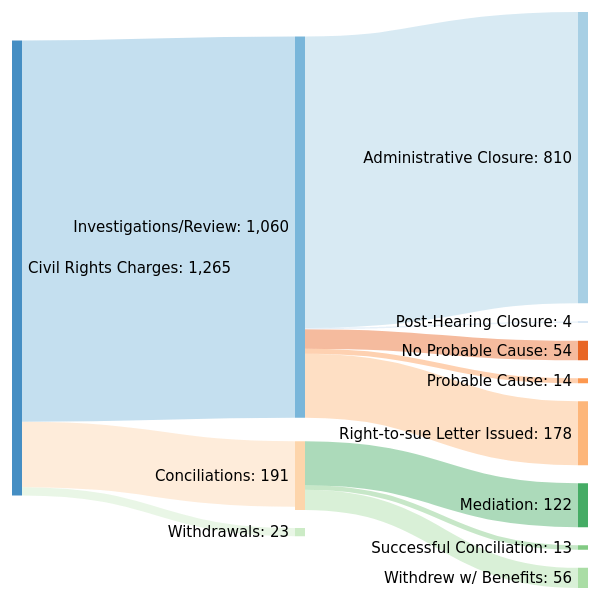
2019 Enforcement Outcomes

=== 2019-2020 Civil Rights Enforcement Outcomes ===
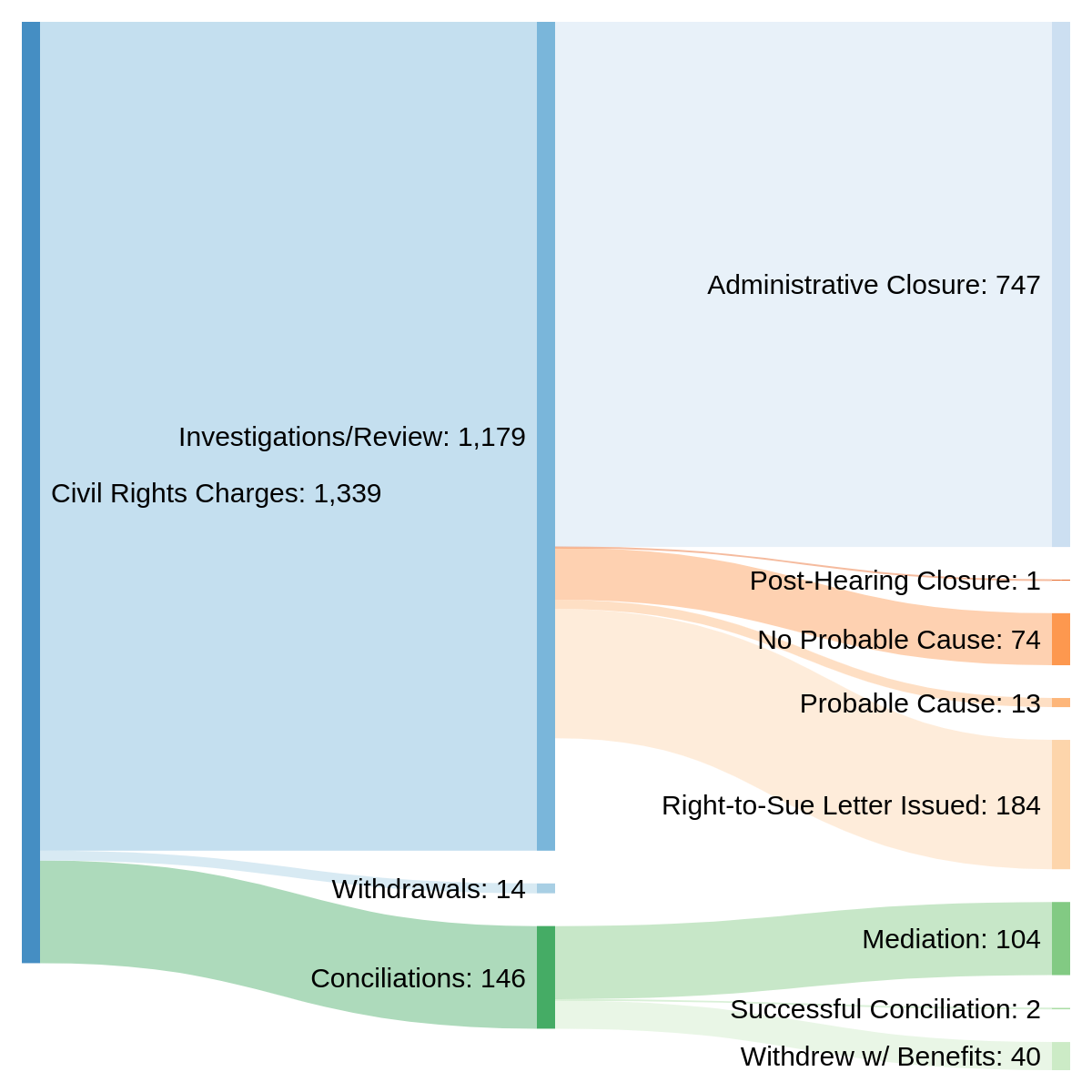
2019 Enforcement Outcomes

=== 2020-2021 Civil Rights Enforcement Outcomes ===
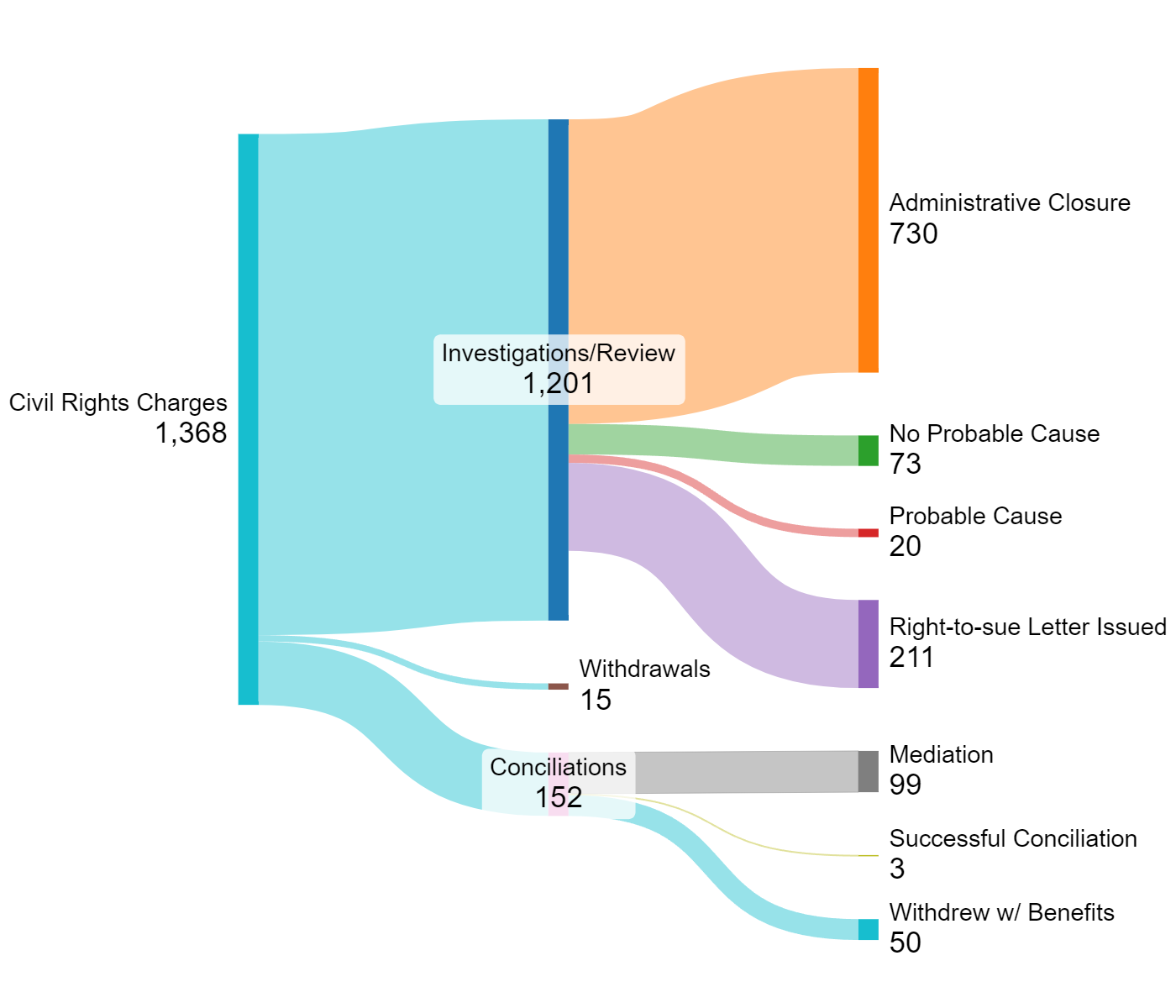
2021-2021 Annual Case Closures by Category
