= Forest Davis =

American politician (1879–1958)

Member of the Iowa House of Representatives from the 4th district
- In office January 9, 1933 – January 13, 1935
- Preceded by: Howard Ballew
- Succeeded by: Edmund Hanson

Personal details
- Born: March 28, 1879 Wayne County, Iowa, United States
- Died: January 27, 1958 (aged 78) Centerville, Iowa, United States
- Party: Democratic

Forest Davis (March 28, 1879 – January 27, 1958) was an American politician from the state of Iowa.

Davis was born in Wayne County, Iowa, in 1879. He served as a Democrat for one term in the Iowa House of Representatives from January 9, 1933, to January 13, 1935. Davis died in Centerville, Appanoose County, Iowa in 1958. He was interred in Oakland Cemetery, Moulton, Iowa.

Iowa House of Representatives
| Preceded by Howard Ballew | 4th district 1933–1935 | Succeeded by Edmund Hanson |
