= Impact Confections =

American candymaker

- Company type: Subsidiary
- Founded: 1981; 45 years ago
- Brands: Warheads
- Parent: Kua LLC
- Website: www.impactconfections.com

Impact Confections is an American candy manufacturer founded in 1981. It trades under the WARHEADS brand and Melster Candies Brands. WARHEADS is a brand of sour candies. Melster Candies, established in 1919, is a brand of marshmallow candies. Most of Impact Confections' branded and co-manufactured candies are produced in their SQF Certified facility in Janesville, Wisconsin. It is owned by Mexican firm Kua LLC.

In 2013, its revenues were estimated at between $50 and $55 million.

== Products ==
=== Warheads ===
Warheads - Impact's flagship brand - are a brand of sour confectionery in five fruit flavors, as they come in different varieties.

=== Current Impact Confections products ===
- WARHEADS Extreme Sour Hard Candy
- WARHEADS Chewy Cubes
- WARHEADS Worms
- WARHEADS SMASHUPS Extreme Sour Hard Candy
- WARHEADS Sour Twists
- WARHEADS Sour Taffy
- WARHEADS Sour Gum (Green Apple, Blue Raspberry and Watermelon flavors)
- WARHEADS Dippin' Ring
- WARHEADS Sour Soda
- Melster Circus Peanuts
- Melster Peanut Butter Kisses
