= Sam Kooiker =

American politician (born 1974)

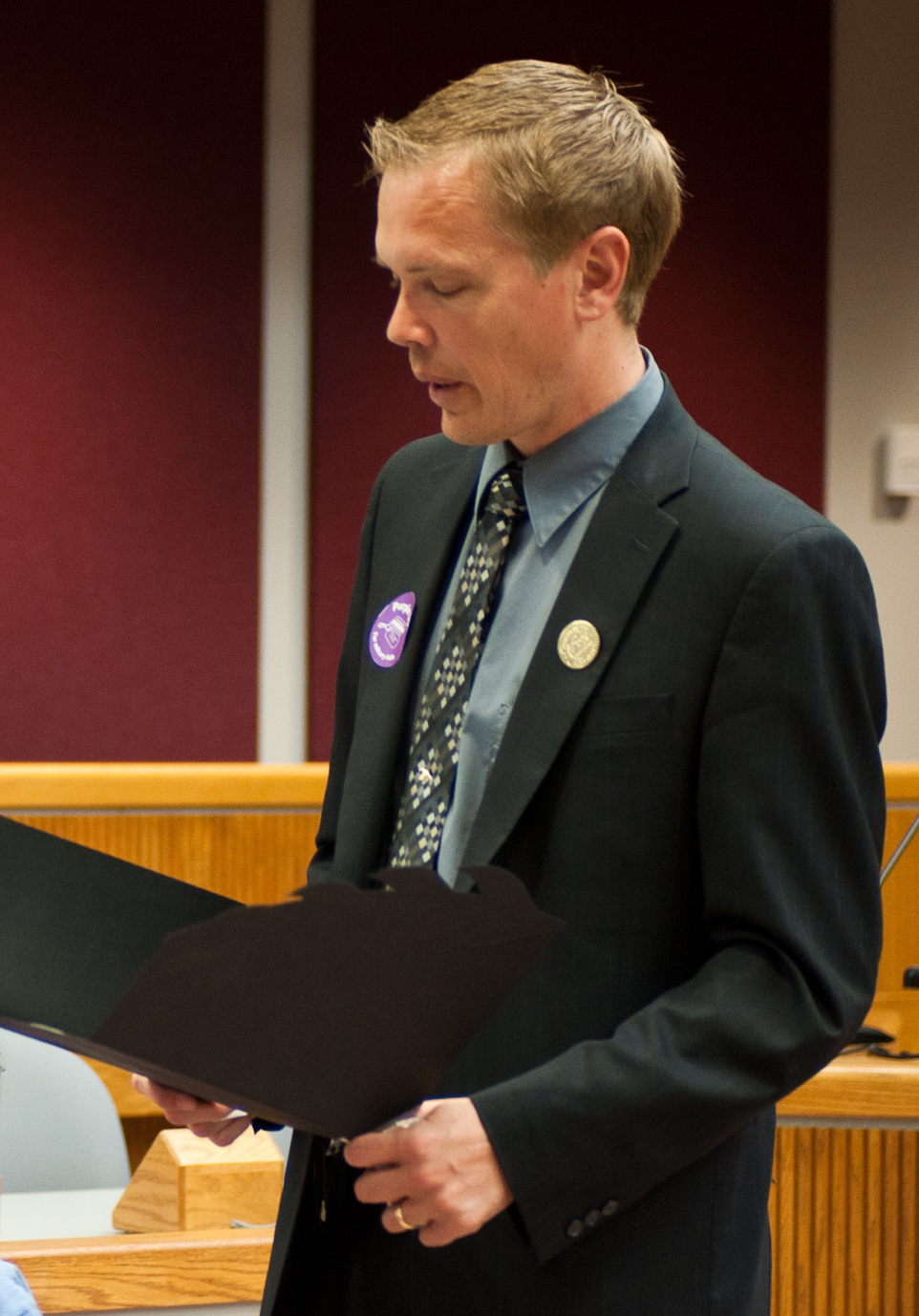
- Kooiker in 2012

Mayor of Rapid City, South Dakota
- In office July 5, 2011 – July 6, 2015
- Preceded by: Alan Hanks
- Succeeded by: Steve Allender

Personal details
- Born: March 9, 1974 (age 52)
- Party: Republican
- Spouse: Jennifer King (m. 1999)
- Children: 3
- Parents: John Kooiker (father); Sherry Kooiker (mother)
- Website: standwithsam.com Archived on November 26, 2022

Sam Kooiker (born March 9, 1974) is an American politician who served as Mayor of Rapid City, South Dakota from 2011 to 2015. Kooiker returned to his home state of Iowa and successively served as city manager for the cities of Cherokee and Sheldon.

== Early life ==
Kooiker was born on March 9, 1974, in Japan, while his father John Kooiker taught at the Christian Academy. The family returned to the United States in 1975, where Kooiker and three siblings grew up on the family farm in Boyden, Iowa. He attended Western Christian High School in the neighboring town of Hull. While in high school, Kooiker held a job at Hy-Vee's Sheldon and Sioux Center stores. He earned bachelor's degrees in criminal justice and psychology and a master's degree in public administration from the University of South Dakota (USD). During his time at USD, Kooiker continued working for Hy-Vee in Vermillion, South Dakota, and was also an intern at the Sioux City Police Department in his home state of Iowa.

Kooiker and his wife moved to Rapid City in the summer of 1999, where he worked at Gateway Computers for eight years; at the South Dakota Division of Vocational Rehabilitation for about a year; and at Golden West Technologies for six years.

In 2015, Kooiker's father was elected to the Iowa House of Representatives.

== Political career ==
Argus Leader political columnist David Montgomery described Rapid City as an overwhelmingly Republican town where local politics is hotly contested between factions within the Republican Party which Montgomery designates as the "Establishment Party" and the "Outsider Party." Montgomery characterized Kooiker as "the most successful representative" of the more "populist" outsider faction.

Kooiker was named to the Rapid City Planning Commission by then-mayor Jerry Munson in 2001, and served until 2002. He was elected to the Rapid City Common Council later that year and represented Ward 2 until he was elected mayor. As a city council member, Kooiker gained a reputation for being detail-orientated, especially on budget issues. While serving on the council, he was censured publicly in 2010. The 2010 censure was the first public rebuke of an elected official in Rapid City history.

Kooiker had defeated Alan Hanks and incumbent Jim Shaw in the first mayoral election of 2007, but a runoff three weeks later was won by Hanks. The next year, Kooiker applied for the position of city administrator in Cherokee, Iowa, but did not get the job, which instead went to Don Eikmeier. He stayed in Rapid City, and decided to run for mayor again in 2011. Kooiker began his campaign with heavy use of social media, primarily Facebook, and was elected mayor that year by "a wave of overwhelming support in some of the city's poorer precincts," defeating Hanks by 478 votes. Kooiker took office on July 5, 2011. He ran for reelection in 2013, against state senator Mark Kirkeby. Kooiker defeated Kirkeby, by 4,702 votes.

In 2014, Kooiker appointed Lt. Elias Diaz, an officer of Native American and Hispanic heritage, as chief of police. When the appointment met with opposition in the city council, Kooiker appointed Karl Jegaris instead.

Kooiker lost his bid for a third term in June 2015, as former Rapid City police chief Steve Allender won the election by 1,226 votes. Kooiker's second mayoral term ended on July 6, 2015. Cherokee, Iowa mayor Mark Murphy announced Kooiker's hiring as city administrator in October 2015. Kooiker was sworn in on December 22, 2015, though he had begun work earlier that month. In 2017, governor Kim Reynolds named Kooiker to the Iowa Civil Rights Commission.

Kooiker was offered the city manager position in Sheldon, Iowa, in October 2018. Sheldon's city council voted to approve the hiring of Kooiker later that month, and he assumed the office in December 2018, succeeding Sean Hutchinson. Kooiker's resignation as city manager was announced in May 2026 and took effect in August. He was replaced by two interim city managers, city clerk Angela Beckman and public works director Todd Uhl.

== Personal ==
Kooiker married the former Jennifer King in 1999, whose family owned King's Grocery/Pasties in Lead, South Dakota from 1959 to 2000. They are the parents of three daughters, Abbie, Aubrie and Ellie.

Kooiker has cerebral palsy.
