= Warheads (candy) =

Sour candy brand

- Product type: Sour candy
- Current owner: Impact Confections (2004–present)
- Previous owners: The Foreign Candy Company
- Website: www.impactconfections.com/warheads/

Warheads (originally Mega Warheads) is a brand of sour candy owned by Impact Confections. The brand was developed and marketed in the United States by the Foreign Candy Company of Hull, Iowa, and became particularly popular during the 1990s. Impact Confections acquired Warheads from Foreign Candy in 2004.

Warheads are known for their unusually intense sour taste. The original hard candies have an acidic outer coating that produces a strong sour sensation before giving way to the hard candy underneath. The brand's mascot, Wally Warhead, is depicted with puckered lips and a mushroom cloud emerging from his head.

== History ==
=== Development and introduction ===
The Warheads brand was developed by Peter De Yager of the Foreign Candy Company. De Yager had entered the confectionery business by importing gummy candies from Europe and subsequently built Foreign Candy into an importer and developer of novelty confectionery.

According to a 1999 Wired profile, De Yager encountered a Japanese candy called Super Lemon, whose hard candy center was covered with an unusually sour coating. He subsequently traveled through Japan, Korea, Singapore, Thailand and Taiwan while looking for increasingly sour candies. De Yager found the strongest version in Taiwan and contracted a local manufacturer to produce samples in a range of flavors.

De Yager developed the product as Mega Warheads and created Wally Warhead as its mascot, depicting a child with puckered lips and a mushroom cloud emerging from his head. Mega Warheads was in commercial use in the United States by 1992 and became a major success for Foreign Candy during the decade.

=== 1990s popularity ===
Warheads was part of a 1990s trend toward increasingly intense and novelty candies marketed to children. In 1993, The Washington Post cited Mega Warheads as a popular example of the trend, and a 1995 article included Warheads among a group of "shock" candies that were sold partly on their ability to provoke strong reactions.

The candies were particularly popular among children, who traded them and used them in informal contests to see how many they could tolerate at once. A 1997 Los Angeles Times report described Mega Warheads as among the top-selling products at the Sweet Factory retail chain and said that the candy had built up a steady customer base during its first several years on the market. The Washington Post also reported that children traded other snacks for Warheads at summer camp.

By 1999, Wired described Mega Warheads as a "runaway-hit" and reported that De Yager received between 200 and 300 letters about the product each week. De Yager described Warheads as a "$40 million brand". Children also traded flavors, held playground "sour-offs", and competed to see how many candies they could eat at once.

By 1999, Warheads had also been licensed for other products. Good Humor released a Wally Warhead ice cream pop with a sour coating and a Warhead candy center, while Cap Candy planned three Warheads-branded candy toys, including a Wally Warhead Spin Pop.

== Chemistry ==
Warheads Extreme Sour Hard Candy uses citric and malic acids to produce its sour taste. Citric acid provides the initial sour sensation, while malic acid is coated with hydrogenated palm oil, which delays its release and prolongs the sour effect. Ascorbic acid is used as a preservative.

A 2008 review of sour candy and dental erosion reported pH values of 1.6 for Warheads Sour Spray and 2.3 for Warheads Sour Rips Roll. Highly acidic sour candies can contribute to dental erosion and may also irritate the soft tissues of the mouth.

Warheads packaging has carried a warning that eating multiple pieces within a short period may temporarily irritate sensitive tongues and mouths.

== Varieties and flavors ==
Warheads Extreme Sour Hard Candy is sold in five standard flavors: watermelon, blue raspberry, lemon, black cherry, and green apple. In 2016, Impact Confections introduced Warheads Extreme Sour Smashups, in which two flavors were combined in each candy. The assortment consisted of lemon-berry, strawberry-grape, orange-pineapple, mango-melon, and cherry-lime.

The Warheads brand has also been extended beyond hard candy into gummy, chewy, jelly bean, and liquid candy formats. Spicy versions of Warheads have appeared at different points in the brand's history. Hot hard candies were sold in the early 1990s, and in 2017 Impact Confections introduced the HOTHEADS sub-brand with Extreme Heat Worms, combining sour, sweet, and spicy flavors. The HOTHEADS line was discontinued in 2019. In 2025, Impact Confections introduced Warheads Atomic Fizz, a hard candy with a fizzy center, in the five standard Warheads flavors.
