= Western Christian High School (Hull, Iowa) =

Private secondary school in Hull, Iowa, United States

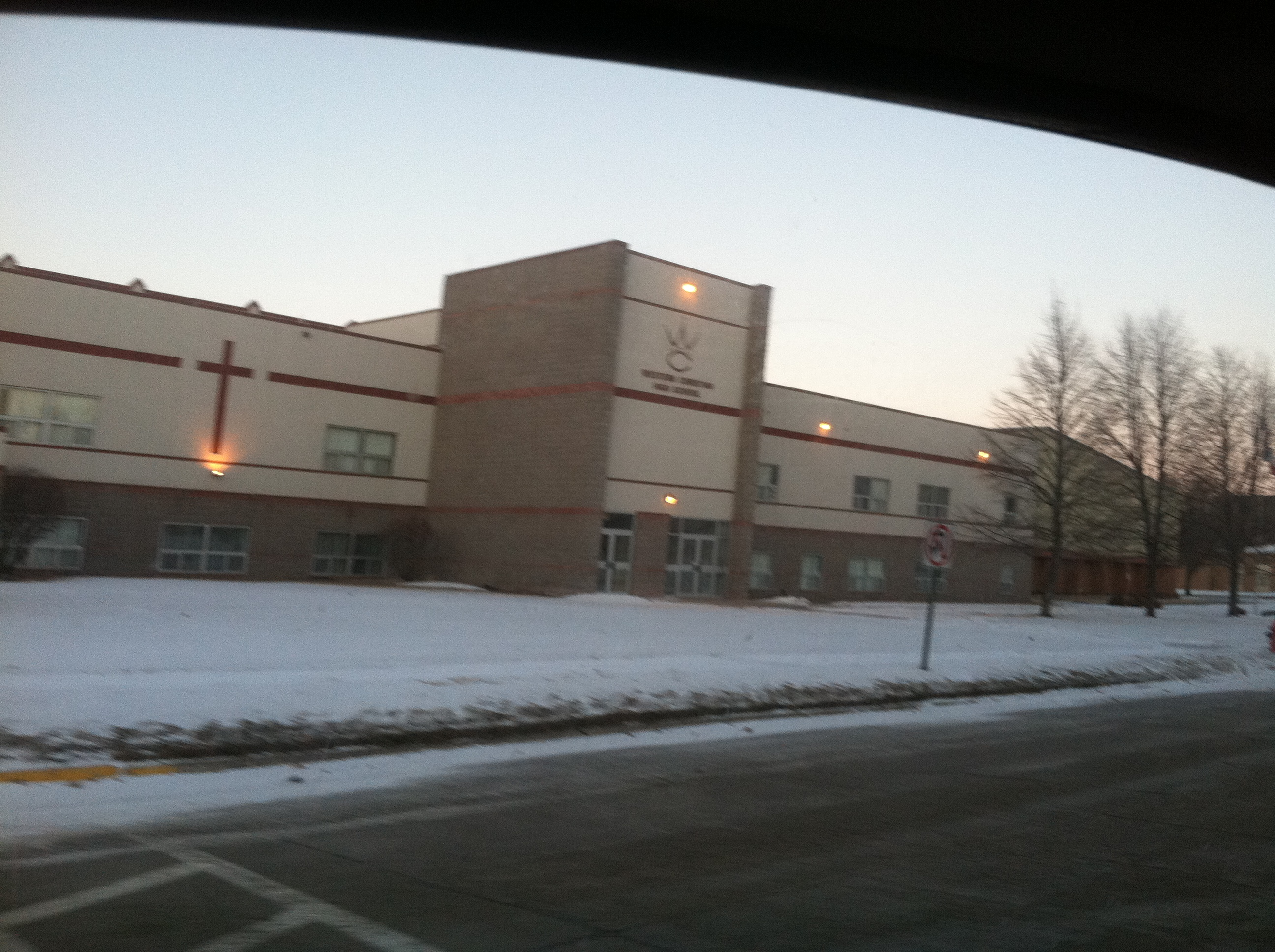

Location
- 925 5th Street; Hull, Iowa 51239; United States; 43.19292°N 96.132656°W

Information
- School type: Private high school
- Motto: Learning...To Serve the King
- Denomination: Reformed
- Established: 1919
- NCES School ID: 00459529
- Head of school: Brian Verwolf
- Grades: 9-12
- Enrollment: 294 (2022-2023)
- Student to teacher ratio: 1:13.4
- Campus type: Rural
- Colors: Maroon; White
- Athletics conference: Siouxland Conference
- Mascot: Wolfpack
- Website: westernchristianhs.com

Western Christian High School (commonly Western Christian, WCHS, or Western) is a private, coeducational, Calvinist private secondary school in Hull, Iowa, United States, serving students in grades 9–12. Western Christian High School is a member of Christian Schools International (CSI). It is one of two private high schools in Hull, along with Trinity Christian High School.

== History ==
Western Academy began in 1919, with grades nine and ten. The name was selected because there was an Eastern Christian Academy in New Jersey at the time, affiliated with the Christian Reformed Church (CRC), and Western Academy was established to educate CRC members that had settled the furthest west. The school was originally located in a three-story house on Hull's Main Street. Prior to housing Western Academy, the building had served as Dorcas Hall, dormitories for the Hull Educational Institute, and as a parsonage for the First Reformed Church in Hull. In 1934 Western Academy went bankrupt due to the Great Depression and was sold to Calvin College. It was then reorganized and reopened as Western Christian High School. The school's first sports teams were known as the Indians. In the mid-1990s, that mascot was dropped and athletics continued without an official team name until the Wolfpack moniker was chosen in 2005.

During the 2017–18 school year, Western Christian began participating in a student exchange program with Greijdanus College.

The school's 100th anniversary, which it celebrated in August 2019, was recognized on the floor of the Iowa General Assembly on March 4, 2020.

== Athletics ==
The boys' basketball team has won eleven state titles (1985, 1991, 1969, 2007, 2008, 2010, 2014, 2016, 2017, 2021, 2024). Former coach Jim Eekhoff is fourth among Iowa men's basketball coaches in wins, with 681. Eekhoff's eight men's championships are a state record, while his eighteen state tournament appearances have tied a state record. The Wolfpack faced Boyden–Hull for the first time since 2005 in the 2021 championship game, and defeated the Comets. The 2021 2A championship game was also the first time in Iowa High School Athletic Association basketball history that two teams from the same city met in the final.

The girls' basketball team has claimed four Class 2A state championships (2012, 2013, 2014, 2017).

The volleyball team has won eighteen state titles (1989, 1993, 1994, 1995, 1998, 2001, 2002, 2003, 2004, 2006, 2007, 2008, 2010, 2015, 2016, 2018, 2019, 2023) and claimed second place in 1999, 2005, 2011 to 2014 and 2024.

The boys' cross country program won team championships four times (1973, 1982, 2003, 2005).

The Wolfpack football team advanced to the state playoffs for the first time in 2015, losing the title game to Regina High School. In 2016, Western defeated Regina to win its first state title in football.

The boys' soccer team won the state championship in 1996 and 2023.

The girls' track and field has won three state championships (1977, 1978, 2013).

=== Facilities ===
Western's first location was in a three-story house on Hull's Main Street, known as "The Mansion." The school building was built in 1924 for $64,000. The first expansion of the 1924 building was completed in 1948, and included a library and science laboratories. In 1957, a gymnasium, locker rooms, a stage, and two classrooms were added for $125,000. In 1964, a space for music was built for $75,000. By 1968, an addition to the science wing was finished for $175,000. A new gymnasium was constructed in 1980 for $900,000. Renovations to the whole building took place from May 1994 to September 1995 for $2 million. A maintenance project in 2006 added a strength and conditioning room, as well as a bus barn to the school, for $1 million. In June 2014, Western Christian received grants from the Minnesota Twins Major League Baseball team and the Modern Woodmen of America for renovations to their baseball and softball fields. New classrooms were added to the building in 2015. The next year, air conditioning was installed and the student commons remolded.

The football and track facilities at A. R. Hesla Field are shared with Boyden–Hull Junior/High School.

== Notable people ==
Alumni

- Randy Feenstra, Iowa state senator and U.S. representative
- John Kooiker, Iowa state representative
- Lee J. Plasier, Iowa state representative
- Sam Kooiker, mayor of Rapid City, South Dakota
- Frederick Manfred, American writer
- Nancy Metcalf, former professional volleyball player, on the US national team from 2000 to 2012.
- Bob Vander Plaats, former Iowa gubernatorial candidate, CEO of The Family Leader
- Nicholas Wolterstorff, American philosopher and theologian

Faculty

- Garritt Roelofs, Iowa state senator, former teacher and principal (Western Academy)

== See also ==
- List of high schools in Iowa
