= Trinity Christian High School (Hull, Iowa) =

Private secondary school in Hull, Iowa, United States

Location
- 1811 Hayes Ave; Hull, (Sioux County), Iowa 51239; United States
- 43.196182°N 96.147760°W

Information
- Type: Private High School
- Religious affiliation: Calvinist (Protestant Reformed Churches in America)
- Opened: 25 August 2008
- Founder: Midwest Society for Protestant Reformed Secondary Education
- NCES School ID: BB120931
- Principal: Jim Regnerus
- Faculty: 6.8 FTE
- Grades: 9-12
- Enrollment: 74 (2022-2023)
- Student to teacher ratio: 11.9
- Colors: Green and White
- Athletics conference: War Eagle Conference
- Mascot: Tiger
- Feeder schools: Hull PRCS, NWIPrs
- Website: www.trinitychs.org

Trinity Christian High School is a private, Calvinist high school affiliated with the Protestant Reformed Churches in America in Hull, Iowa, United States, serving students in grades 9–12. It is one of two Calvinist secondary schools in the city. Western Christian High School is the other. Trinity Christian was founded in 2008, as a successor to Northwest Iowa Protestant Reformed School and secondary school for Hull Protestant Reformed Christian School. The school mascot, chosen in 2012, is the Tiger. The school joined the War Eagle Conference in 2013 and also attained Iowa Board of Education special accreditation that year. A one to one computing initiative began in 2014.

== Athletics ==
The Tigers compete in the following sports in the War Eagle Conference:

- Cross Country
- Volleyball
- Basketball
- Track and Field
- Golf
- Baseball
- Softball
- Robotics

== See also ==
- List of high schools in Iowa
