= Leonard E. Scott =

American politician (1917–1986)

Member of the Iowa House of Representatives from the 4th district
- In office January 13, 1947 – January 9, 1949
- Preceded by: Stephen A. Martin
- Succeeded by: Ted D. Clark

Personal details
- Born: March 25, 1917 Centerville, Iowa, United States
- Died: February 1, 1986 (aged 68) Carson City, Nevada, United States
- Party: Republican

Leonard E. Scott (March 25, 1917 – February 1, 1986) was an American politician and World War II veteran from the state of Iowa.

Scott was born in Centerville, Appanoose County, Iowa in 1917. He graduated from Mystic High School in 1934. Scott served as a Republican for one term in the Iowa House of Representatives from January 13, 1947, to January 9, 1949. He died in Carson City, Nevada in February 1986.

Iowa House of Representatives
| Preceded by Stephen A. Martin | 4th district 1947–1949 | Succeeded by Ted D. Clark |
