= Boyden–Hull Junior/High School =

Public secondary school in Hull, Iowa, United States

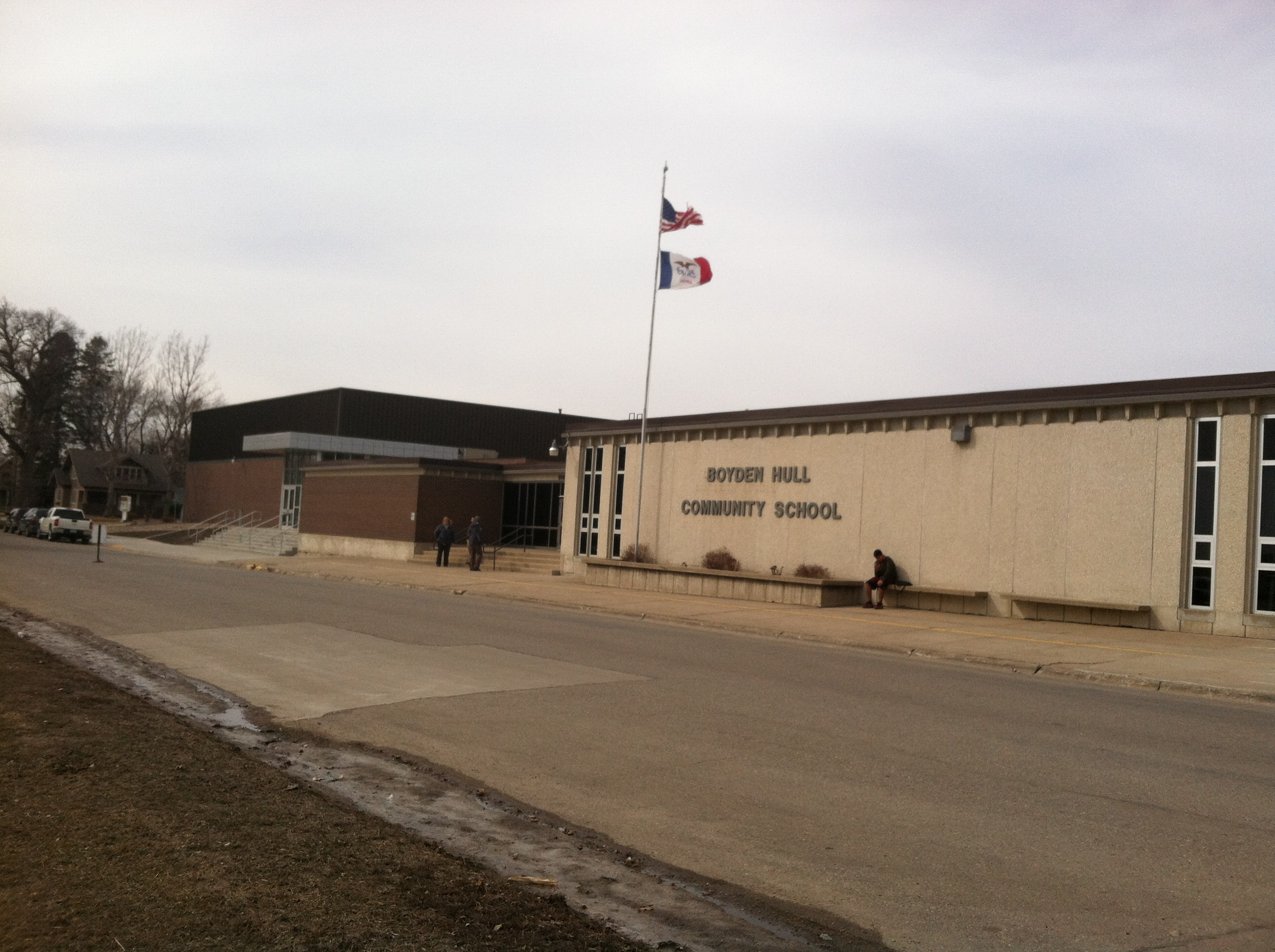

Location
- 801 First Street; Hull, Iowa 51239; United States
- 43°11′22″N 96°8′9″W

Information
- School type: Public
- Motto: Being the Best It Can Be; Community, Empowerment, High Standards, and Innovation
- Opened: August 31, 1959
- School district: Boyden–Hull Community School District
- NCES District ID: 1905190
- Superintendent: Steve Grond
- CEEB code: 162090
- NCES School ID: 190519000167
- Principal: Dan Pottebaum
- Teaching staff: 18.45 (FTE)
- Grades: 7–12
- Enrollment: 272 (2023-2024)
- Student to teacher ratio: 14.74
- Colors: Black and Gold (Comets) Black, Silver and Blue (Nighthawks)
- Fight song: On, Wisconsin! (Comets); Minnesota Rouser (Nighthawks)
- Athletics conference: Siouxland Conference
- Mascot: Comets/Nighthawks
- Website: bhcomets.com/en-US/junior-high-school-f7cdcfb1

Boyden–Hull Junior/High School is the only public middle and high school located in Hull, Iowa, United States. It is a part of the Boyden–Hull Community School District. Their mascot is the Comet. The school's athletic teams compete in the Siouxland Conference. A few sports are shared with Rock Valley High School, a fellow Siouxland Conference member. The combined teams are known as the Nighthawks.

== History ==
The merger that created Boyden–Hull Community School District was approved in a December 1958 vote of the Sioux County board of education. Boyden and Hull were separate school districts until July 1, 1959. The first school board election as a consolidated school district had taken place in March 1959, followed by the first classes on August 31, 1959. Hull High School's student newspaper was called Hull High Lights. Its athletic teams were known as the Wild Cats. Before the merger, Hull's basketball team had been to the state playoffs five times. Boyden Public School's mascot was the Bombers. Boyden's student newspaper was the Buzz Bomb.

=== Technology and services ===
Smart Boards were first installed in 2007. A one to one computing initiative was started in the 2011–12 school year, as was the school's use of Moodle. The district shares some classes with the nearby Rock Valley High School and George–Little Rock Senior High School through polycom videoconferencing technology. Online classes are available for dual high school and college credit though Northwest Iowa Community College (NWICC). A school resource officer was assigned to the district beginning with the 2010 school year. Boyden–Hull and Rock Valley hired a joint transportation director in July 2018. In 2018, Boyden–Hull began a joint vocational education program with the Sioux Center Community School District and NWICC.

=== Facilities ===
A new school building was completed by the 1964–65 school year. Most of the school building was remodeled in the 1980s. The auditorium was renovated in July 2013 and reopened in time for the 2013–14 school year. The gymnasium was refurbished in 2015. A remodeling project worth $11.2 million was approved in February 2018. Additions to the school took place throughout 2018 and 2019.

A vote to acquire land from the city of Hull and Herman Oldenkamp for Boyden–Hull's team sports took place in August 1964. Boyden–Hull's athletic field was named for the consolidated district's first superintendent, A. R. Hesla, in 1974. The football and track facilities there are shared with Western Christian. The concession stand at Hesla Field was rebuilt in summer 2016.

== Extracurricular activities ==
The STORM (Students Teaching Others Role Modeling) Team was organized in the late 1990s. The student organization is mainly active around Red Ribbon Week and also volunteers at the local chapter of the Ronald McDonald House. Boyden–Hull Summer Theatre began in 2009.

=== Athletics ===
==== Comets ====
A men's basketball team by the Boyden–Hull Comets moniker had begun play by the 1960–61 school year. Men's track began by 1961, and baseball by 1963. Boyden–Hull began fielding a football team in 1964. By 1965, the school had joined the Siouxland Conference. The Comet wrestling program started in the 1976–1977 school year.

Boyden–Hull tied West Harrison for a men's state track title in 1970.

The men's basketball team has appeared in the Class A Iowa High School Athletic Association tournament eighteen times since 1971, with titles in 2003, 2012, and 2013. Former coach Paul Walton compiled a 350–130 record over 26 years and was inducted into the Iowa High School Basketball Hall of Fame in 2001. The Comet basketball team made its first appearance in the 2A state tournament in 2019, losing the championship game to North Linn High School. Boyden–Hull faced North Linn for a second time in 2020, defeating the Lynx to win their first 2A championship, and fourth overall. The Comet boys' basketball team faced Western Christian for the first time since 2005 in the 2021 championship game, losing to the Wolfpack. The 2021 2A championship game was also the first time in Iowa High School Athletic Association basketball history that two teams from the same city met in the final.

The Comets won the 2023–2024 boys' golf Class 1A state championship.

==== Shared sports ====
Boyden–Hull continued fielding athletics teams solely under the Comet moniker until the 1980s. Starting that decade, football and baseball were shared with George. Little Rock joined the partnership in 1987, and Boyden–Hull left, electing to combine their football and baseball teams with Rock Valley. In 1990, the official sport-sharing agreement was struck. The combined Boyden–Hull/Rock Valley teams split home games at each school, and the team name was adjusted depending on where the teams played. While in Rock Valley, teams were known as the Rockets, and in Hull, they went by the name Comets. The BHRV collective began by sharing baseball and football, and expanded to softball in 1993, followed by the subsequent merger of the track and field and cross country teams in 1997. In 1999, the BHRV alliance decided on a separate mascot, and have since been known as the Nighthawks. The Boyden–Hull/Rock Valley football team made it to the championship game for the first time in 2009, falling to Solon High School. In their second title game appearance, BHRV defeated Union High School for the 2016 2A championship. Nighthawk football won another district final in 2017, losing to Waukon High School in the semi-finals. In 2018, the Nighthawks returned to the 2A football championship game, losing to Prairie City-Monroe High School.

== Notable alumni ==
- Dwayne Alons, Iowa state representative
- Kevin Alons, Iowa state senator
- Kenneth De Groot, Iowa state representative (Hull High School)
- Lucas DeKoster, Iowa state senator (Hull High School)

== See also ==
- List of high schools in Iowa

Area private schools:

- Western Christian
- Trinity Christian
