= Charles McFatridge =

American politician (1871–1949)

Member of the Iowa House of Representatives from the 4th district
- In office January 11, 1937 – January 8, 1939
- Preceded by: Edmund Hanson
- Succeeded by: Stephen A. Martin

Personal details
- Born: Charles Merritt McFatridge; August 14, 1871 Monroe County, Iowa, United States
- Died: January 1, 1949 (aged 77) Moravia, Iowa, United States
- Party: Democratic

Charles M. McFatridge (August 14, 1871 – January 1, 1949) was an American politician from the state of Iowa.

McFatridge was born in Monroe County, Iowa, in 1871. He served as a Democrat for one term in the Iowa House of Representatives from January 11, 1937, to January 8, 1939. McFatridge died in Moravia, Iowa, in 1949.

Iowa House of Representatives
Preceded by Edmund Hanson	4th district 1937–1939	Succeeded by Stephen A. Martin
