= Rock Valley, Iowa =

- City
- Motto: "Place of opportunities"
- Location of Rock Valley, Iowa
- Coordinates: 43°12′10″N 96°17′23″W
- Country: United States
- State: Iowa
- County: Sioux

Government
  - Type: Mayor-council

Area
  - Total: 4.51 sq mi (11.69 km^{2})
  - Land: 4.46 sq mi (11.55 km^{2})
  - Water: 0.054 sq mi (0.14 km^{2})
- Elevation: 1,257 ft (383 m)

Population (2020)
  - Total: 4,059
  - Density: 910.0/sq mi (351.34/km^{2})
- Time zone: UTC-6 (Central (CST))
  - Summer (DST): UTC-5 (CDT)
- ZIP code: 51247
- Area code: 712
- FIPS code: 19-68205
- GNIS feature ID: 2396403
- Website: City of Rock Valley

Rock Valley is a city in Sioux County, Iowa, the North Western corner of Iowa, United States, along the Rock River. The population was 4,059 at the time of the 2020 census.

== Geography ==
According to the United States Census Bureau, the city has a total area of 3.27 square miles (8.47 km^{2}), of which 3.22 square miles (8.34 km^{2}) is land and 0.05 square miles (0.13 km^{2}) is water.

Rock Valley is located on U.S. Route 18.

== History ==
The town of Rock Valley was platted in 1879 by a Colonel Ira Warren, a Civil War veteran, and the Chicago Milwaukee & St. Paul Railway on ground owned by Warren.

== Education ==
The Rock Valley Community School District Serves the town and the surrounding area.

== Demographics ==
Historical populations
Year	Pop.	±%
1880	100	—
1890	542	+442.0%
1900	1,054	+94.5%
1910	1,198	+13.7%
1920	1,347	+12.4%
1930	1,204	−10.6%
1940	1,507	+25.2%
1950	1,581	+4.9%
1960	1,693	+7.1%
1970	2,205	+30.2%
1980	2,706	+22.7%
1990	2,540	−6.1%
2000	2,702	+6.4%
2010	3,354	+24.1%
2020	4,059	+21.0%
Source:"U.S. Census website". United States Census Bureau. and Iowa Data Center; Source: U.S. Decennial Census

=== 2020 census ===
As of the 2020 census, there were 4,059 people, 1,469 households, and 1,019 families residing in the city. The population density was 910.0 inhabitants per square mile (351.3/km^{2}). There were 1,555 housing units at an average density of 348.6 per square mile (134.6/km^{2}). The median age was 34.3 years. 29.9% of residents were under the age of 18 and 16.3% were 65 years of age or older. 32.3% of residents were under the age of 20; 5.5% were from 20 to 24; 25.9% were from 25 to 44; and 20.0% were from 45 to 64. The gender makeup of the city was 49.6% male and 50.4% female. For every 100 females, there were 98.6 males, and for every 100 females age 18 and over, there were 96.6 males.

0.0% of residents lived in urban areas, while 100.0% lived in rural areas.

Of the 1,469 households, 37.0% had children under the age of 18 living in them. Of all households, 59.8% were married-couple households, 4.5% were cohabitating-couple households, 14.9% were households with a male householder and no spouse or partner present, and 20.8% were households with a female householder and no spouse or partner present. 30.6% of all households were non-families, 26.7% were made up of individuals, and 13.1% had someone living alone who was 65 years of age or older.

Of the 1,555 housing units, 5.5% were vacant. The homeowner vacancy rate was 2.3% and the rental vacancy rate was 10.9%.

Racial composition as of the 2020 census
Race	Number	Percent
White	3,289	81.0%
Black or African American	16	0.4%
American Indian and Alaska Native	15	0.4%
Asian	10	0.2%
Native Hawaiian and Other Pacific Islander	0	0.0%
Some other race	379	9.3%
Two or more races	350	8.6%
Hispanic or Latino (of any race)	870	21.4%

=== 2010 census ===
As of the census of 2010, there were 3,354 people, 1,283 households, and 870 families living in the city. The population density was 1,041.6 inhabitants per square mile (402.2/km^{2}). There were 1,356 housing units at an average density of 421.1 per square mile (162.6/km^{2}). The racial makeup of the city was 92.2% White, 0.3% African American, 0.4% Asian, 5.8% from other races, and 1.2% from two or more races. Hispanic or Latino of any race were 12.2% of the population.

There were 1,283 households, of which 32.9% had children under the age of 18 living with them, 60.9% were married couples living together, 4.2% had a female householder with no husband present, 2.7% had a male householder with no wife present, and 32.2% were non-families. 28.8% of all households were made up of individuals, and 13.5% had someone living alone who was 65 years of age or older. The average household size was 2.54 and the average family size was 3.16.

The median age in the city was 35.8 years. 27.3% of residents were under the age of 18; 8.1% were between the ages of 18 and 24; 25.3% were from 25 to 44; 19.4% were from 45 to 64; and 19.9% were 65 years of age or older. The gender makeup of the city was 49.4% male and 50.6% female.

=== 2000 census ===
As of the census of 2000, there were 2,702 people, 1,124 households, and 750 families living in the city. The population density was 1,599.9 inhabitants per square mile (617.7/km^{2}). There were 1,202 housing units at an average density of 711.7 per square mile (274.8/km^{2}). The racial makeup of the city was 98.48% White, 0.11% African American, 0.07% Native American, 0.33% Asian, 0.59% from other races, and 0.41% from two or more races. Hispanic or Latino of any race were 1.04% of the population.

There were 1,124 households, out of which 29.4% had children under the age of 18 living with them, 59.8% were married couples living together, 5.2% had a female householder with no husband present, and 33.2% were non-families. 30.9% of all households were made up of individuals, and 16.5% had someone living alone who was 65 years of age or older. The average household size was 2.38 and the average family size was 3.00.

In the city, the population was spread out, with 25.4% under the age of 18, 9.6% from 18 to 24, 24.4% from 25 to 44, 18.3% from 45 to 64, and 22.3% who were 65 years of age or older. The median age was 38 years. For every 100 females, there were 92.6 males. For every 100 females age 18 and over, there were 89.8 males.

The median income for a household in the city was $36,967, and the median income for a family was $45,074. Males had a median income of $31,219 versus $20,833 for females. The per capita income for the city was $19,660. About 1.9% of families and 4.1% of the population were below the poverty line, including 6.7% of those under age 18 and 3.2% of those age 65 or over.

== Notable people ==
- Florence Fallgatter, home economist, was born in Rock Valley.
- James Francis Macbride, botanist, was born in Rock Valley.
- Stephen A. Mitchell (politician), was born in Rock Valley.
- Richard Mulder (1938–2022), physician and Minnesota state legislator was born in Rock Valley.
- Katy Olson, politician, was born in Rock Valley.
- Andrew Van Ginkel, football player, was born in Rock Valley
