= Boyden–Hull Community School District =

School district in Lyon and Sioux Counties, Iowa, United States

Address
- 801 First Street Hull, (Sioux County), Iowa, 51239; United States
- Coordinates: 43°11′22″N 96°8′9″W

District information
- Type: Public
- Grades: PreK–12
- Established: July 1, 1959; 66 years ago
- Superintendent: Steve Grond
- Accreditation: Iowa Department of Education
- Schools: 2
- Budget: $10,598,000 (2020-21)
- NCES District ID: 1905190

Students and staff
- Students: 630 (2022-23)
- Teachers: 48.18 FTE
- Staff: 47.76 FTE
- Student–teacher ratio: 13.08
- Athletic conference: Siouxland Conference
- District mascot: Comets
- Colors: Black and gold

Other information
- Website: bhcomets.com

Boyden–Hull Community School District is a rural public school district headquartered in Hull, Iowa.

Most of the district is in Sioux County while a portion is in Lyon County and serves the cities of Boyden and Hull, and the surrounding rural area.

It operates Boyden–Hull Elementary School in Boyden, and Boyden–Hull Junior/High School in Hull, which houses the district's headquarters.

== History ==
The first students graduated from Hull High School, within the Hull Public School system, in 1891. In 1915, John Torrance McRuer was reelected superintendent of Hull Public Schools. The institution offered kindergarten and primary school, as well. A successor of McRuer's, F. J. Stamper, took on the role, then was replaced by W. A. May for the 1924–1925 school year. Stamper returned in 1925, and resigned in 1926 due to illness. Stamper's duties were assumed by Leslie Walpole. Stamper returned to his post in September 1929 and died in December. T. F. Strayer then became superintendent, followed by W. A. May, before Robert Gosselink assumed the role in 1932. Gosselink remained through the 1930s and into the 1940s. B. G. Tye was elected Hull's superintendent in 1947. Shortly thereafter, Carl Gaumer replaced him and served until 1950.

Harry Raumbaugh, who taught in Hull, was the principal and later superintendent of Boyden Public Schools. After the end of his World War I military service, Scott Crosswait served as superintendent of Boyden Public School for three years. W. E. Sturdevant was superintendent for the 1921–22 school year. Sturdevant's successor Henry Hoeven was elected to several terms as superintendent, then replaced by James Hoeven, who resigned in 1929. James Hoeven was replaced by R. B. Edwards in a March 1929 vote of the Boyden school board. Elmer Lack moved to Boyden in 1932, after he was elected superintendent of schools. Lack remained in the post until 1938, when Fred Brusha was selected. John Brouwer served as Boyden's superintendent between 1942 and 1947. G. J. Vanden Berg succeeded Brouwer, and served through 1952. In 1953, Earl Hall was elected superintendent of Boyden Public School. After Hall resigned the position in June 1957, Dale Moen assumed the duties.

The merged Boyden–Hull School District was approved in a December 1958 vote of the Sioux County board of education. At time of the merger, Sioux County superintendent of schools was W. K. Price. The first school board election as a consolidated school district took place in March 1959. Boyden and Hull remained separate school districts until July 1, 1959.

A. R. Hesla, who became superintendent of Hull Public School in 1950, remained in that role through the merger into Boyden–Hull Community School District, and resigned the position in 1973. Dave Curry was superintendent of schools between 1974 and 1976. A merger with George Community School District was discussed throughout 1976. Craig Anderson replaced Curry at the end of the 1975–1976 school year and served through the 1990s. Anderson was succeeded by Dennis Ohde who served from 2000 to 2004. Steve Grond was named superintendent in 2005. From the 2020–21 school year, Grond concurrently served as superintendent of West Sioux Community School District. Grond returned to Boyden–Hull on a full-time basis in the 2026–27 school year.

== See also ==
- List of school districts in Iowa
