= Ralph Klemme =

American politician (1939–2024)

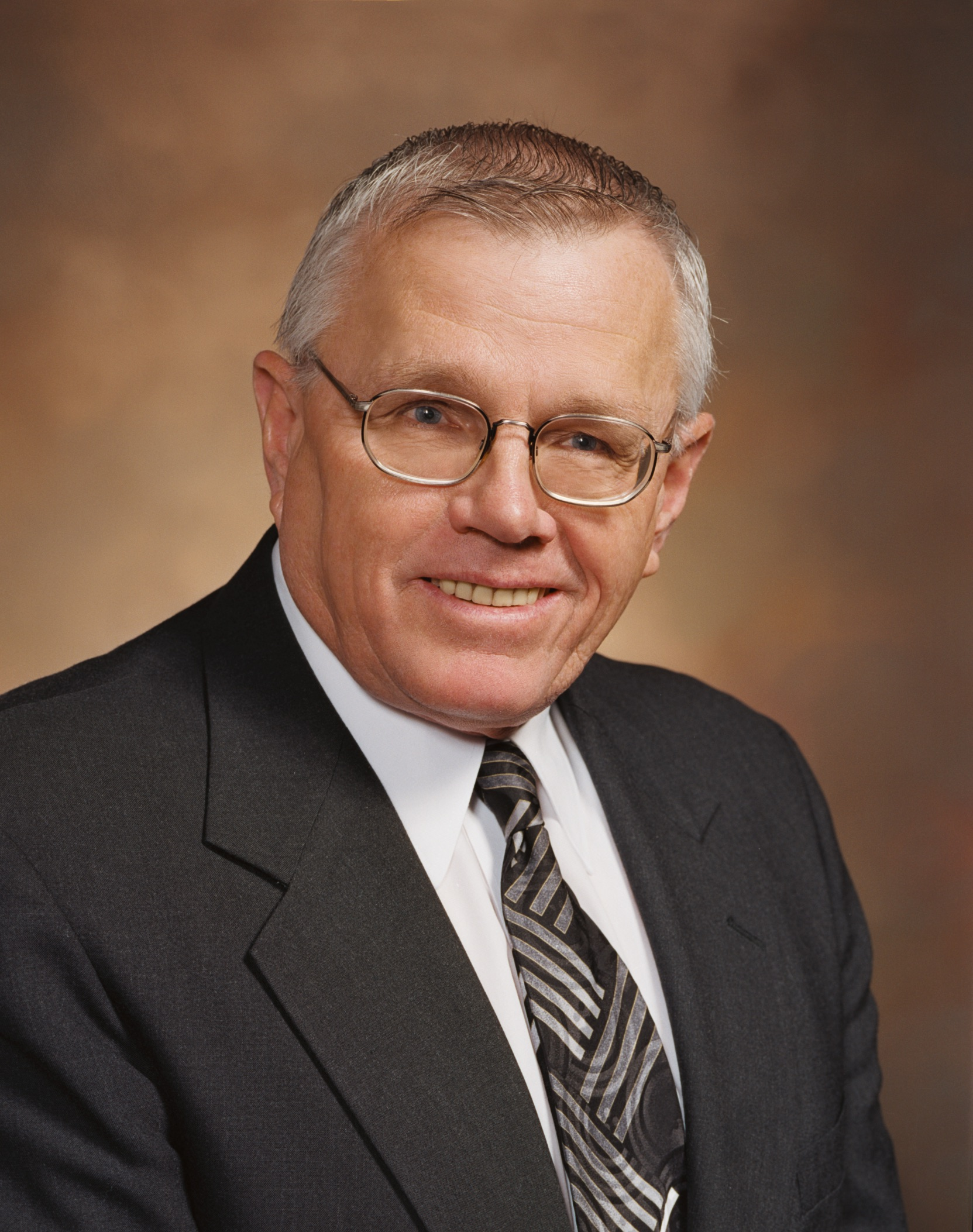

Member of the Iowa House of Representatives from the 3rd district
- In office January 3, 2003 – January 9, 2005
- Preceded by: Christopher Rants
- Succeeded by: Chuck Soderberg

Member of the Iowa House of Representatives from the 4th district
- In office January 11, 1993 – January 12, 2003
- Preceded by: Wayne D. Bennett
- Succeeded by: Dwayne Alons

Personal details
- Born: November 17, 1939 Plymouth County, Iowa, U.S.
- Died: December 17, 2024 (aged 85) Le Mars, Iowa, U.S.
- Party: Republican
- Spouse: Karen
- Children: Three
- Occupation: Farmer

Ralph Fred Klemme (November 17, 1939 – December 17, 2024) was an American politician, grain and livestock farmer.

== Life and career ==
Born in Plymouth County, Iowa, Klemme graduated from Le Mars, Iowa Community High School and served in the Iowa National Guard. Klemme was a grain and livestock farmer. He served on the Le Mars Community School Board. From 1993 to 2005, Klemme served in the Iowa House of Representatives as a Republican.

Klemme died from cancer in Le Mars, Iowa, on December 17, 2024, at the age of 85.
