= Rock Valley Community School District =

Public school district located in Rock Valley, Iowa, United States

Coordinates: 43.208329°N 96.287613°W

Location
- Rock Valley, Iowa Lyon County and Sioux County United States
- Coordinates: 43.208329, -96.287613

District information
- Type: Local school district
- Grades: K-12
- Superintendent: Chad Janzen
- Schools: 3
- Budget: $14,368,000 (2020-21)
- NCES District ID: 1924660

Students and staff
- Students: 976 (2022-23)
- Teachers: 69.16 FTE
- Staff: 63.65 FTE
- Student–teacher ratio: 14.11
- Athletic conference: Siouxland
- District mascot: Rockets
- Colors: Orange and Black

Other information
- Website: rvcsd.net

Rock Valley Community School District is a rural public school district headquartered in Rock Valley, Iowa. The district is mostly within Sioux County, with a small area in Lyon County, and serves the town of Rock Valley and the surrounding rural areas.

== Schools ==
The district operates three schools in a single building at 1712 20th Ave in Rock Valley:

- Rock Valley High School
- Rock Valley Middle School
- Rock Valley Elementary School

=== Rock Valley High School ===
==== Athletics ====
The Rockets are members of the Siouxland Conference, and participate in the following sports:

- Football
  - 2016 Class 2A State Champions (as Boyden–Hull-Rock Valley)
- Cross Country
- Volleyball
- Basketball
  - Boys' 4-time Class 1A State Champions (1996, 1998, 2009, 2010), 2022 Class 2A State Champions.
  - Girls' 4-time State Champions (2001, 2002, 2003, 2026)
- Wrestling
- Golf
  - Boys' 4-time Class 1A State Champions (1979, 1988, 1992, 1993)
- Track and Field
- Baseball
  - 1951 State Champions
- Softball

== See also ==
- List of school districts in Iowa
- List of high schools in Iowa
