= Gene Lyle Hoffman =

American politician

Member of the Iowa Senate from the 3rd district
- In office January 14, 1957 – January 8, 1961
- Preceded by: Ted D. Clark
- Succeeded by: Joe N. Wilson

Personal details
- Born: Gene Lyle Hoffman; September 8, 1912 Lamoni, Iowa, United States
- Died: October 10, 1998 (aged 86) Lamoni, Iowa, United States
- Party: Democratic

Gene Lyle Hoffman (September 8, 1912 – October 10, 1998) was an American politician and World War II veteran from the state of Iowa.

Hoffman was born in Lamoni, Iowa in 1912. He received his education in Lamoni. Hoffman served as a Democrat in the Iowa Senate from 1957 to 1961. He died in 1998.

Iowa Senate
Preceded by Ted D. Clark	3rd district 1957–1961	Succeeded by Joe N. Wilson
