= Wilmon Newell =

American entomologist

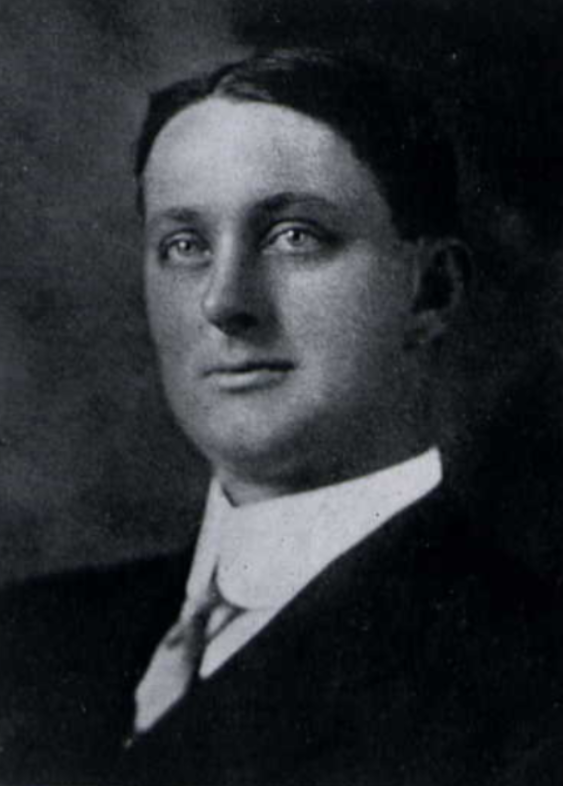
- Born: March 4, 1878; Hull, Iowa, United States
- Died: October 25, 1943 (aged 65); Gainesville, Florida, United States
- Education: Iowa State University

Wilmon Newell (4 March 1878 – 25 October 1943) was an American entomologist. He was the first Plant Commissioner for the Florida State Plant Board and headed the University of Florida’s College of Agriculture. He was involved in early work on the control of citrus canker and the Mediterranean fruit fly in Florida.

== Life and work ==
Newell was born in Hull, Iowa and received his bachelor's (1897) and master's (1898) degrees from Iowa State University, along with an honorary doctorate in 1920. From 1897 to 1899 he worked at the Iowa Agricultural Experiment Station and from 1899 to 1902 at the Ohio Experimental Station. He then became associate entomologist and apiarist at Texas. In 1903, he was named State Entomologist of Georgia. In 1904, he served as Secretary of the Louisiana Crop Pest Commission, where he is credited for making important discoveries controlling the cotton boll weevil using powdered lead arsenate. In 1910, Newell became state entomologist in Texas for five years. After the Florida legislature approved the Plant Act, Newell became the first Plant Commissioner for the Florida State Plant Board, where he directed a successful campaign to eradicate citrus canker. Newell also helped to establish the Florida Entomological Society.

In 1921, Newell was selected to run the University of Florida’s College of Agriculture, serving as the dean, as well as director of its Experiment Station and Cooperative Extension Service. He also headed the USDA’s eradication campaign against the Mediterranean Fruit Fly in Florida in 1929. He held the title of Provost of Agriculture from 1938 until his death in October 1943. His research areas included control methods or the cotton boll weevil, Argentine ant, and American foul brood in honeybees.

He helped control citrus canker by a large scale eradication of all infected trees. His approach to control invasive insects and diseases has been criticized as a "scorched earth" approach, eliminating pests without regard to the environment or to economic losses to growers.

He was a member of the advisory council of the Southern Forestry Service, member and president in 1920 of the American Association of Economic Entomologists. He was a charter member of the cotton states branch of the association, president of the Association of Southern Agricultural Workers in 1929, the University of Florida Representative to the Institute for Research in Tropical America, a member of the Soil Science Society, Administrator of the Florida State Soil Conservation, chairman of Florida Land-Use Planning Committee, chairman of the Advisory Committee on Agriculture, and the Florida Defense Council.

Newell married Helen Mabee in 1907. He died in Gainesville, Florida. He was a fellow of the American Association for the Advancement of Sciences. The "Newell" variety of Bermuda grass was named after him. He was inducted into the Florida Citrus Hall of Fame in 1966.
