= Charles MacFetridge =

Irish Archdeacon of Ross from 1904 until 1925

Charles MacFetridge was Archdeacon of Ross, Ireland, from 1904 until 1925.

He was educated at Trinity College, Dublin and ordained in 1870. After curacies in Cork and Kinsale, he was the incumbent at Kilgarriff, County Cork, from 1874 to 1925.
