= Kevin Alons =

American politician (born 1968)

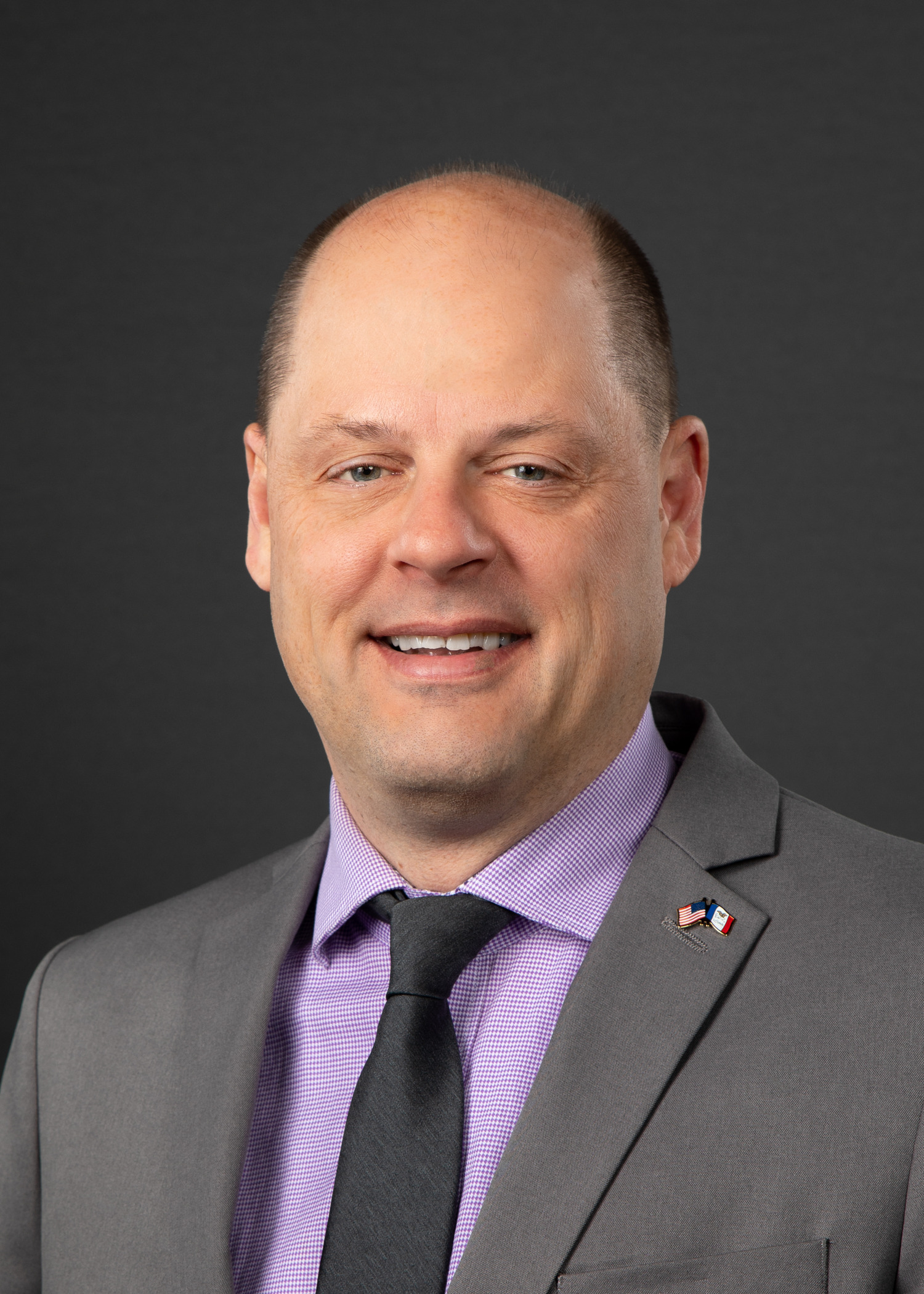

Member of the Iowa Senate from the 7th district
- Incumbent
- Assumed office January 9, 2023
- Preceded by: Jackie Smith

Personal details
- Born: 1968 (age 57–58) Gregory, South Dakota, U.S.
- Party: Republican
- Parent: Dwayne Alons (father)
- Education: Northwestern College (BA); Webster University (MS)
- Occupation: software developer

Military service
- Allegiance: United States
- Branch/service: Iowa Air National Guard
- Rank: Colonel

Kevin Alons (born 1968) is an American politician. Before contesting the 2022 Iowa Senate election, Alons served in the Iowa Air National Guard.

== Early life and career ==
Kevin Alons is one of four children of Dwayne Alons and his wife Clarice. Born in Gregory, South Dakota, in 1968, Alons was raised near Boyden, Iowa, and graduated from Boyden–Hull High School before attending Northwestern College. Alons had a 27-year career in the military, attaining the rank of colonel in the Iowa Air National Guard. He moved to Salix, where he became associated with the eponymous Alons Software as a software developer and consultant, and has also worked as an architect.

Alons is married to Ngu.

== Political career ==
Alons served a single term as treasurer of the Republican Party branch in Woodbury County, and later became county party chair. He first led Woodbury County Republicans from November 2006 to 2009, was succeeded by Brian Rosener, and replaced Rosener in February 2015. Alons resigned the position in May 2018, and Suzan Stewart took on the role. On the advice of Jim Carlin, Alons began his campaign for District 7 of the Iowa Senate in December 2021. He won the November 2022 general election unopposed, replacing redistricted Democratic Senator Jackie Smith.

Iowa Senate
Preceded by Jackie Smith	9th District; 2023 – present	Succeeded by Incumbent
