= Dwayne Alons =

American politician (1946–2014)

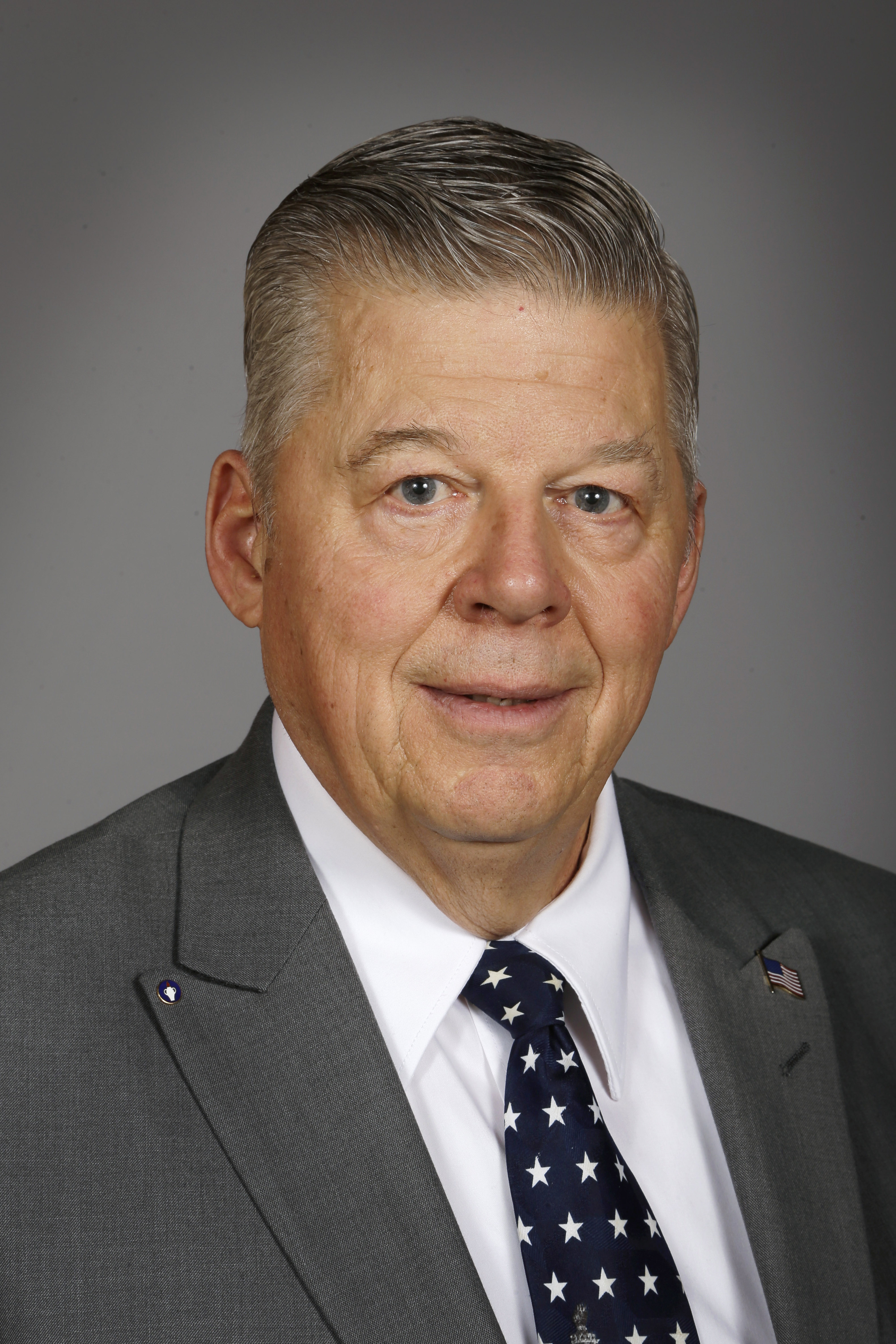

Member of the Iowa House of Representatives from the 4th district
- In office January 13, 2003 – November 29, 2014
- Preceded by: Ralph Klemme
- Succeeded by: John Kooiker

Member of the Iowa House of Representatives from the 5th district
- In office January 11, 1999 – January 12, 2003
- Preceded by: Kenneth Veenstra
- Succeeded by: Royd Chambers

Personal details
- Born: Dwayne Arlan Alons; October 30, 1946 Hull, Iowa, U.S.
- Died: November 29, 2014 (aged 68) Sioux Center, Iowa, U.S.
- Party: Republican
- Spouse: Clarice (m. 1967–2014)
- Children: Kevin, Kyle, Kristin, Karena
- Education: Northwestern College, University of Arkansas, Army War College
- Occupation: Politician, Farmer
- Website: Alons's website

Military service
- Allegiance: United States
- Branch/service: Iowa Air National Guard
- Rank: Brigadier general (retired)

Dwayne Arlan Alons (October 30, 1946 – November 29, 2014) was an American politician. A Republican, he sat in the Iowa House of Representatives from 1999 to 2014, representing the 5th district until 2003, and the 4th district thereafter. He was a brigadier general in the Iowa Air National Guard and served as chief of staff at its headquarters. Alons died of cancer on November 29, 2014. He was succeeded in office by John Kooiker.

== Education ==
Dwayne Alons was one of four siblings born to Gerrit Alons and Hattie Alons, née Tensen. Alons graduated from Boyden–Hull High School in 1964. He earned a B.S. degree in mathematics from Northwestern College in Orange City, Iowa, in 1968, his M.S. degree in management from the University of Arkansas in Fayetteville, Arkansas, in 1974, graduated from the Air Command and Staff College correspondence program in 1984, completed the National Security Management Course in 1987, and graduated from the Army War College 1990.

== Military service ==
Alons was the chief of staff at the Iowa Air National Guard Headquarters. He was responsible for ensuring that units of the Iowa Air National Guard are organized, staffed, equipped, trained, and ready to accomplish their assigned state and federal missions. He served as principal advisor to the Assistant Adjutant General on matters pertaining to Guard. Alons' military career began in 1969, when he received a commission through Officer Training School. He served as a command pilot, with more than 3,860 flying hours in the F-4, F-100, A-7, and F-16.

== Legislative career ==
As of January 2013, Alons served on several committees in the Iowa House – the Agriculture, Economic Growth, and Judiciary Committees. He also served as the chair of the Veterans Affairs committee and as a member of the Transportation, Infrastructure, and Capitals Appropriations Subcommittee.

Alons died in office on November 29, 2014, of cancer.

== Electoral history ==
*incumbent

5th District contests

Election	Political result	Candidate	Party	Votes	%
Iowa House of Representatives primary elections, 1998; District 5 Turnout: 4,086	Republican	Dwayne Alons	Republican	2,193	53.67%
Iowa House of Representatives primary elections, 1998; District 5 Turnout: 4,086	Republican	Benjamin Van Engelenhoven	Republican	1,891	46.28%
Iowa House of Representatives general elections, 1998; District 5	Republican hold	Dwayne Alons	Republican	unopposed	
Iowa House of Representatives primary elections, 2000; District 5	Republican	Dwayne Alons*	Republican	unopposed	
Iowa House of Representatives general elections, 2000; District 5	Republican hold	Dwayne Alons*	Republican	unopposed	

Early 4th District contests

Election	Political result	Candidate	Party	Votes	%
Iowa House of Representatives primary elections, 2002; District 4	Republican	Dwayne Alons*	Republican	unopposed	
Iowa House of Representatives general elections, 2002; District 4	Republican (newly redistricted)	Dwayne Alons*	Republican	unopposed	
Iowa House of Representatives primary elections, 2004; District 4	Republican	Dwayne Alons*	Republican	unopposed	
Iowa House of Representatives general elections, 2004; District 4	Republican hold	Dwayne Alons*	Republican	unopposed	
Iowa House of Representatives primary elections, 2006; District 4	Republican	Dwayne Alons*	Republican	unopposed	
Iowa House of Representatives general elections, 2006; District 4	Republican hold	Dwayne Alons*	Republican	unopposed	
Iowa House of Representatives primary elections, 2008; District 4	Republican	Dwayne Alons*	Republican	unopposed	
Iowa House of Representatives general elections, 2008; District 4 Turnout: 15,546	Republican hold	Dwayne Alons*	Republican	12,345	79.41%
Iowa House of Representatives general elections, 2008; District 4 Turnout: 15,546	Republican hold	James Van Bruggen	Democratic	2,693	17.32%

Election	Political result	Candidate	Party	Votes	%
Iowa House of Representatives primary elections, 2010; District 4	Republican	Dwayne Alons*	Republican	unopposed	
Iowa House of Representatives general elections, 2010; District 4	Republican hold	Dwayne Alons*	Republican	unopposed	
Iowa House of Representatives primary elections, 2012; District 4	Republican	Dwayne Alons*	Republican	unopposed	
Iowa House of Representatives general elections, 2012; District 4	Republican (newly redistricted)	Dwayne Alons*	Republican	unopposed	

Iowa House of Representatives
Preceded by Kenneth Veenstra	5th District; 1999–2003	Succeeded by Royd Chambers
Preceded by Ralph Klemme	4th District; 2003–2014	Succeeded by John Kooiker
