= One-to-one computing =

In the context of education, one-to-one computing (sometimes abbreviated as "1:1") refers to academic institutions, such as schools or colleges, that allow each enrolled student to use an electronic device in order to access the Internet, digital course materials, and digital textbooks. The concept has been actively explored and sporadically implemented since the late 1990s. One-to-one computing used to be contrasted with a policy of "bring your own device" (BYOD), which encourages or requires students to use their own laptops, smartphones or other electronic devices in class. The distinction between BYOD and school-issued devices became blurred when many schools started recommending devices for parents to buy (examples for both iPads and Chromebooks being used 1:1 in schools, but being paid for by parents exist, there may be similar evidence for other devices). The term 1:1 computing in education is now redefined to a situation where students have access to a device per individual that is used in the teaching as a tool for learning. Historically, the programs have centered around the following devices:

- Laptops (Windows and Mac) 1990s-2010.
- iPads (with some competing Android and Windows devices) 2010-2014
- Chromebooks (2015–present) (with iPad+keyboard and other laptop & tablet-computers competing).

== Levels ==
The level of education will influence the type of adoption, through factors such as: user-readiness, budget, expected merits, and cost-benefits.

- For young students, iPads and competing devices remain very popular, but they are not always 1:1. Many more affluent schools provide each of their students with an iPad to use throughout the school year.
- For students that need to type more, Chromebooks are the most common. Middle and High Schools and, to some extent, colleges have been customers for Chromebooks.
- For mature/adult students in higher education, the BYOD approach is most employed. Institutions provide WiFi and web-based LMS access. However, Chromebooks can be found in many libraries.

== Benefits ==
Before cloud-computing the main benefits referred to access to devices. As cloud-computing progressed collaboration, cost reduction, going paperless, 21st century skills became more of a focus. Red research included 1:1 and collaboration in its key research findings. One-to-one computing offers the benefits of equal access, standardization, easy upgrades, simple networking and the ability to monitor student progress and online behavior. For these reasons, one-to-one computing is a major part of education policy in many countries. These benefits also underlie the one-to-one model of One Laptop per Child (OLPC), a charity that aims to issue electronic devices to millions of children in the developing world. With the growth of the internet-connectivity the possibility to use cloud-computing to transfer the data and administration from the devices to cloud-computing has removed the necessity of much of the tech support from the teacher.

In the laptop era the laptops were often used as add-ons to the established teaching. Their limited use reinforced the doubts about their educational value and whether the high maintenance costs were worth the investment. According to research published by Boston College, the educational value of 1:1 in the laptop era depended on the classroom teacher. Some schools have even phased out their one-to-one programs because there was no evidence of academic gains according to the 2007 article. (Though: Please note that the district noted in the article went for a 1:1 Chromebook initiative in April 2017 )

Other studies have shown some progress in specific subjects, especially in writing scores, that are correlated with the use of school-issued laptops. The wide range of results for 1:1 programs means there is no consensus on their benefits or drawbacks.

The iPad era saw increased uptake of iPads (and comparable tablets) in schools and consequently increased 1:1 programs in schools. More and more education specific applications and tools became available as increasing research about educational value and implementation methodologies of 1:1 programs were published.

The popularity was based on their touchscreens, good battery life and the availability of applications as well as their general brand-related image and comparative ease of use compared to Laptops/Desktops.

The Chromebook era had several major success-factors (several of which were often also used in iPad 1:1 schools).

1. Very portable: small laptops, lightweight.
2. auto-updating devices. Reducing the need for device management and the need to wait while updating.
3. Quick start-up/ almost instantaneous wake-up from sleep.
4. Battery life (lasted a good school-day)
5. Truly device independent. Backed-up files & configuration available anytime, anyplace, anywhere. This allowed distribution of educational content. It also allowed keeping stock of spare-chromebooks available. If a student logged in with his/her account it worked flawlessly. iPads and PCs kept much configuration information on devices making quick swaps hard or impossible.
6. Availability of general productivity software that was cloud-based. This allowed note-taking, going paperless.
7. Low cost (compared to iPads and Laptops) both for purchase, and running costs/maintenance (i.e. Cost of Ownership).
8. Increased attention to professional development and to embedding 1:1 use in the teaching of different subjects.
9. Increased involvement of stakeholders like parents and school-boards because of the costs of WiFi, the increased tendency to use the devices at home and the increased awareness of processes for repairs, insurances, temporary replacement etc.
10. Increased use in assessment and tests.
11. Increased collaboration, self-directed learning, inquiry based learning

Because 1:1 computing programs may have many goals, from improving educational outcomes to increasing equality, and are associated with such a wide range of teaching methods, it is also difficult to judge their overall success or value. One notable benefit that has been documented and researched is the potential for 1:1 computing initiatives to support the use of open educational resources (OER), available in digital form, for ubiquitous access by learners.

== Disadvantages ==
Disadvantages of 1:1 are controversial, but there are general objections at increasing "screen-time" when the private lives of children also see significant screen-time. There may be psychological and / or physical disadvantages as there are with any technology, including the ones replaced (paper, paint, carrying more books).

Device addiction in children is a concern that has been studied, with controversial results. There can also be objection against possible effect of exposure to radiation from the screens and WiFi. As stated under advantages there is no general consensus on the scientific evidence on efficacy. In a field as new as 1:1 with the technology used having undergone major changes it may take time for clear patterns to emerge and be agreed on.

The cost itself may be a disadvantage. Schools and districts in areas with low incomes and high rates of homelessness have argued that Chromebook programs compare positively to paper for homework return-rates. Other disadvantages may be related to the sustainability of infrastructure. Currently the cost of the sum of all replacement parts for one Chromebook exceeds the cost of a Chromebook gained through a school districts bulk discount. This has resulted in school districts transitioning from a traditional repair model to treating Chromebooks as a disposable device. Another disadvantage is the need to future proof reliability. Up until recently, and prior to improvements in battery technology, laptops mainly served as non portable devices. Many component issues such as battery and cabling issues related to laptops have trickled down into the Chromebook model. This is an issue due to Chromebooks typically being distributed in far greater numbers. This risks an interruption to instruction that needs to be overcome.

== Costs ==
One-to-one requires substantial institutional investment. In addition to the cost of purchasing devices, the Cost-of-Ownership is not insignificant and can include connectivity/WiFi, charging-facilities/caddys, implementation, training, software licensing, monitoring, security, upgrades and maintenance. Therefore, the overall cost–benefit ratio of a one-to-one model is not clear. Aside from the technical costs the changing of the teaching itself is labour-intensive and may require professional development, licensing, re-writing materials, re-designing lesson plans.

Several methodologies exist to make sure all stakeholders are involved and the adoption/implementation is done responsibly. For example, the Natick (MA) Public Schools 1:1 Program has the "Red" Logo indicating it is a Project Red Signature District indicating they followed the Red methodology, as well as an Apple Distinguished District logo (competitors like Google and Microsoft have their own recognition programs). If one looks at the documents they increased their numbers of Chromebooks and have mature planning processes including cooperation with Boston College research.

As the cost of internet services and data charges fall WIFI speeds and accessibility has increased to the point that it is no longer a limiting factor for users of Chromebooks and other devices used for education.

== Recent developments ==
The USA based Chromebook programs may have shown changes in the economics of 1:1 programs. Although 1:1 programs require better WiFi than previous programs, they use ChromeOS which automatically updates and patches in the background (lowering the maintenance costs). The purchasing prices of Chromebooks were substantially lower than competing devices. According to IDC research the maintenance costs were significantly lower. Since the batteries of Chromebooks easily last a full day, schools experimented with having students charge them at home and only keeping a replacement stock ready in school (for defective, forgotten and out-of-charge Chromebooks) reducing the need for charging equipment/trolleys. GAM (Google Accounts Management) did charge for licensing, but it could remove the necessity of other MDM (Mobile Device Management) solutions and other security solutions at lower than Web-authentication level. Some schools also experimented with parents owning the devices (and paying for them). Having less costly equipment on site may also have saved in insurance and rooms may have become available for other purposes. 1:1 also enabled going paperless (i.e. publishers supplied cheaper digital versions of teaching materials) and reducing the cost on paper/printers used. No serious study is known of this, at this point. But individual schools have published costs and savings. The use of Google-Classroom software and G suite in general was instrumental in going paperless. It allowed electronic hand-in, grading and returning of projects to groups of students. Microsoft is trying to copy the classroom functionality in their O365 for education.

== Uruguay's 2007 Project Ceibal ==
Between 2007 and 2016, Project Ceibal was the most successful 1:1 program in the world. It included the right to internet connectivity in school as well as at home besides the right to have a computer "Since its implementation, every child who enters the public education system in any part of the country is given a computer for personal use with free Internet connection at school. In addition, Plan Ceibal provides programs, educational resources and teacher training courses that transform the ways of teaching and learning.". The 2007 decree specified in it desired outcomes "1.2.3. EXPECTED RESULTS: Have covered 100% of children of school age within a period of 3 years with an Internet connection in their Schools as in their homes." By 2009 all 300.000 students were equipped with hardware and all schools had WiFi. By 2013 use of Google-drive and apps were added to CREA and By 2015 95% of urban schools had fibre-optic connections. By 2016 Chromebooks were added to the available hardware. Since the original hardware was Fedora based Uruguay has held the top-spot of Linux uptake for years, according to statcounter.

== Recent mass uptake in American schools ==
1:1 Programs in US schools have gained serious momentum somewhere around 2016/2017. In February 2017, edtechmagazine reported more than 50% of teachers reported using 1:1 computing. In March 2017 Futuresource reported Chromebooks had 58% market-share in US-Education. The success of Chromebooks in education was reported on by The New York Times in May 2017. Which explains the success "This became Google’s education marketing playbook: Woo school officials with easy-to-use, money-saving services. Then enlist schools to market to other schools, holding up early adopters as forward thinkers among their peers."

In June 2017, CMS-district was reported to be on a 150.000 Chromebooks 1:1 program. It looks like 1:1 Chromebook programs have come become very popular on the basis of adoption and evangelizing by enthusiastic users in schools. The suburbs of Chicago are most often mentioned as influencers. Leyden in District 212 has on its main page Dr. Nick Polyak saying "Over 2,000 educators from across the country have visited Leyden to learn about teaching and learning in the digital age." which clearly refers to its 1:1 program. The history of Leyden's 1:1 program is clearly told in the 2014 article "How many administrators does it take to get a district to go one to one". So there is evidence that successful schools indeed show others the way.

The original legitimization for 1:1 education may have been derived from research by the Red group (mainly financed by Intel) whose findings describe the potential of transforming education "Our findings demonstrate that schools employing a 1:1 student-computer ratio and key implementation factors outperform other schools, and reveal significant opportunities for improving education return on investment (ROI) by transforming teaching and learning". The influence of the change in teaching is also stressed academically like in "Chromebooks and the G Suite group of products, like Google Search, Gmail, and Google Docs, have rapidly expanded in American schools during the past 5 years. The impact of one-to-one Chromebook devices and the pervasive use of Google's software products in American education cannot be overstated." Apple is also promoting its own 1:1 iPad programs and there are some signs of uptake of its "classroom" software and iPads for example in San Bernardino. Other countries where 1:1 programs are successful are Sweden, New Zealand (both mentioned in the New York Times article mentioned above).
