= Hull, Iowa =

- City
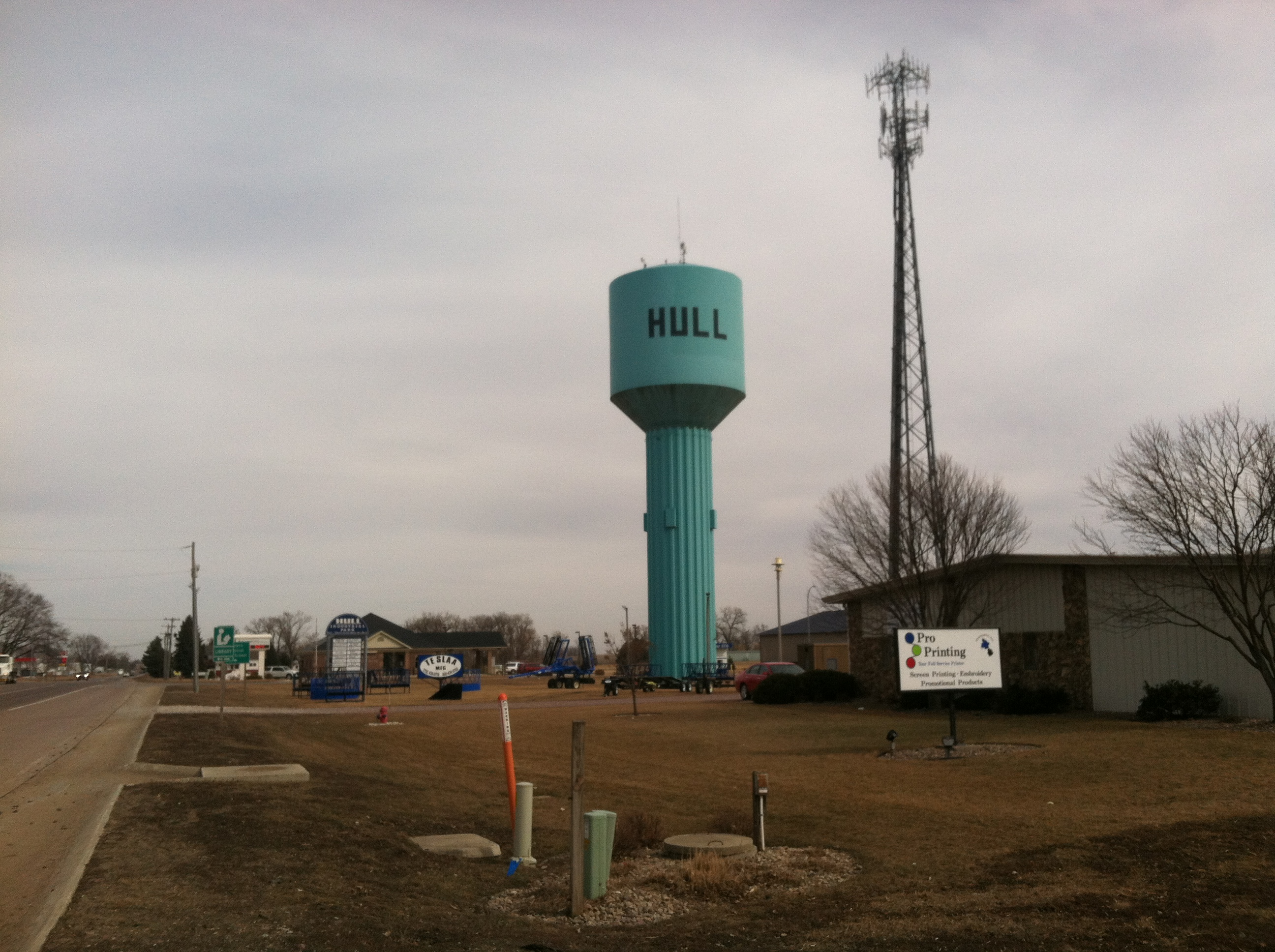
- Water tower located in the Hull (Iowa) Industrial Park just off US Highway 18.
- Motto: Where Great Ideas Are Born
- Location of Hull, Iowa
- Coordinates: 43°11′22″N 96°07′44″W
- Country: United States
- State: Iowa
- County: Sioux
- Incorporated: May 15, 1886

Government
  - Type: Mayor-council
  - Mayor: Arlan Moss

Area
  - Total: 1.41 sq mi (3.64 km^{2})
  - Land: 1.41 sq mi (3.64 km^{2})
  - Water: 0 sq mi (0.00 km^{2})
- Elevation: 1,440 ft (440 m)

Population (2020)
  - Total: 2,384
  - Density: 1,696.1/sq mi (654.87/km^{2})
- Time zone: UTC-6 (Central (CST))
  - Summer (DST): UTC-5 (CDT)
- ZIP code: 51239
- Area code: 712
- FIPS code: 19-37515
- GNIS feature ID: 2394442
- Website: City of Hull

Hull is a city in Sioux County, Iowa. The population was 2,384 at the time of the 2020 census.

== History ==
The first settlers in the Hull area arrived in 1872. The city was incorporated on May 15, 1886. Hull was named for John A. T. Hull, a member of the United States House of Representatives from Iowa. It was previously named Pattersonville for John G. Patterson, before changing its name to Winland then finally Hull in the 1880s.

In 1993, The Foreign Candy Company of Hull became the first American firm to import Warheads sour candy.

In 2004, Hull received a $400,000 grant from Vision Iowa to build the Pattersonville Park and Cultural Center. Some of the money was returned in 2011 because the park had not been constructed.

== Geography ==
According to the United States Census Bureau, the city has a total area of 1.20 square miles (3.11 km^{2}), all land.

== Demographics ==
Historical populations
Year	Pop.	±%
1890	566	—
1900	626	+10.6%
1910	658	+5.1%
1920	791	+20.2%
1930	905	+14.4%
1940	1,072	+18.5%
1950	1,127	+5.1%
1960	1,289	+14.4%
1970	1,523	+18.2%
1980	1,714	+12.5%
1990	1,724	+0.6%
2000	1,960	+13.7%
2010	2,175	+11.0%
2020	2,384	+9.6%
Source:"U.S. Census website". United States Census Bureau. and Iowa Data Center; Source: U.S. Decennial Census

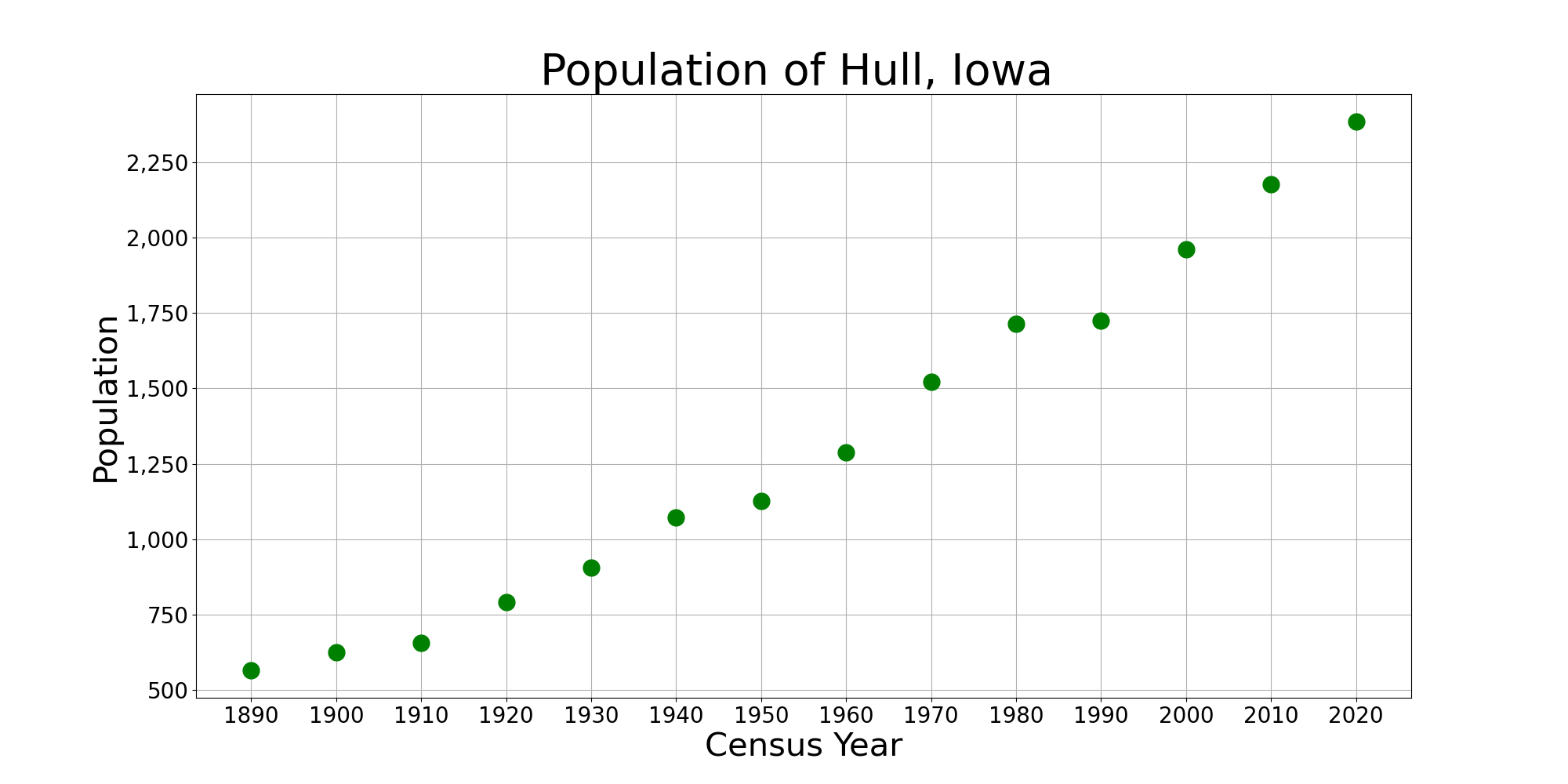
The population of Hull, Iowa from US census data

=== 2020 census ===
As of the 2020 census, Hull had a population of 2,384, with 824 households and 617 families residing in the city.

The median age was 33.9 years. 30.7% of residents were under the age of 18 and 18.5% were 65 years of age or older. In age cohorts, 33.8% of residents were under age 20, 5.2% were from 20 to 24, 23.8% were from 25 to 44, and 18.8% were from 45 to 64. The gender makeup was 49.7% male and 50.3% female. For every 100 females there were 98.8 males, and for every 100 females age 18 and over there were 97.0 males age 18 and over.

0.0% of residents lived in urban areas, while 100.0% lived in rural areas.

Of the 824 households, 39.7% had children under the age of 18 living with them. Of all households, 66.1% were married-couple households, 3.6% were cohabitating couples, 11.9% were households with a male householder and no spouse or partner present, and 18.3% were households with a female householder and no spouse or partner present. About 25.1% of households were non-families, 22.0% were made up of individuals, and 11.9% had someone living alone who was 65 years of age or older.

There were 865 housing units at an average density of 620.5 per square mile (239.6/km^{2}), and the population density was 1,710.0 inhabitants per square mile (660.2/km^{2}). Of housing units, 4.7% were vacant. The homeowner vacancy rate was 1.6% and the rental vacancy rate was 11.4%.

Racial composition as of the 2020 census
Race	Number	Percent
White	2,078	87.2%
Black or African American	3	0.1%
American Indian and Alaska Native	11	0.5%
Asian	18	0.8%
Native Hawaiian and Other Pacific Islander	0	0.0%
Some other race	160	6.7%
Two or more races	114	4.8%
Hispanic or Latino (of any race)	312	13.1%

=== 2010 census ===
As of the census of 2010, 2,175 people, 741 households, and 577 families resided in the city. The population density was 1,812.5 inhabitants per square mile (699.8/km^{2}). The 764 housing units averaged 636.7 per square mile (245.8/km^{2}). The racial makeup of the city was 92.6% White, 0.4% African American, 0.6% Native American, 0.7% Asian, 5.1% from other races, and 0.7% from two or more races. Hispanics or Latinos of any race were 9.1% of the population.

Of the 741 households, 38.9% had children under the age of 18 living with them, 71.7% were married couples living together, 3.5% had a female householder with no husband present, 2.7% had a male householder with no wife present, and 22.1% were not families. About 20.1% of all households were made up of individuals, and 8.4% had someone living alone who was 65 years of age or older. The average household size was 2.85 and the average family size was 3.30.

The median age in the city was 32.5 years; 30.5% of residents were under the age of 18; 8.5% were between the ages of 18 and 24; 25% were from 25 to 44; 20.3% were from 45 to 64; and 15.6% were 65 years of age or older. The gender makeup of the city was 49.8% male and 50.2% female.

=== 2000 census ===
As of the census of 2000, there were 1,960 people, 682 households, and 527 families residing in the city. The population density was 1,638.4 inhabitants per square mile (632.6/km^{2}). There were 709 housing units at an average density of 592.7 per square mile (228.8/km^{2}). The racial makeup of the city was 94.34% White, 0.05% African American, 1.12% Asian, 3.78% from other races, and 0.71% from two or more races. Hispanic or Latino of any race were 6.28% of the population.

There were 682 households, out of which 40.0% had children under the age of 18 living with them, 72.7% were married couples living together, 2.9% had a female householder with no husband present, and 22.7% were non-families. 21.3% of all households were made up of individuals, and 13.9% had someone living alone who was 65 years of age or older. The average household size was 2.80 and the average family size was 3.30.

In the city, the population was spread out, with 30.7% under the age of 18, 8.5% from 18 to 24, 24.5% from 25 to 44, 17.9% from 45 to 64, and 18.4% who were 65 years of age or older. The median age was 34 years. For every 100 females, there were 95.4 males. For every 100 females age 18 and over, there were 90.5 males.

The median income for a household in the city was $38,269, and the median income for a family was $43,919. Males had a median income of $31,100 versus $17,991 for females. The per capita income for the city was $16,153. About 6.1% of families and 8.2% of the population were below the poverty line, including 10.5% of those under age 18 and 10.5% of those age 65 or over.

== Education ==
Boyden–Hull Community School District includes Hull in its boundary, and operates Boyden-Hull Elementary School in Boyden, and Boyden–Hull Junior/High School in Hull; the latter houses the district's headquarters.

Area private schools:

- Hull Christian School
- Hull Protestant Reformed Christian School
- Trinity Christian High School
- Western Christian High School

== Economy ==
=== Business ===
Located in Northwest Iowa, much of Hull's economy is centered around the agricultural industry, either directly or indirectly. Agropur Cooperative is located in Hull and is the largest employer. The Foreign Candy Company, distributors of Warheads sour candy and other sweets, was started in Hull in 1978. The Pizza Ranch restaurant chain was founded in Hull in 1981. The Hull Co-op Society provides a number of agricultural services to Hull and surrounding areas, including a grain elevator, feed mill, and custom spraying. Other businesses include Hull Feed and Produce which provides feed mill services, and Hull Veterinary Clinic.

The Baumann Brothers General Store was located in Hull until the 1910s.

=== Finance ===
Two banks have branches in Hull: Iowa State Bank and American State Bank. Iowa State Bank started as Baumann Brothers Bank in 1879. Ten years later, it was renamed Iowa State Bank. It closed for a short period during the Great Depression and was reopened in 1934. American State Bank moved to Hull in 2004, and constructed a new building in 2007.

== Notable people ==
- Dwayne Alons, Iowa state representative
- Randy Feenstra, U.S. representative from Iowa
- Nancy Metcalf, indoor volleyball player
- Wilmon Newell, entomologist
- William Earl Rowe, lieutenant governor of Ontario
- Alexander Grant Ruthven, president of the University of Michigan
