= Iowa's 4th House of Representatives district =

American legislative district

House District 4
- Type: District of the Lower house
- Location: Iowa
- Representative: Skyler Wheeler
- Parent organization: Iowa General Assembly

The 4th district of the Iowa House of Representatives is a legislative district in Iowa, composed of Lyon County and part of Sioux County.

== Representatives ==
The district has been represented by:

- Forest Davis, 1933–1935
- Robert K. Beck, 1953–1955
- Walter W. P. Kruse, 1971–1973
- Rollin Edelen, 1973–1975
- Donald W. Spencer, 1975–1979
- Lee Warren Holt, 1979–1983
- Wayne D. Bennett, 1983–1993
- Ralph Klemme, 1993–2003
- Dwayne Alons, 2003–2014
- John Kooiker, 2015–2017
- Skyler Wheeler, 2017–
