= Dennis Marion Schnurr =

American Catholic archbishop (2009–2025)

His Excellency, The Most Reverend Dennis Marion Schnurr
- Archbishop Emeritus of Cincinnati
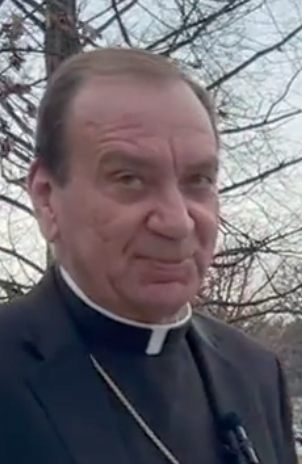
- Archbishop Schnurr
- Archdiocese: Cincinnati
- Appointed: October 17, 2008 (Coadjutor)
- Installed: December 21, 2009
- Retired: February 12, 2025
- Predecessor: Daniel Edward Pilarczyk
- Successor: Robert Gerald Casey
- Previous posts: Coadjutor Archbishop of Cincinnati (2008-2009); Bishop of Duluth (2001-2008)

Orders
- Ordination: July 20, 1974 by Frank Henry Greteman
- Consecration: April 2, 2001 by Harry Joseph Flynn, Gabriel Montalvo Higuera, and Lawrence Donald Soens

Personal details
- Born: June 21, 1948 (age 78) Sheldon, Iowa, U.S.
- Denomination: Roman Catholic
- Education: Loras College; Pontifical Gregorian University; Catholic University of America
- Motto: "Quaerite faciem Domini" (Seek the face of the Lord)

Styles of Dennis Marion Schnurr
- Reference style: His Excellency; The Most Reverend
- Spoken style: Your Excellency
- Religious style: Archbishop

Ordination history of Dennis Marion Schnurr
History
Episcopal consecration
- Consecrated by: Harry Joseph Flynn (St Paul & Minn.)
Episcopal succession
Bishops consecrated by Dennis Marion Schnurr as principal consecrator
- Joseph R. Binzer: June 9, 2011
- Jeffrey Marc Monforton: September 10, 2012
- David J. Bonnar: January 12, 2021
- Earl K. Fernandes: May 31, 2022

Dennis Marion Schnurr (born June 21, 1948) is an American Catholic prelate who served as Archbishop of Cincinnati in Ohio from 2009 to 2025. He served as Bishop of Duluth in Minnesota from 2001 to 2009.

== Biography ==
=== Early life and education ===
Dennis Schnurr was born on June 21, 1948, in Sheldon, Iowa, to Edward and Eleanor (née Jungers) Schnurr. One of six children, he has two brothers and three sisters. Raised in Hospers, Iowa, he attended Spalding Catholic High School in Granville, Iowa, before entering Loras College in Dubuque, Iowa. Schnurr graduated from Loras with a Bachelor of Arts degree in 1970. He then went to Rome, where he earned a Master of Theology degree in 1974 from the Pontifical Gregorian University.

=== Ordination and ministry ===
Schnurr was ordained to the priesthood at St. Anthony Church in Hospers, Iowa, by Bishop Frank Greteman on July 20, 1974, for the Diocese of Sioux City. After his 1974 ordination, the diocese assigned Schnurr as an associate pastor at the Cathedral of the Epiphany Parish and Blessed Sacrament Parish, both in Sioux City, Iowa, for the next three years.

In 1977, Schnurr went to Washington, D.C. to study at the Catholic University of America School of Canon Law, receiving a Doctorate of Canon Law in 1980. After his graduation, he returned to Sioux City, where Bishop Frank Henry Greteman appointed him vice-chancellor of the diocese. Greteman also named Schnurr as the diocesan finance officer and as a judge on the diocesan tribunal. In 1981, Schnurr became chancellor and secretary of the presbyteral council.

In 1985, Schnurr left Sioux City to serve on the staff of the Apostolic Nunciature in Washington, D.C. He was appointed as associate general secretary of the United States Conference of Catholic Bishops (USCCB) in 1989. During his tenure in this position, he supervised departments dealing with education, domestic and international social policy, and communications. Schnurr organized the 1993 World Youth Day, held in Denver, Colorado. He was raised by the Vatican to the rank of prelate of honor in 1993 and elected general secretary of the USCCB in 1994.

=== Bishop of Duluth ===
On January 18, 2001, Schnurr was appointed as the eighth bishop of Duluth by Pope John Paul II. He received his episcopal consecration at the Duluth Entertainment Convention Center on April 2, 2001, from Archbishop Harry Flynn, with Archbishop Gabriel Higuera and Bishop Lawrence Soens serving as co-consecrators. Schnurr selected as his episcopal motto: Quaerite faciem Domini, meaning, "Seek the face of the Lord" from Psalms 105:4.

Schnurr ordained Fr. Mike Schmitz to the priesthood on June 6, 2003.

=== Coadjutor and archbishop of Cincinnati ===
Schnurr was named coadjutor archbishop of Cincinnati by Pope Benedict XVI on October 17, 2008. As coadjutor, Schnurr automatically succeeded Archbishop Daniel Pilarczyk when he retired on December 21, 2009.

In 2010, Schnurr revoked permission for a "Violence Against Women" event at Seton High School, a Catholic school in Cincinnati, because one of the speakers supported abortion rights for women. The sponsors disinvited the speaker, but the archdiocese still denied its support for the event.

In November 2018, Schnurr expressed "enormous disappointment" at a Vatican request for the USCCB to delay a vote on tightening procedures for sexual abuses case. The Vatican said it wanted to consider a global response first.

In August 2019, Schnurr removed Auxiliary Bishop Joseph Binzer from his position as the head of priest personnel for the archdiocese. Reverend Geoff Drew, a priest in St. Jude Parish, had raped a 10-year-old boy between 1988 and 1991. After learning about these allegations, Binzer failed to report them to the archbishop or other officials in the archdiocese. Binzer resigned as auxiliary bishop in May 2020.

In May 2020, Schnurr decided not to renew the contract of Jim Zimmerman, a teacher at Archbishop Alter High School in Kettering, Ohio, because he was part of a same-sex marriage. A teacher at the school for 23 years, Zimmerman was open about his marriage with school officials, other faculty and students. According to Zimmerman, his principal told him that a community member had alerted Schnurr about the marriage. Zimmerman's supporters at Alter High School and in Kettering accused Schnurr of homophobia, which he strongly denied.

In July 2021, Schnurr said that he disapproved of a town hall being held by US President Joe Biden at Mount Saint Joseph University in Cincinnati, but admitted he had no power to block it. Schnurr did not explain his reasoning. Schnurr said that he would have never approved this event on archdiocese property. In October 2021, Schnurr presented a restructuring plan for the archdiocese that could close 70% of its parishes.

In October 2024, Schnurr announced the severing of a 110-year partnership with the Girl Scouts of the USA and the Girl Scouts of Western Ohio. Schnurr stated that recent changes by the national organization did not align with Catholic teaching on sexuality and gender identity.

=== Retirement and legacy ===
On February 12, 2025, Pope Francis accepted Schnurr's resignation as archbishop of Cincinnati and named Chicago Auxiliary Bishop Robert G. Casey to succeed him.

Schnurr was diagnosed in May 2024 with stage 3 small bowel cancer and immediately began chemotherapy. He later underwent back surgery following a fall. On February 19, 2025, Schnurr was scheduled to appear at the Andrew Dinner at St. Mary's Church in Hyde Park, Cincinnati, but was forced to cancel due to the recovery from his back surgery.

== Viewpoints ==
=== Abortion ===
Schnurr in August 2023 urged Ohio Catholics to reject the Right to Reproductive Freedom with Protections for Health and Safety ballot measure, which would have enshrined abortion rights for women in the Ohio State Constitution. He claimed that the measure would allow doctors to “take the lives of innocent children in the womb while harming women and families in the process.” Voters approved the amendment by a large margin in November 2023.

=== Immigration ===
In January 2017, Schnurr expressed his opposition to the refugee ban on people from certain Muslim-majority nations that was enacted by the Trump administration. Schnurr said that refugees had a right to seek a safe place for themselves and their families.

=== Same sex marriage ===
In June 2015, Schnurr expressed his disapproval of the U.S. Supreme Court decision legalizing same-sex marriage. In an official statement, he explained that the court's decision "disregarded not only the clearly expressed will of the electorate in Ohio and other states," but that is had undermined a notion of matrimony "shared by virtually all cultures" until the very recent past.

=== Sexuality ===
In February 2015, Schnurr condemned the 2015 film Fifty Shades of Grey, calling it an attack on marriage, and asked Catholics to boycott it.

Schnurr in April 2018 persuaded the administration of Mercy Health – Clermont Hospital in Batavia, Ohio, to stop the distribution of condoms at their facility. The Hamilton County Public Health Harm Reduction Program, which was hosting a needle exchange program in the hospital parking lot, had also been providing condoms to participants to promote safe sex.

== See also ==
- Catholic Church hierarchy
- Catholic Church in the United States
- Historical list of the Catholic bishops of the United States
- List of Catholic bishops of the United States
- Lists of patriarchs, archbishops, and bishops

Catholic Church titles
Preceded by Daniel Edward Pilarczyk	Archbishop of Cincinnati; 2009–2025	Succeeded by Robert Gerald Casey
Preceded by Roger Lawrence Schwietz	Bishop of Duluth; 2001–2008	Succeeded by Paul Sirba
