= Saints Peter and Paul Catholic Church (Pocahontas, Iowa) =

Historic church in Iowa, United States

- U.S. National Register of Historic Places
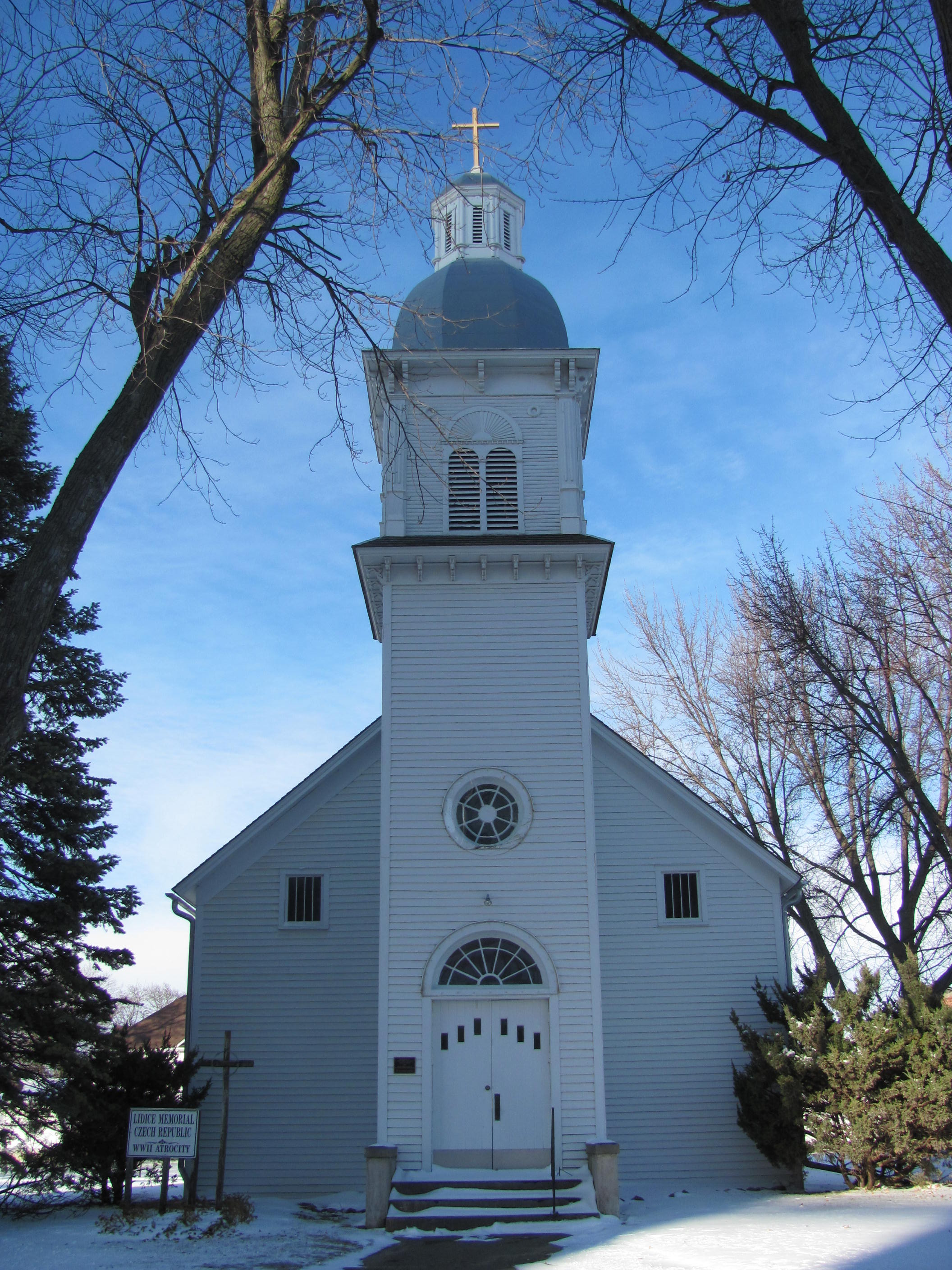

- Location within Iowa Location within the United States
- Location: 16 2nd Ave., NW, Pocahontas, Iowa
- Coordinates: 42°44′05″N 94°40′13.2″W
- Area: less than one acre
- Built: 1882
- Built by: Will Hubel
- Architectural style: Italianate; Greek Revival
- NRHP reference No.: 94000086
- Added to NRHP: March 1, 1994

Saints Peter and Paul Catholic Church is a former parish church of the Diocese of Sioux City. The historic building is located in Pocahontas, Iowa, United States. The parish served the Bohemian community that lived in the Pocahontas area. It was listed on the National Register of Historic Places in 1994.

== History ==
The first Catholic Mass in Pocahontas was celebrated in 1875, by the Rev. T.M. Lenahan from Fort Dodge. The liturgies were celebrated irregularly in a schoolhouse until 1881. That year Pocahontas was organized as a mission of St. Patrick's on Lizard Creek in Webster County. The Rev. Mathew Norton, started celebrating mass once a month. At that time, the parishes in this area were in the Diocese of Dubuque.

In 1882, Warrick Price donated three acres of land, east of town for a church and cemetery. Will Hubbel designed the building and directed the construction done by the men of the local Bohemian community. Hubbel built almost all of the early buildings in Pocahontas. The altar was built by Charles Andera of Spillville. Mary Payer donated the altar as well as a picture of St. Peter and St. Paul that was painted in Bohemia. The bells for the church, named Agnes and Joseph, were brought from St. Louis, Missouri. The first resident pastor, the Rev. J.P. Bronz, served the parish from 1891 to 1895. The rectory was built at this time. In 1894, the church building was moved from the Calvary Cemetery property on the east side of town to its current location west of the central business district. The church was enlarged and remodeled the following year. A school was begun by the parish in 1896, and the Sisters of St. Francis of the Holy Family from Dubuque served as the teachers.

In 1901, Sacred Heart Parish was established in Pocahontas for the Germans and Irish, and school went with them. Saints Peter and Paul became a Bohemian national parish to serve that immigrant community, and it became a parish of the Sioux City diocese when it was established the following year. It was difficult, however, for the bishop to maintain a Bohemian-speaking priest in the parish. The Rev. Michael J. Kolvek was the pastor from 1923 to 1938, and the Rev. John Turza was the pastor from 1954 to 1957. The parish's other pastors could not speak the language.

Renovations were made to the church in 1957, which included new floors, pews, altar, and communion rail. It was redecorated in 1964, and changes were made a couple years later which reflected the liturgical changes inspired by the Second Vatican Council. The altar was changed so the priest could face the congregation.

By 1975, Pocahontas no longer needed two parishes, let alone a national parish for Bohemians. Bishop Frank Greteman merged both Saints Peter and Paul and Sacred Heart in Pocahontas into one parish named Resurrection of Our Lord. Both churches were initially used for liturgy. Saints Peter and Paul Church was permanently closed in 1983. It was listed on the National Register of Historic Places in 1994. The last Mass in the church was held in 1997.

== Architecture ==
The wood-frame building measures 90 by 32 feet (27.4 by 9.8 m) and it features a three-story tower. It exhibits a combination of Italianate and Greek Revival elements. The Italianate influence is found in the round-arched windows and the paired brackets on the belfry. The Greek Revival is found in the fanlight over the main entrance; the pilastered corner boards and the fanlight motif on the upper section of the tower; and the lantern that caps the tower.

Saints Peter and Paul is significant for several reasons. It was the first Catholic church in Pocahontas County, and it holds an association with the Bohemian people who settled here. The church building is significant for its Italianate and Greek Revival design and its association with its builder, Will Hubbel. It is the last of the wood-frame church buildings left in Pocahontas, and one of the last in the county.
