= St. Boniface Catholic Church (Sioux City, Iowa) =

- St. Boniface Historic District
- U.S. National Register of Historic Places
- U.S. Historic district
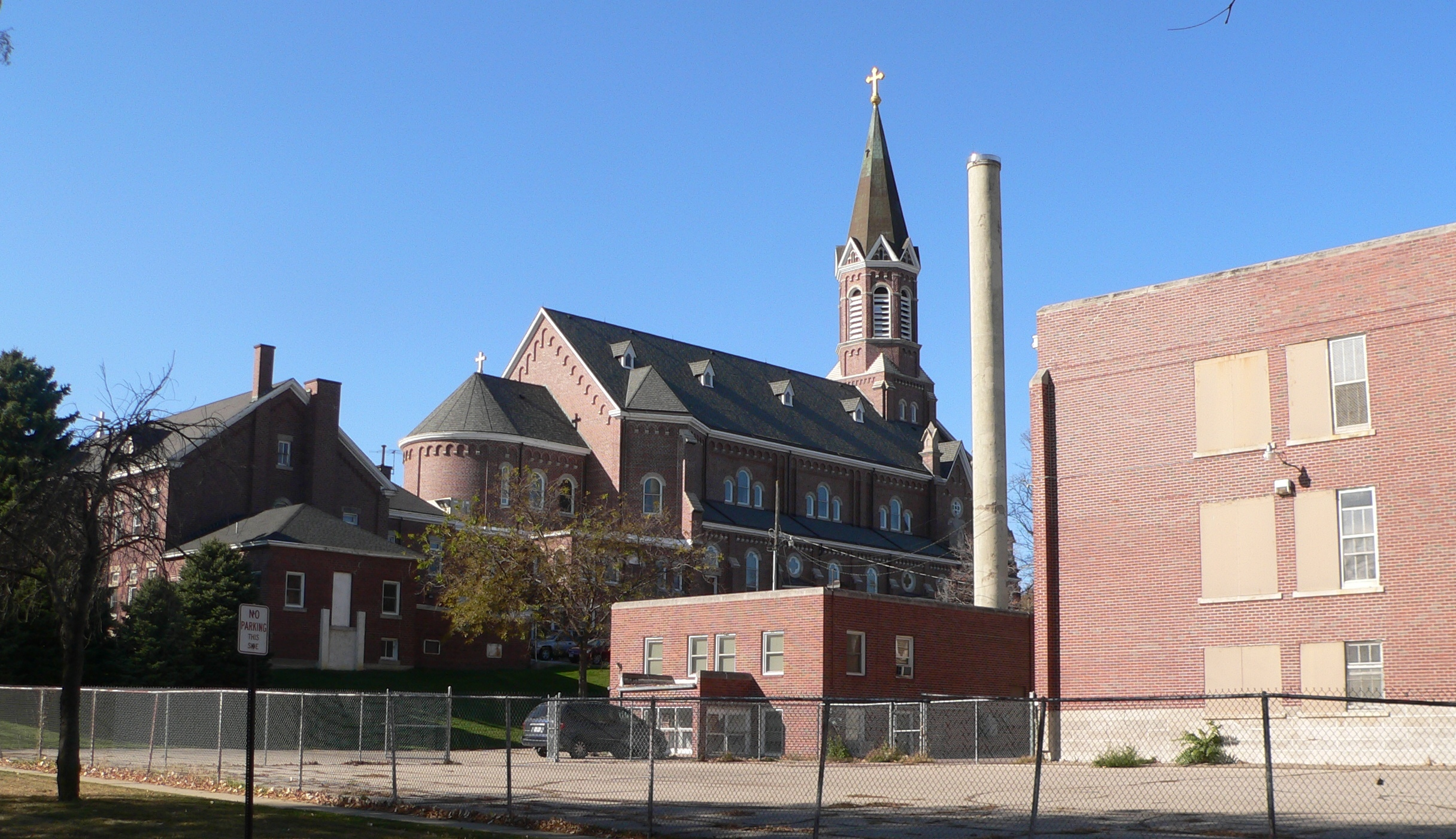

- Location within Iowa Location within the United States
- Location: 703 W. 5th St., 515 Cook St., and 700 W. 6th St., Sioux City, Iowa
- Coordinates: 42°30′4″N 96°25′3″W
- Area: 2.3 acres (0.93 ha)
- Built: 1910, 1911, 1924
- Architect: Bro. Leonard Darscheid; William LaBarthe Steele
- Architectural style: Late 19th and 20th Century Revivals
- NRHP reference No.: 98001322
- Added to NRHP: November 5, 1998

St. Boniface Catholic Church is a parish of the Diocese of Sioux City. The church is located in a residential area west of downtown Sioux City, Iowa, United States. The parish buildings form a nationally recognized historic district that was listed on the National Register of Historic Places in 1998 as St. Boniface Historic District. At the time of its nomination it contained three resources, all of them contributing buildings.

== History ==
In December 1885 a meeting was held by German Catholics in Sioux City to form a new parish. It was the second parish in the city. They purchased two lots on the corner of West Fifth and Main Streets for $1,500. The Rev. John A Gerleman was appointed the parish's first pastor on Christmas Eve 1886. A small frame church was built and the first Mass in the church was celebrated on July 17, 1887. The parish school opened the same year with Franciscan Sisters from Dubuque, Iowa teaching in the school.

The parish was started when Sioux City was still in the Diocese of Dubuque. It became a parish in the Sioux City diocese when it was formed in 1902. In 1906 Franciscan Friars from the Sacred Heart Province started serving the parish. That year the Rev. Seraphin Lampe, OFM, became the pastor that year and plans were made for a new church. A new church and rectory were built on West Fifth Street between Omaha and Cook Streets. Brother Leonard Darschield, OFM, designed the new church in the Romanesque Revival style. The new church was dedicated by Bishop Philip Garrigan on September 4, 1911. That same a year a new convent for the sisters was built. It was also designed by Brother Leonard and looked similar to the church and rectory. It was torn down in 1993 to add parking spaces after a fire gutted its interior.

The present school building and heating plant were designed by prominent Sioux City architect William LaBarthe Steele, and completed in 1924. The Sisters of the Living Word started staffing the school in 1975. In 1986 the Franciscan Friars left the parish and were replaced by priests from the diocese. The schools from St. Boniface, St. Joseph, and the Cathedral of the Epiphany consolidated in 1987 to form Holy Family School. Subsequently, the three parishes have been clustered as well. Weekend Masses are celebrated in St Boniface Church in English and Spanish.

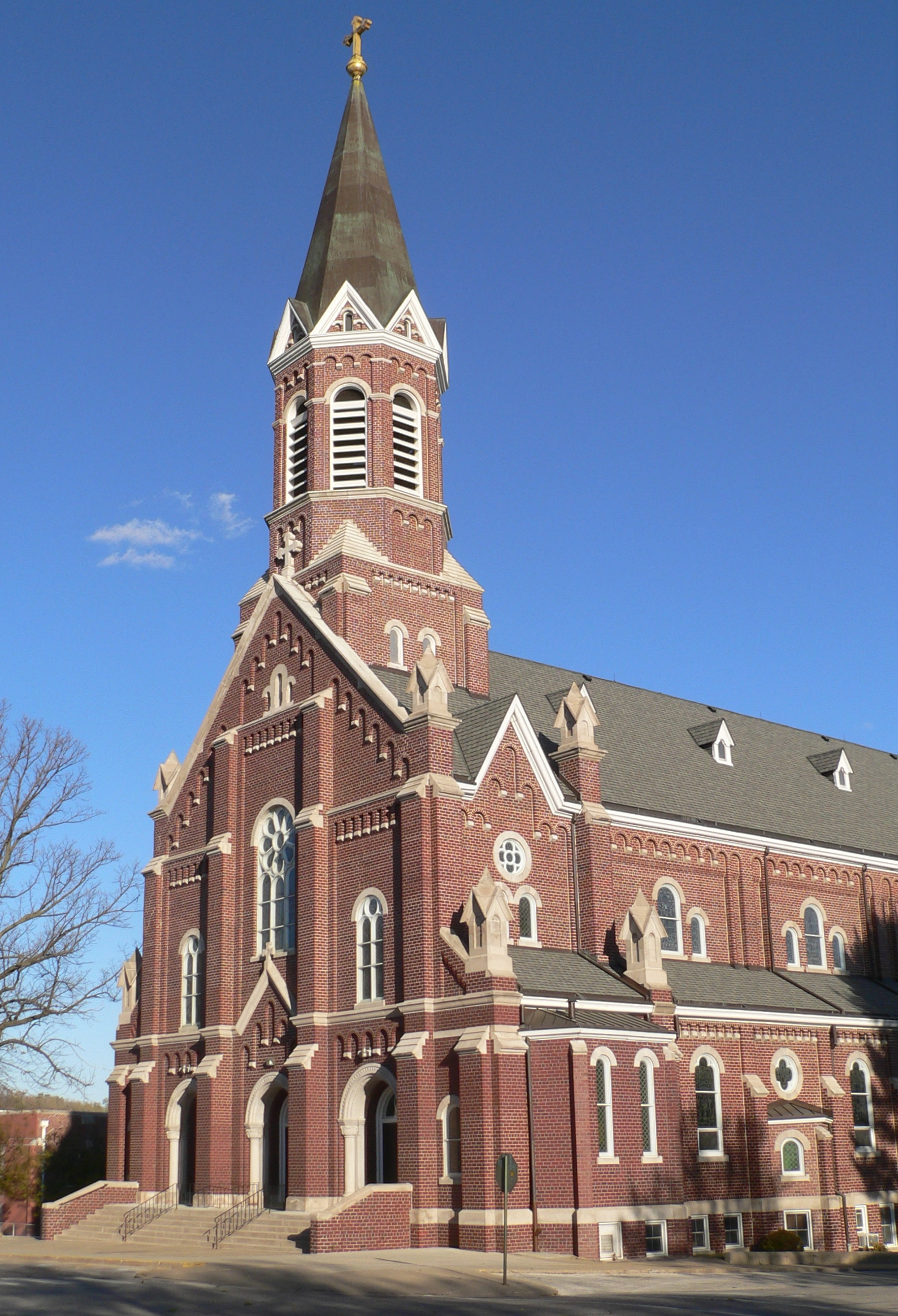
Church

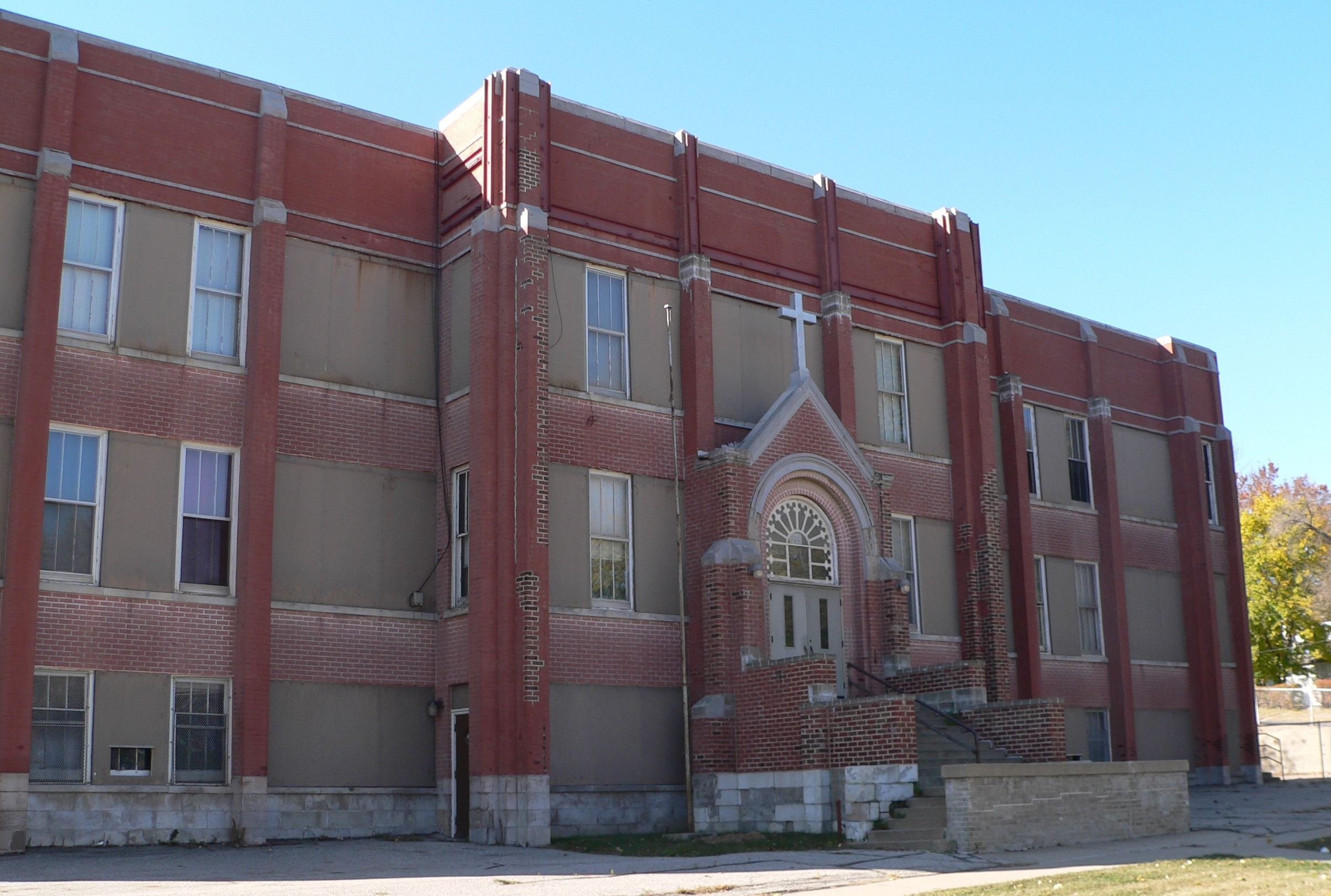
School

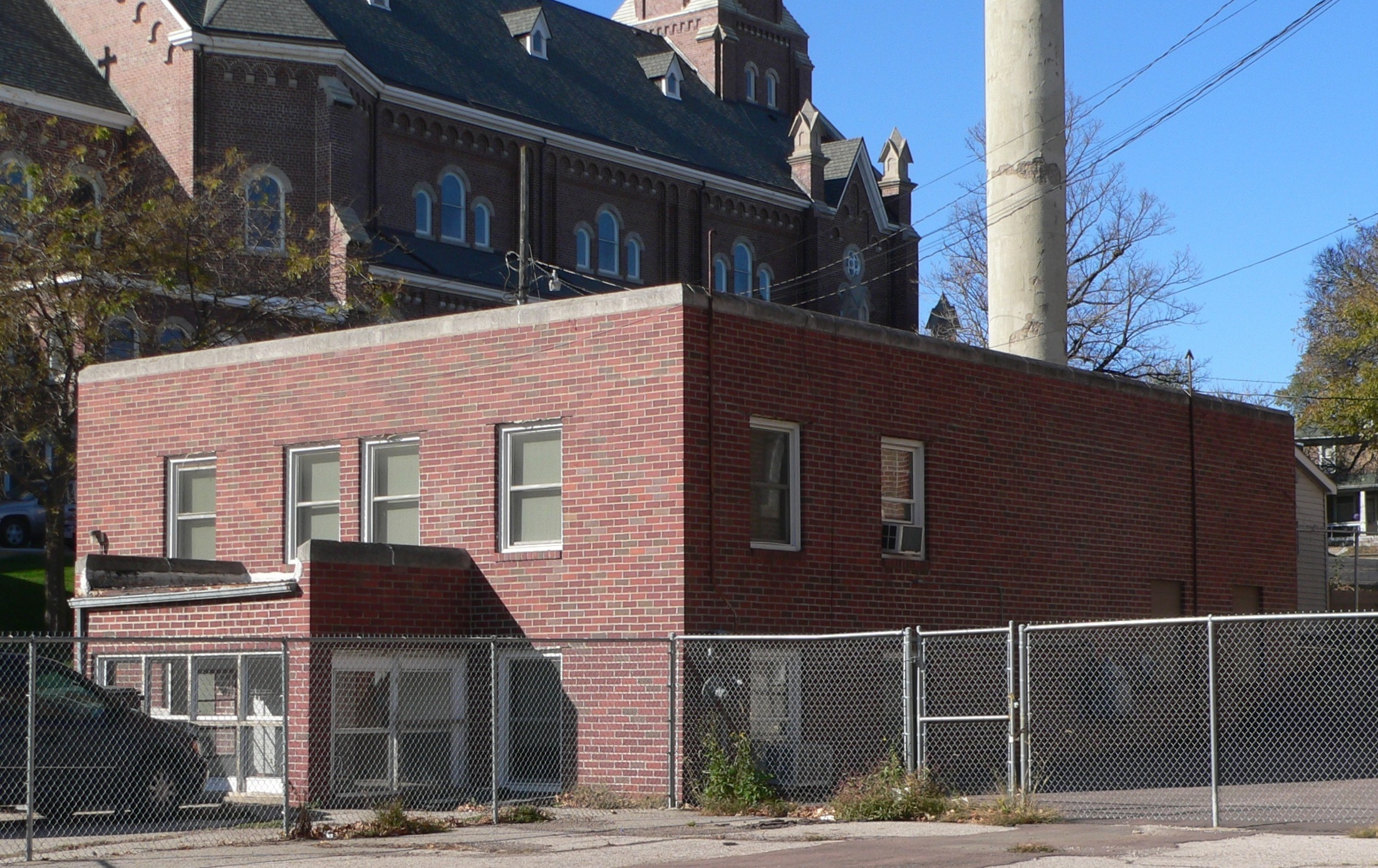
Heating plant

== Architecture ==
The church building measures 160 by 80 feet (49 by 24 m) with a 162.5-foot (49.5 m) tower over the front Gable. At the time it was built, St. Boniface Church was the tallest structure in Sioux City. The exterior is clad with brick from Buffalo, New York and the trim is in Bedford limestone. The building features a symmetrical facade of three bays, four roof dormers each on the north and south elevations, and a rounded apse on the east elevation. The 66 stained glass windows in the church include round-arch widows and a rose window. They were produced in Munich, Germany in 1910. The interior features a rib vaulted ceiling that rises 54 feet (16 m) above the floor. The original wood altars were carved by a Franciscan brother. Statues of Saint Boniface and Saint Patrick are located on the high altar, while statues of the Blessed Virgin Mary and Saint Joseph are on the side altars. A social hall is located in the basement. The attached rectory is a 2 1/2-story front-gable residence that features the same detailing and materials as the church.

The two-story brick school building was designed to reflect the style of the church. It features a projecting center bay on its north elevation that includes the main entrance. It has a flat roof. The building has been altered over the years. The simple, two-story brick power plant was built at the same time as the school. It is located directly behind the school building and it includes a 98-foot (30 m) tall concrete smokestack.
