= Corpus Christi Catholic Church (Fort Dodge, Iowa) =

- Corpus Christi Church
- U.S. National Register of Historic Places
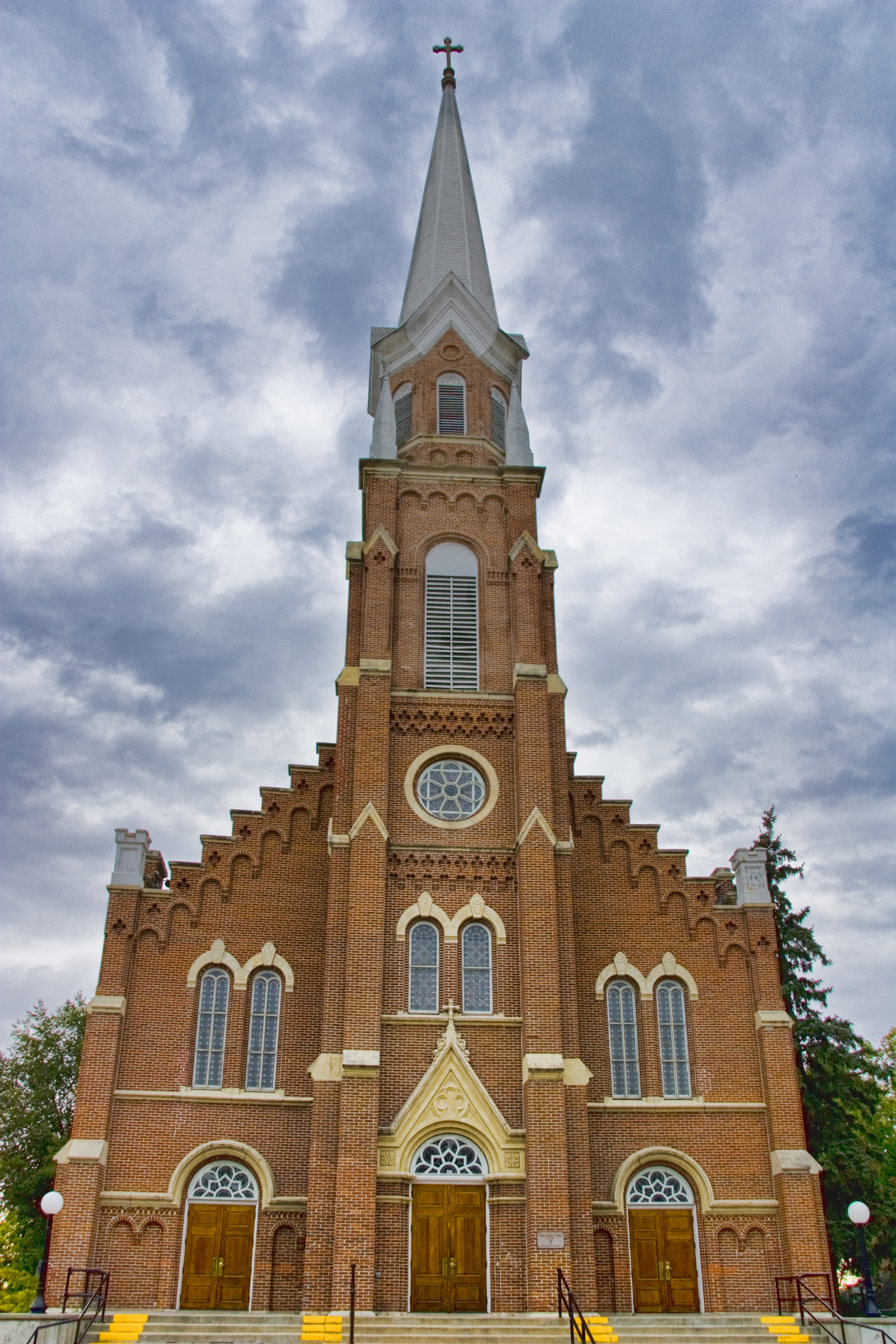

- Location within Iowa Location within the United States
- Location: 416 N. 8th St. Fort Dodge, Iowa
- Coordinates: 42°30′31″N 94°11′20″W
- Area: less than one acre
- Built: 1882
- Architect: Fred Herr; A.V. Lambert
- Architectural style: Romanesque Revival
- NRHP reference No.: 76000812
- Added to NRHP: October 8, 1976

Corpus Christi Catholic Church is a parish of the Diocese of Sioux City. The church is located in Fort Dodge, Iowa, United States and is listed on the National Register of Historic Places.

== History ==
Corpus Christi parish can trace its beginnings to a Mass that was held in the home of Michael Collins in 1855. At the time the Fort Dodge area was a part of the Diocese of Dubuque, which covered the state of Iowa. The parish was founded the following year and the Rev. John Vahey was sent as its first pastor. It was the first parish founded in what would become the Diocese of Sioux City. Priests from here would visit mission stations as far away as Emmetsburg, Spirit Lake and Sioux City well into the 1860s. The first piece of property purchased for the parish was in 1857 at a cost of $200. The first church and rectory were built on the property the same year.

The stone for the current church was quarried starting 1879 with construction starting the following year. It was designed by Dubuque architect Fridolin Heer, Sr., and local architect A.V. Lambert supervised construction. The church was completed in 1882, and dedicated on January 1, 1883. The Romanesque Revival structure cost $37,892.59 to construct. The convent, rectory and central heating plant were built between the years 1909 and 1932.

In July 2000, Corpus Christi became part of a "team ministry" that brought together the five parishes in Webster County. In addition to Corpus Christi the parishes include: Sacred Heart and Holy Rosary in Fort Dodge, St. Matthew's in Clare, and St. Joseph's in Barnum.

== Architecture ==
The main body of the church is a rectangular block that is six bays long and three bays wide. It measures 128 by 58 feet (39 by 18 m), and its central bell tower rises to a height of 175 feet (53 m). The locally quarried limestone is rusticated on the foundation, and smooth on the window caps and hoods. The locally produced brick forms the exterior of the structure. The gabled ends are stepped, and there is a corbel table at the eaves. The interior features three naves separated by columns, a rear gallery, and a skylight over the apse.

== Parochial School ==
The parish school opened in 1859 during the pastorate of Father Marsh, although classes were being held prior to this time in the church. The first school building was a two-story structure with a cupola. The Sisters of Charity of the Blessed Virgin Mary taught in the school from 1862 to 1865. Lay teacher taught in the school from 1865 to 1873. The Sisters of Mercy were next to teach in Fort Dodge from 1873 to 1902. In 1900 Mother Mary Catherine discovered a fire that completely destroyed the school. "The Academy" of Corpus Christi Parish was opened in 1902. The new school was built for $20,000. The year it opened the Sisters of Charity BVM returned to the school and taught in Fort Dodge for the next 100 years. High school classes ended at Corpus Christi in 1956 when St. Edmond High School opened. The Academy building was torn down in 1975.
