= Cathedral of the Epiphany (Sioux City, Iowa) =

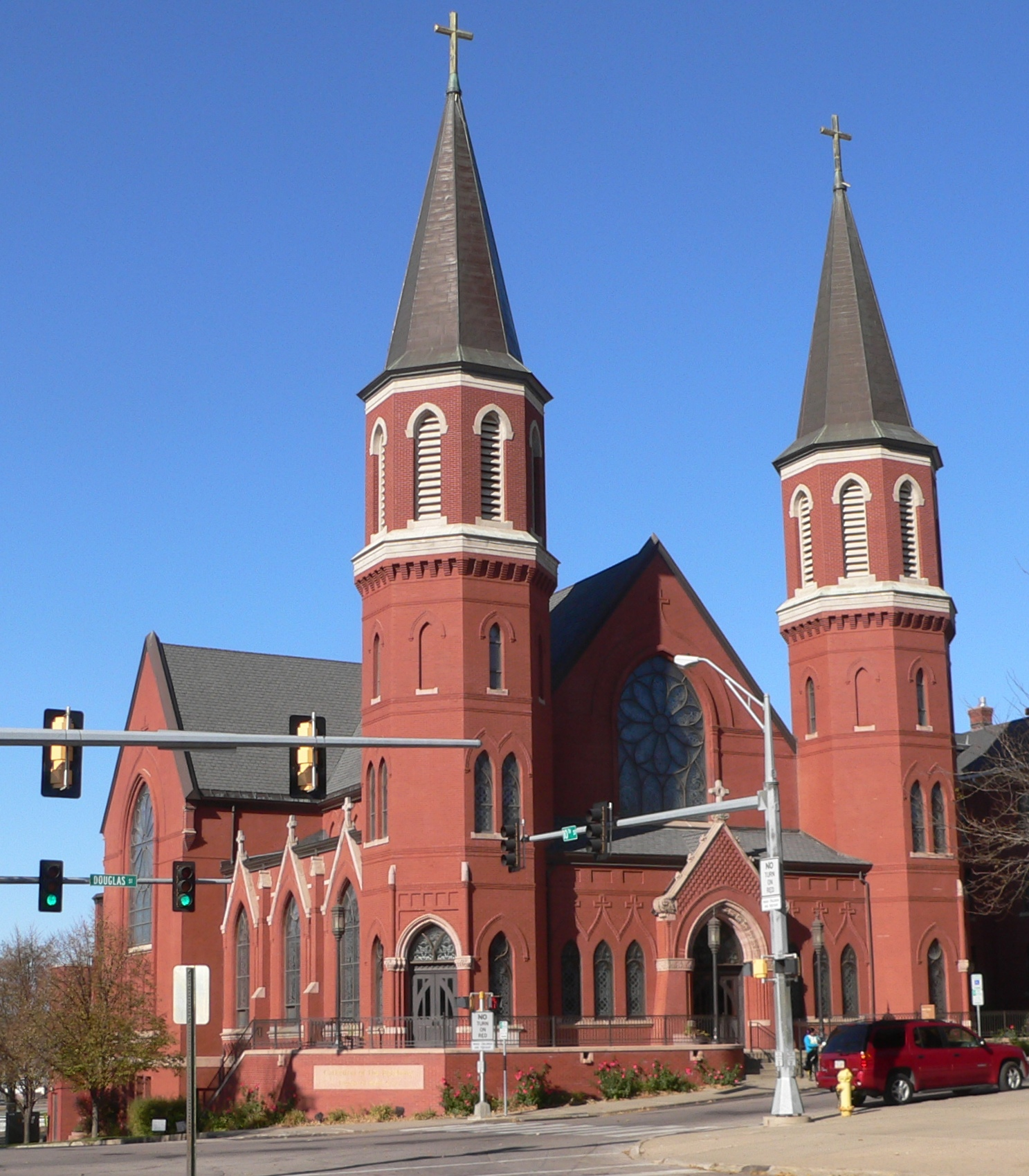
- Cathedral of the Epiphany
- 42°30′03″N 96°24′25″W
- Location: 1000 Douglas St. Sioux City, Iowa
- Country: United States
- Denomination: Roman Catholic Church
- Website: www.sccathedral.org

History
- Status: Cathedral/Parish
- Founded: 1891
- Dedication: Epiphany

Architecture
- Architect: Charles P. Brown
- Style: Gothic Revival
- Completed: 1904

Specifications
- Materials: Brick

Administration
- Diocese: Sioux City

Clergy
- Bishop: Most Rev. John Edward Keehner
- Rector: Very Rev. David Esquiliano, JCL

The Cathedral of the Epiphany is a cathedral and a parish church located in Sioux City, Iowa, United States. It is the seat of the Diocese of Sioux City.

== History ==
Rev. Jeremiah Tracey celebrated the first Mass in Sioux City in the log cabin of Mr. and Mrs. Louis Desy in 1855. The Cathedral of the Epiphany had its beginnings as St. Mary's Church in 1891. Rev. Timothy Treacy was the first pastor of the parish that was intended to serve the needs of a growing number of Irish and German immigrant Catholics in the central part of the city. However, construction of a new church was delayed because of the economic depression that hit the United States in 1893.

For the next 10 years, parishioners worshipped in the basement of the present church. When Pope Leo XIII established the Diocese of Sioux City in 1902, Bishop Philip Garrigan decided that St. Mary's Church would serve as the cathedral and began work to complete the upper church. He also sought permission from the Holy See to change the name of the parish. Bishop Garrigan dedicated the edifice, without its signature spires, on September 8, 1904, as the Cathedral of the Epiphany.

A minor renovation of the cathedral was carried out in 1939 when Monsignor Thomas Conghlan was the pastor. In 1952, the two spires were added to the towers. In 1961 a building project was initiated by Bishop Joseph Mueller. It completely changed the interior of the cathedral. A new marble altar with baldachin replaced the old wooden altar. It also included other new furnishings, paint schemes, and lighting.

In the 1980s as the number of parishioners started to significantly decline, consideration was given to closing the parish. An influx of Catholic immigrants from Latin America and Southeast Asia reversed that trend. Today the parish continues to foster diversity as Masses are offered in English, Spanish, Vietnamese, and Latin.

The most recent renovation project was in 1994 and addressed roofing, gutters, tuckpointing, and other exterior issues as well as restoring many of the interior elements and decoration that were removed in 1961. A $1 million gift from William and Eleanore Metz started the fundraising campaign for the $3 million interior remodeling project. Des Moines architect Larry Ericsson of the restoration firm Wetherell-Ericsson was responsible for the designs that were meant to reflect the building's early 20th-century appearance. The cathedral was rededicated on November 10, 1998.

== Architecture ==
The cathedral is considered a fine example of 19th-century German Gothic design. The baptismal font was designed by local architect William L. Steele. The cathedral's sixty-one stained glass windows are from Franz Mayer & Co. in Munich, Germany, and were restored in the late 1980s. The reredos in the apse, the side altars, and Stations of the Cross are from the former St. Thomas Church in Emmetsburg, Iowa. It closed while work was underway during the 1990s renovation and the items were donated to the cathedral as they are similar in style to those same items removed from the cathedral in 1961. Religious statues were hand-carved and hand-painted in Italy.

== Pipe organ ==
The Orgelbau Wech (2006) pipe organ is in a gallery-level case in the rear of the cathedral. It features a traditional style console with a mechanical action console that is detached from the main case. It is equipped with two manuals, 3 divisions, 31 stops, 29 registers, 37 ranks. The manual compass is 58 notes and the pedal compass is 30 notes. The organ has slider chests, balanced mechanical key action, and electric stop action. The drawknobs are arranged in horizontal rows on terraced/stepped jambs. There are balanced swell shoes/pedals. The combination action is a computerized/digital system. Rounding out the features are a slightly concave, straight pedalboard, combination action thumb pistons, combination action toe studs, coupler reversible thumb pistons, and coupler reversible toe studs.

Stoplist:

HAUPTWERK Manual 1, 58 notes

- 16 Bourdon
- 8 Principal
- 8 Rohrflote
- 8 Salicional
- 8 Voce Humana
- 4 Octave
- 4 Spitzflote
- 2-2/3 Quinte
- 2 Superoctave
- 2 Gemshorn
- 1-3/5 Terz
- IV Misture
- 8 Trompete

OBERWERK Manual 2, 58 notes, expressive

- 8 Principal
- 8 Bourdon
- 8 Gambe
- 8 Voix Celeste
- 4 Octave
- 4 Flute
- 2-2/3 Sesquialtera
- 2 Superoctave
- 1-1/3 Quinte
- 1 Scharff
- 16 Dulzian
- 8 Oboe

Pedal

- 16 Subbass
- 8 Principal
- 8 Bourdon
- 4 Octave
- 16 Posaune
- 8 Trompette

Accessories

- Tremulant
- Zimbelstern
- Vogelsong

== Parochial School ==
In the 1940s, parishioners started talking about replacing their old school. The last graduation from Cathedral High School was held on June 1, 1949. That fall Bishop Heelan Catholic High School opened and the Sisters of Charity of the Blessed Virgin Mary continued to teach at Heelan.

By 1957, it became obvious that both Epiphany and Heelan needed new school facilities. The diocese held a fund drive and purchased three lots at the corner of Tenth and Douglas Streets for $40,500. The new grade school was built on the site and opened in September 1959. The parish grade school closed when schools from Epiphany, St. Boniface, and St. Joseph consolidated in 1987 to form Holy Family School. The former school building, now called Epiphany Center, houses offices, parish center, and religious education classrooms for the parish. The Epiphany Center also houses the Cathedral Dual Language Academy for elementary students under the administration of Bishop Heelan Catholic Schools.

== See also ==
- List of Catholic cathedrals in the United States
- List of cathedrals in the United States
