= Daniel DiNardo =

American Catholic cardinal (born 1949)

His Eminence Daniel DiNardo
- Cardinal, Archbishop Emeritus of Galveston-Houston
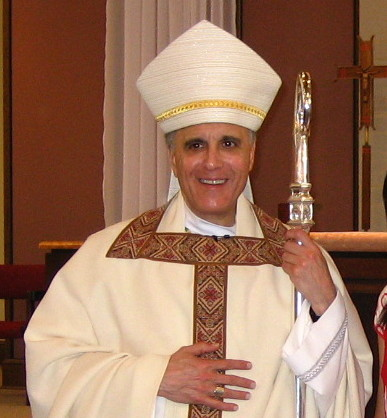
- DiNardo in 2006
- Church: Latin Church
- Archdiocese: Galveston-Houston
- Appointed: December 29, 2004
- Installed: February 28, 2006
- Retired: January 20, 2025
- Predecessor: Joseph Fiorenza
- Successor: Joe S. Vásquez
- Other posts: Apostolic Administrator of Amarillo (2026–); Cardinal-Priest of S. Eusebio (2007–)
- Previous posts: President, United States Conference of Catholic Bishops (2016–2019); Member, Council for the Economy (2014–2020); Bishop of Sioux City (1998–2004); Coadjutor Bishop of Sioux City (1997–1998)

Orders
- Ordination: July 16, 1977 by Vincent Martin Leonard
- Consecration: October 7, 1997 by Lawrence Donald Soens, Donald Wuerl, and Raymond Leo Burke
- Created cardinal: November 24, 2007 by Pope Benedict XVI
- Rank: Cardinal Priest

Personal details
- Born: Daniel Nicholas DiNardo; May 23, 1949 (age 77) Steubenville, Ohio
- Denomination: Catholic
- Motto: Ave crux spes unica (Latin for 'Hail, o cross, our only hope')
- Styles
- Reference style: His Eminence; The Most Reverend Eminence
- Spoken style: Your Eminence
- Religious style: Cardinal
- Informal style: Cardinal

Ordination history
History
Episcopal consecration
- Consecrated by: Lawrence Donald Soens (Bishop of Sioux City)
- Date: October 7, 1997
Episcopal succession
Bishops consecrated by Daniel DiNardo as principal consecrator
- William Mulvey: March 25, 2010
- George Sheltz: May 2, 2012
- Joseph Strickland: November 28, 2012
- Brendan J. Cahill: June 29, 2015
- David Toups: August 21, 2020
- Italo Dell'Oro: July 2, 2021

Daniel Nicholas DiNardo (born May 23, 1949) is an American Catholic prelate who served as Archbishop of Galveston-Houston from 2006 to 2025. He previously served as Coadjutor and later Bishop of Sioux City from 1997 to 2004.

On November 12, 2013, DiNardo was elected vice president of the United States Conference of Catholic Bishops and on November 15, 2016, was elected its president.

DiNardo was elevated to the College of Cardinals by Pope Benedict XVI in 2007. He is the first cardinal from a diocese in the Southern United States and the state of Texas.

== Early life and education ==
Daniel Nicholas DiNardo was born on May 23, 1949, in Steubenville, Ohio, to Nicholas and Jane (née Green) DiNardo. One of four children, he has an older brother, Thomas; a twin sister, Margaret; and a younger sister, Mary Anne. The family later moved to Castle Shannon, Pennsylvania. As a child, DiNardo would pretend to celebrate mass in vestments sewn by his mother and at an altar his father constructed.

DiNardo attended St. Anne Elementary School in Castle Shannon from 1955 to 1963, and graduated from the Jesuit-run Bishop's Latin School in 1967. He then entered St. Paul Seminary at Duquesne University in Pittsburgh, Pennsylvania. In 1969, DiNardo was accepted as a Basselin Scholar in philosophy at the Theological College at Catholic University of America in Washington, D.C. He received a Bachelor of Arts degree in philosophy in 1971 and a Master of Philosophy degree in 1972.

DiNardo continued his studies in Rome, earning a Bachelor of Sacred Theology degree at the Pontifical Gregorian University and a Licentiate in Sacred Theology at the Augustinian Patristic Pontifical Institute."

== Priesthood ==
DiNardo was ordained to the priesthood for the Diocese of Pittsburgh by Bishop Leonard on July 16, 1977. After his ordination, the diocese assigned him as parochial vicar at St. Pius X Parish in Brookline, Pennsylvania. In 1981, Leonard named DiNardo as assistant chancellor of the diocese and part-time professor at St. Paul Seminary. While at St. Paul, he served as spiritual director to the seminarians.

In 1984, DiNardo worked in Rome as a staff member of the Congregation for Bishops in the Roman Curia. During this time, he also served as the director of Villa Stritch (1986 to 1989), the resident for American clergy working for at the Vatican, and as an adjunct professor at the Pontifical North American College.

Upon his return to Pittsburgh in 1991, DiNardo was named assistant secretary for education for the diocese and concurrently served as co-pastor at Madonna del Castello Parish in Swissvale, Pennsylvania. He became the founding pastor of Saints John & Paul Parish in Franklin Park, Pennsylvania, in 1994.

== Episcopal career ==
=== Coadjutor bishop and bishop of Sioux City ===
On August 19, 1997, DiNardo was appointed coadjutor bishop of Sioux City by Pope John Paul II to assist Bishop Lawrence Soens. He received his episcopal consecration on October 7, 1997, from Soens with Bishops Donald Wuerl and Raymond Burke serving as co-consecrators, in the Church of the Nativity of Our Lord Jesus Christ. DiNardo adopted as his episcopal motto: Ave Crux Spes Unica, taken from the Latin hymn Vexilla Regis and meaning, "Hail, O Cross, Our Only Hope."

DiNardo succeeded Soens as the sixth bishop of Sioux City upon the latter's resignation on November 28, 1998.

=== Coadjutor archbishop and archbishop of Galveston-Houston ===
DiNardo was later named coadjutor bishop of Galveston-Houston by John Paul II on January 16, 2004. The diocese was elevated to the rank of a metropolitan archdiocese by John Paul II on December 29, 2004, and he thus became coadjutor archbishop.

On February 28, 2006, Pope Benedict XVI accepted the retirement of Archbishop Joseph Fiorenza, and DiNardo succeeded him as the second archbishop of Galveston-Houston. He received the pallium, a vestment worn by metropolitan bishops, from Benedict XVI on June 29 of that year. In an interview after the announcement that he would be made the first Cardinal in Texas, DiNardo commented that "There is a certain sense of the church in Texas... It is more laid-back, informal, which I think is good."

=== Cardinal ===
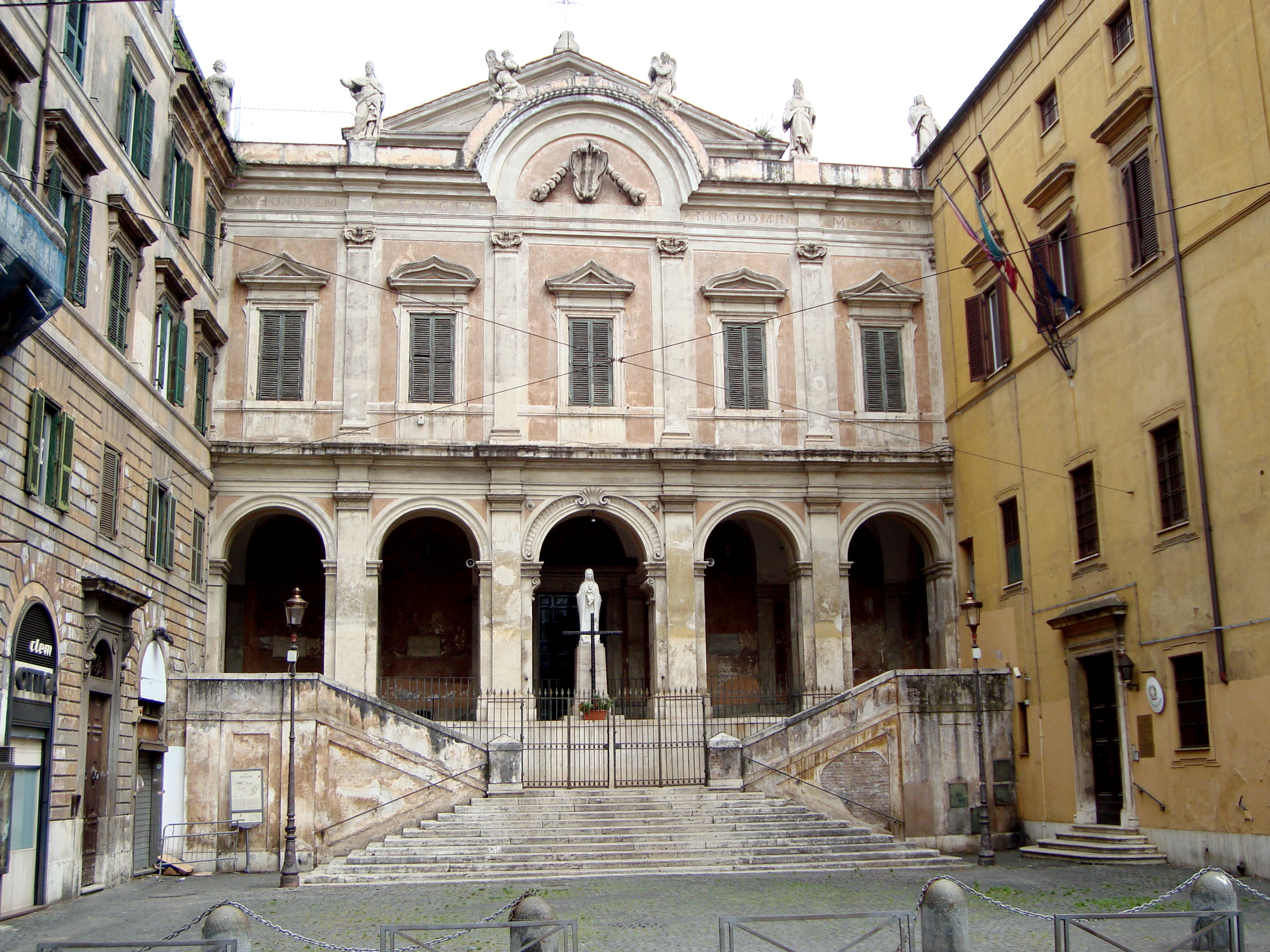
Sant'Eusebio Church, Rome, Italy (2009)

DiNardo was created cardinal-priest of Sant' Eusebio Church in Rome during the consistory of November 24, 2007. In 2008 he was awarded the Knight Grand Cross of the Order of Merit of the Italian Republic. In January 2009, DiNardo was named to the Pontifical Council for Culture.

DiNardo is a board member of the National Catholic Partnership for Persons with Disabilities. He is also a board member of Catholic University of America in Washington, D.C., an advisor to the National Association of Pastoral Musicians, a member of the Pontifical Council for the Pastoral Care of Migrants and Itinerant People, and a member of the Ad Hoc Committee to Oversee the Use of the Catechism for the USCCB. DiNardo is the Grand Prior of the USA Southwestern Lieutenancy of the Equestrian Order of the Holy Sepulchre of Jerusalem, in which he holds the rank of knight grand cross.

DiNardo was a cardinal elector who participated in the 2013 papal conclave that elected Pope Francis and in the 2025 papal conclave that elected Pope Leo XIV.

In November 2014, at the USCCB fall meeting, DiNardo was elected as a delegate to the 2015 Synod of Bishops on the Family, pending Vatican approval.

DiNardo promised to release a list of archdiocesan priests with credible accusations of sexual abuse of minors in January 2019. In November, CBS News spoke to 20 people who claim to have knowledge of incidents of misconduct, and none of them had been contacted. On January 30, 2019, DiNardo released a list of names of 40 priests from the archdiocese with credible allegations of sexual misconduct over the previous 70 years. One name on the list was John Keller. DiNardo was criticized for allowing Keller to offer Mass publicly at his parish the morning after the list was released.

After accepting his retirement on January 20, 2025 as the Archbishop of Galveston-Houston, Pope Leo named DiNardo as apostolic administrator of the Diocese of Amarillo on February 13, 2026 while awaiting a successor for the retired Bishop Patrick Zurek.

== Personal ==
DiNardo wears hearing aids because calcium deposits in his ears have impaired his hearing. Despite his hearing difficulties, he still prefers to sing or chant parts of the Mass, especially the Lord's prayer and the consecration of the body and blood of Christ. DiNardo suffered a stroke in March 2019.

== Viewpoints ==
In March 2009, DiNardo described the choice of US President Barack Obama to be the commencement speaker for the University of Notre Dame as "very disappointing", given Obama's support of abortion rights.

== See also ==
- Christianity in Houston
- Catholic Church hierarchy
- Catholic Church in the United States
- Historical list of the Catholic bishops of the United States
- List of Catholic bishops of the United States
- Lists of patriarchs, archbishops, and bishops

Catholic Church titles
Preceded by Joseph Fiorenza	Archbishop of Galveston-Houston; 2006–2025	Succeeded by Joe S. Vásquez
Preceded by Franz König	Cardinal-Priest of Sant'Eusebio; 2007–present	Incumbent
Preceded by Joseph Edward Kurtz	President of the USCCB; 2016–2019	Succeeded by José Horacio Gómez
Preceded by Lawrence Donald Soens	Bishop of Sioux City; 1998–2005	Succeeded by R. Walker Nickless
