= St. Mary's High School (Remsen, Iowa) =

Private secondary school in Remsen, Iowa, United States

St. Mary's Catholic School, Remsen

Location
- 523 Madison Street; Remsen, Plymouth County, Iowa 51050; United States; 42°48′37″N 95°58′6″W

Information
- Type: Private, Coeducational
- Motto: To act justly, to love tenderly, and to walk humbly with our God ... Micah 6:8
- Religious affiliation: Roman Catholic
- Established: 1902
- Superintendent: Mrs. Patty Lansink
- Principal: Mrs. Kim Phillips
- Chaplain: Fr. Timothy Frick
- Grades: 9–12
- Colors: Royal Blue and White
- Athletics conference: War Eagle
- Team name: Hawks
- Rival: Gehlen Catholic
- Affiliation: Diocese of Sioux City
- Athletic Director: Jarrod Schott
- Website: http://www.rsmschools.org

St. Mary's High School is a private, Roman Catholic high school in Remsen, Iowa. It is located in the Roman Catholic Diocese of Sioux City.

== Athletics ==
The Hawks compete in the following sports in the War Eagle Conference:

- Cross Country
- Volleyball
- Football
  - 2004, 2020, 2022 and 2024 8-player State Champions
- Basketball
- Wrestling
- Track and Field
- Golf
- Soccer
- Baseball - 8-time State Champions
  - Summer - 1983, 1984, 1985, 2016, & 2023 Runner Up - 2007, 2010, 2022, & 2024
  - Fall - 1980, 1981, 1984; Runner Up - 1983
- Softball

== See also ==
- List of high schools in Iowa
