= Joseph R. Binzer =

American Catholic bishop

His Excellency, The Most Reverend Joseph Robert Binzer
- Auxiliary bishop emeritus of Cincinnati; Titular Bishop of Subbar
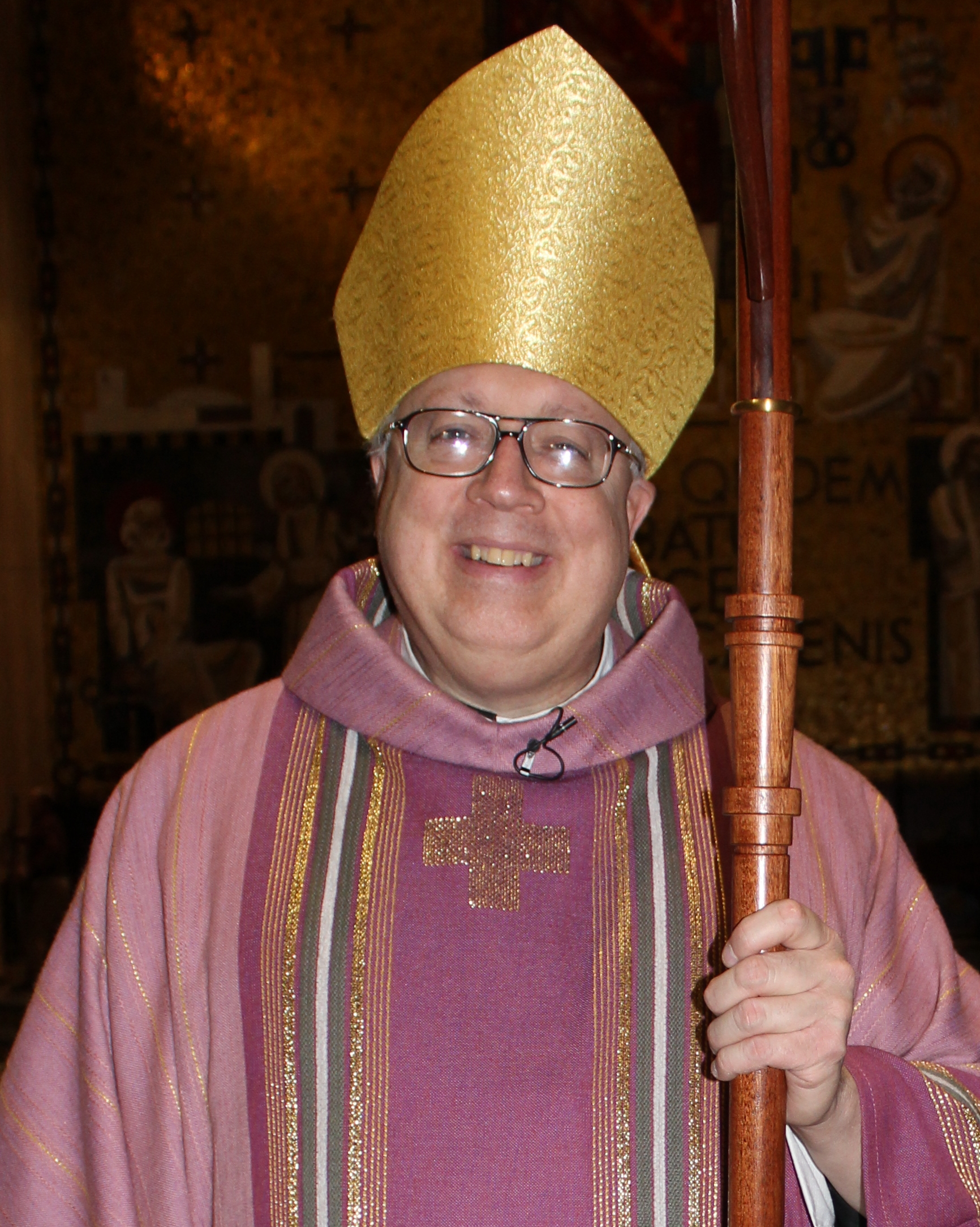
- Auxiliary Bishop Binzer in 2012
- Archdiocese: Archdiocese of Cincinnati
- Appointed: April 6, 2011
- Installed: June 9, 2011
- Retired: May 7, 2020
- Other post: Titular Bishop of Subbar

Orders
- Ordination: June 4, 1994 by Daniel Edward Pilarczyk
- Consecration: June 9, 2011 by Dennis Marion Schnurr, Daniel Edward Pilarczyk, and Robert Daniel Conlon

Personal details
- Born: Joseph Robert Binzer; April 26, 1955 (age 71) Cincinnati, Ohio, U.S.
- Education: Miami University; Mount St. Mary's Seminary of the West; Catholic University of America
- Motto: Hope in the Lord

Styles of Joseph Robert Binzer
- Reference style: His Excellency; The Most Reverend
- Spoken style: Your Excellency
- Religious style: Bishop

Joseph Robert Binzer (born April 26, 1955) is an American prelate of the Catholic Church who served as auxiliary bishop of the Archdiocese of Cincinnati, Ohio, from 2011 to 2020.

Binzer resigned as auxiliary bishop of Cincinnati in 2020 after a Vatican investigation concluded that he mishandled sexual abuse allegations against clergy.

== Biography ==
=== Early life and education ===
Joseph Binzer was born on April 26, 1955, in Cincinnati, Ohio, one of seven children of Robert and Joan (née Metz) Binzer. He received his early education at St. Ann School in Groesbeck, Ohio, and graduated from La Salle High School in Cincinnati in 1973.

Binzer earned a Bachelor of Science degree in business with a major in accountancy from Miami University in Oxford, Ohio, in 1977. He then worked for eleven years as a certified public accountant with Crowe, Chizek & Co. in South Bend, Indiana, and with Arthur Young & Co. in Cincinnati.

In 1988, Binzer began his studies for the priesthood by entering Mount St. Mary's Seminary of the West in Cincinnati. He earned a Master of Divinity degree there in 1994.

=== Ordination and ministry ===
On June 4, 1994, Binzer was ordained a priest for the Archdiocese of Cincinnati by Archbishop Daniel Pilarczyk at the Cathedral of St. Peter in Chains in Cincinnati. His first assignment was as a parochial vicar at St. Dominic Parish in Delhi Township, Ohio, where he remained for three years. He then moved to Washington D.C. to study at the Catholic University of America, where he obtained a Licentiate of Canon Law in 1999.

After returning to Cincinnati, Binzer served as a resident associate at St. Bartholomew Parish in Finneytown, Ohio and as a member of the archdiocesan tribunal. He was master of ceremonies for Pilarczyk from 2000 to 2003. In 2003, Binzer was named chancellor of the archdiocese, pastor of St. Louis Parish in Cincinnati, and director of the archdiocese's Department of Executive Services. In addition to these posts, Binzer became vicar general of the archdiocese in 2007.

=== Auxiliary Bishop of Cincinnati ===
On April 6, 2011, Binzer was appointed auxiliary bishop of Cincinnati and titular bishop of Subbar by Pope Benedict XVI. He received his episcopal consecration on June 9, 2011. Archbishop Dennis Schnurr was the principal consecrator. The principal co-consecrators were Pilarczyk and Bishop Robert Conlon. The episcopal consecration was held at Cathedral of St. Peter in Chains.

In 2013, Binzer, as head of priest personnel, received allegations of improper behavior by Reverend Geoff Drew. According to several parishioners at St. Maximilian Kolbe Parish in Liberty Township, Ohio, Drew had been giving bear hugs, shoulder massages, and leg pats to teenage boys. Binzer notified the Butler County Prosecutor's Office of these allegations, but they chose not to prosecute Drew. However, Binzer failed to notify Schnurr about Drew. In 2018, the archdiocese transferred Drew to another parish.

On July 30, 2019, Schnurr put Drew on leave, saying that he had been sending inappropriate text messages to a teenage boy. In a letter to parents, the principal of St. Ignatius School, where Drew was a teacher, said that the archdiocese had never notified him about past allegations against Drew or mentioned monitoring him. On August 5, 2019, Schnurr reprimanded Binzer for failing to notify them about the 2013 Drew allegations and removed Binzer as head of priest personnel. Some parishioners felt the archdiocese was using Binzer as a scapegoat to cover its own failures. That same month, Binzer resigned from the Child and Youth Protection Committee for the United States Conference of Catholic Bishops. In December 2021, Drew went on trial for the unrelated rape of a teenage boy 30 years earlier. Drew was laicized as a result.

=== Resignation and legacy ===
Binzer submitted his resignation as auxiliary bishop of Cincinnati to Pope Francis in late April 2020. At that time, Binzer was age 65, ten years below the mandatory retirement age of 75. On May 7, 2020, the pope accepted it. Binzer issued a public apology that said he had tendered his resignation after a Vatican investigation concluded that his handling of Drew's case had "a negative impact on the trust and faith" of the people of the archdiocese.

A year after his resignation as auxiliary bishop, Binzer was assigned as pastor at Corpus Christi Parish in Mt. Healthy, Ohio, and St. John Neumann Parish in Springfield Township, Ohio. Since July 2022, Binzer has served as pastor of Good Shepherd Parish in Montgomery, Ohio.
