= R. Walker Nickless =

American prelate

His Excellency, The Most Reverend Ralph Walker Nickless D.D.
- Bishop Emeritus of Sioux City
- Church: Roman Catholic Church
- See: Diocese of Sioux City
- Appointed: November 10, 2005
- Installed: January 20, 2006
- Retired: February 12, 2025
- Predecessor: Daniel DiNardo
- Successor: John Edward Keehner

Orders
- Ordination: August 4, 1973 by James Vincent Casey
- Consecration: January 20, 2006 by Jerome Hanus, Charles J. Chaput, and Thomas Joseph Tobin

Personal details
- Born: May 28, 1947 (age 79) Denver, Colorado, US
- Parents: R. Walker Nickless (Father); E. Margaret McGovern Nickless (Mother)
- Education: University of Denver; Pontifical Gregorian University
- Motto: Speak the truth in love

Styles of Ralph Walker Nickless
- Reference style: His Excellency; The Most Reverend
- Spoken style: Your Excellency
- Religious style: Bishop

Ralph Walker Nickless (born May 28, 1947) is an American prelate in the Roman Catholic Church. He is bishop emeritus of the Diocese of Sioux City in Iowa since 2025.

== Biography ==
Ralph Nickless was born on May 28, 1947, in Denver, Colorado, one of ten children born to R. Walker Nickless, Sr. and E. Margaret (McGovern) Nickless. He graduated from Bishop Machebeuf High School in Denver in 1965. He then attended St. Thomas Seminary in Denver and the University of Denver. Nickless eventually went to the Pontifical Gregorian University in Rome.

=== Priesthood ===
Nickless was ordained a priest by Archbishop James Casey for the Archdiocese of Denver on August 4, 1973. Nickless then served as pastor of Our Lady of Fatima Parish in Lakewood, Colorado and as vicar general of the archdiocese.

=== Bishop of Sioux City ===
Coat of arms as bishop of Sioux City

Nickless was appointed as the seventh bishop of Sioux City on November 10, 2005, by Pope Benedict XVI. He was consecrated on January 20, 2006, at the Church of the Nativity of Our Lord Jesus Christ in Sioux City. Archbishop Jerome Hanus was the principal consecrator, with Archbishop Charles Chaput and Bishop Thomas Tobin as the co-consecrators.

On February 27, 2019, Nickless released a list of 28 priests with credible accusations of sexual abuse of minors, going back to the founding of the diocese in 1902.

In October 2013, it was reported that the diocese had withheld information from parishioners regarding the arrest of Reverend John Wind five years earlier. During that incident, Wind was meeting with a female parishioner at a bakery. While there, he threatened to drop his pants and sexually assault the woman. After she called the police, they found Wind on a street corner half-naked. During his arrest, Wind punched an officer and was subdued with a taser. Wind later pleaded guilty to misdemeanor disorderly conduct, was sent away for mental health treatment, and then returned to parish work. His parish was not notified of the incident.

=== Retirement ===
In May 2022, having reached the mandatory retirement age of 75 for bishops, Nickless submitted his resignation as bishop of Sioux City to Pope Francis. This resignation was accepted on February 12, 2025.

== Viewpoints ==
=== Health Care ===
In August 2009, Nickless stated that "the Catholic Church does not teach that government should directly provide health care." Rather, he wrote,

"[t]he proper role of the government is to regulate the private sector, in order to foster healthy competition and to curtail abuses. Therefore any legislation that undermines the viability of the private sector is suspect."

=== Contraception ===
In February, 2012, Nickless spoke during a webcast sponsored by the Family Research Council of Washington, D.C. In it, he characterized an Obama Administration initiative to require health insurers to provide birth control coverage as having been sponsored by "the power of evil," and called for "followers of the light" to "stand up and vehemently oppose this."

=== White Nationalism ===
On January 16, 2019, Nickless reacted to comments made by then US Congressman Steven King, calling them "totally inappropriate". King had defended white nationalism and white supremacy in public statements.

== See also ==
- Catholic Church hierarchy
- Catholic Church in the United States
- Historical list of the Catholic bishops of the United States
- List of Catholic bishops of the United States
- Lists of patriarchs, archbishops, and bishops

Catholic Church titles
Preceded by Daniel DiNardo	Bishop of Sioux City; 2006–2025	Succeeded by John Edward Keehner
