= John Edward Keehner =

American Catholic priest (born 1965)

His Excellency, The Most Reverend John Edward Keehner
- Bishop of Sioux City
- Diocese: Sioux City
- Appointed: February 12, 2025
- Installed: May 1, 2025
- Predecessor: R. Walker Nickless

Orders
- Ordination: June 12, 1993 by James William Malone
- Consecration: May 1, 2025 by Thomas Robert Zinkula, R. Walker Nickless, and David Bonnar

Personal details
- Born: November 19, 1965 (age 60) Youngstown, Ohio
- Motto: He must increase; I must decrease

Styles of John Edward Keehner
- Reference style: His Excellency; The Most Reverend
- Spoken style: Your Excellency
- Religious style: Bishop

John Edward Keehner (born November 19, 1965) is an American prelate of the Roman Catholic Church who has been serving as bishop for the Diocese of Sioux City in Iowa since 2025.

Personal coat of arms.

== Biography ==
=== Early life ===
John Keehner was born in Youngstown, Ohio, on November 19, 1965. He graduated from Austintown Fitch High School in Austintown, Ohio, in 1984. Deciding to become a priest, he entered the Pontifical College Josephinum in Columbus, Ohio. Keehner received a Bachelor of Arts degree in English in 1988. He continued his studies at Athenaeum of Ohio- Mount St. Mary Seminary of the West in Cincinnati, Ohio, earning Master of Divinity and Master of Arts in biblical studies degrees in 1993.

=== Priesthood ===
On June 12, 1993, Keehner was ordained to the priesthood at St. Columba Cathedral in Youngstown for the Diocese of Youngstown by Bishop James W. Malone. After his ordination, Keehner was assigned as an assistant pastor of St Charles Borromeo Parish in Boardman, Ohio. In 1997, Keehner began graduate studies in canon law at the Pontifical University of Saint Thomas Aquinas in Rome. He returned to Youngstown in 1999, where he was named vice rector of St. Columba and as a judge for the diocesan tribunal.

Keehner has also served as rector of St. Columba and as director of the Newman Center at Youngstown State University in Youngstown. He served as pastor at the following parishes in Ohio:

- St. Christine, Youngstown
- St. Luke, Boardman
- St. Paul, North Canton
- Holy Spirit, Uniontown

Before his consecration, Keehner had been named dean of the Ashtabula Deanery and was serving as pastor for Our Lady of Peace Parish in Ashtabula, Assumption Parish in Geneva, Corpus Christi Parish in Conneaut and St. Andrew Bobola in Sheffield. He was also serving as national chaplain for the Ancient Order of Hibernians.

=== Bishop of Sioux City ===
Pope Francis appointed Keehner as bishop of Sioux City on February 12, 2025. On May 1, 2025, Keehner was consecrated as a bishop by Archbishop Thomas Robert Zinkula at the Cathedral of the Epiphany in Sioux City.

== See also ==
- Catholic Church hierarchy
- Catholic Church in the United States
- Historical list of the Catholic bishops of the United States
- List of Catholic bishops of the United States
- Lists of patriarchs, archbishops, and bishops

== Episcopal succession ==
Catholic Church titles
Preceded by R. Walker Nickless	Bishop of Sioux City; 2025-Present	Succeeded by Incumbent
