= Elton, County Limerick =

Townland in County Limerick, Ireland

Elton Eiltiún
- Townland
- Location within Ireland
- Coordinates: 52.426°N 8.458°W
- Country: Ireland
- Province: Munster
- County: County Limerick

Elton (Irish: Eiltiún) is a townland in County Limerick in Ireland. Located within the historical barony of Smallcounty and the civil parish of Knockainy, the townland of Elton has an area of approximately 2.98 km^{2} (1.15 sq mi). As of the 2011 census, the townland had a population of 106 people. Members of the O'Grady family were local landowners and landlords until the mid-19th century. At the main crossroads within Elton, which lies on the R515 regional road, is a retail premises which was built c. 1860 and converted to a shop c. 1925.

== Notable people ==
- Edmond Heelan (1868–1948), Bishop of Sioux City
- Frank Ryan (1902–1944), Irish republican and journalist

== See also ==
- Knocklong
