= Edmond Heelan =

Irish-born prelate

His Excellency, The Most Reverend Edmond Heelan D.D.
- Bishop of Sioux City; Titular Bishop of Gerasa
- Church: Roman Catholic Church
- See: Diocese of Sioux City
- In office: March 8, 1920 – September 20, 1948
- Predecessor: Philip Joseph Garrigan
- Successor: Joseph Maximilian Mueller
- Previous posts: Auxiliary Bishop of Sioux City; 1919 to 1920

Orders
- Ordination: June 24, 1890 by Abraham Brownrigg
- Consecration: April 8, 1919 by James Keane

Personal details
- Born: February 5, 1868 Elton, County Limerick, Ireland
- Died: September 20, 1948 (aged 80) Sioux City, Iowa, US
- Education: All Hallows College
- Motto: Adveniat regnum tuum (Thy kingdom come)

Edmond Heelan (February 5, 1868 – September 20, 1948) was an Irish-born prelate of the Roman Catholic Church. He served as bishop of the Diocese of Sioux City in Iowa from 1920 until his death in 1948. He previously served as an auxiliary bishop of the same diocese from 1919 to 1920.

== Biography ==
=== Early life ===
Edmond Heelan was born on February 5, 1868, in Elton, County Limerick, Ireland, to John and Anne (née Quish) Heelan. He studied philosophy and theology at All Hallows College in Dublin.

Heelan was ordained to the priesthood in Dublin for the Diocese of Dubuque on June 24, 1890 by Bishop Abraham Brownrigg. After his ordination, he immigrated to United States, where he was appointed as a curate St. Raphael's Cathedral Parish in Dubuque, Iowa. Heelan was appointed rector at St. Raphael's in 1893. In 1897, he was appointed pastor of Sacred Heart Parish in Fort Dodge, Iowa.

=== Auxiliary Bishop and Bishop of Sioux City ===
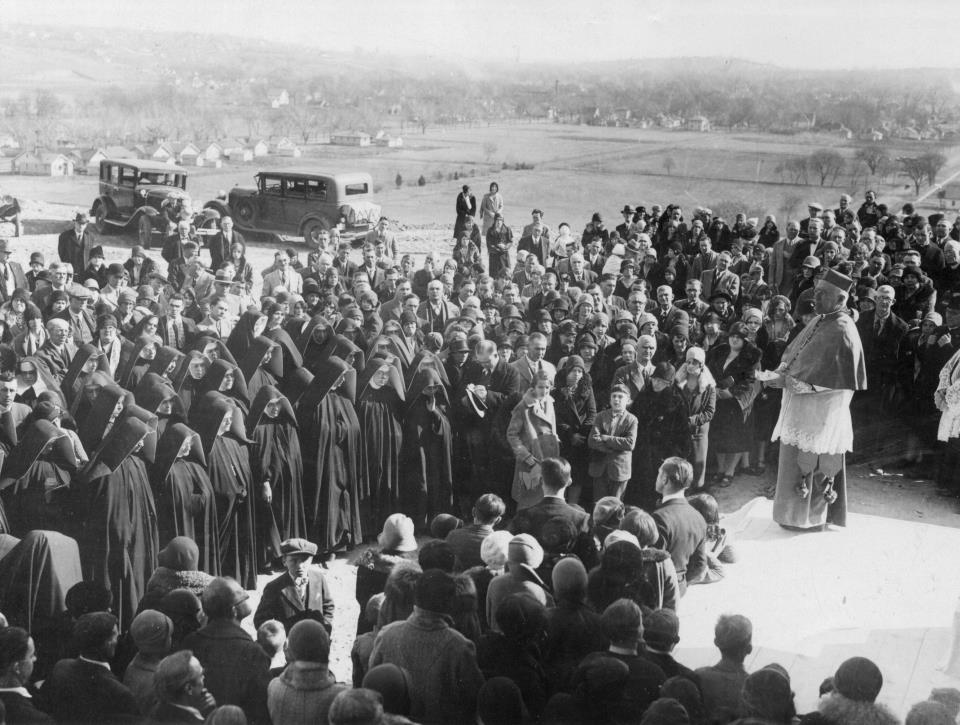
Briar Cliff College dedication ceremony, Sioux City, Iowa (1930)

On December 21, 1918, Heelan was appointed as an auxiliary bishop of Sioux City and titular bishop of Gerasa by Pope Benedict XV. He received his episcopal consecration at the Cathedral of the Epiphany in Sioux City, Iowa, on April 8, 1919, from Archbishop James Keane, with Bishops James J. Davis and Patrick McGovern serving as co-consecrators. As an auxiliary bishop, he served as rector of the Cathedral of the Epiphany.

Following the death of Bishop Philip Garrigan, Benedict XV appointed Heelan as the second bishop of Sioux City on March 8, 1920. During his term as bishop, Heelan greatly expanded Catholic education in the diocese.Heelan attended the 1928 International Eucharistic Conference in Sydney, Australia. In 1929, Heelan donated land in Sioux City to the Sisters of St. Francis for the establishment of Briar Cliff College for women. It is today Briar Cliff University. He was named assistant to the papal throne in 1941 by Pope Pius XII.

=== Death ===
Heelan died on September 20, 1948, at age 80 in Sioux City. Heelan Hall at Briar Cliff University is named after him.
