= Subbar =

Mauretania Caesariensis (125 AD).

The Diocese of Subbar (in Latin: Dioecesis Subbaritana) is a suppressed and titular see of the Roman Catholic Church.

Subbar, was founded as an ancient bishopric of the Roman province of Mauretania Caesariensis. Like most of the western part of the province, Christianity appears have arrived only in late antiquity with references to the diocese coming only after the Council of Nicaea. The town thereby avoiding many of the earlier controversies. The only known bishop from antiquity is Donato, who took part in the synod assembled in Carthage in 484 by the Arian King Huneric the Vandal, after which Donato was exiled. The bishopric appears to have effectively ceased with the Muslim conquest of the Maghreb. Today Subbar survives as a titular bishopric and the most recent bishop is Joseph Robert Binzer, Auxiliary Bishop of Cincinnati, who replaced Cherubim Dambui in 2010 and resigned in 2020.

== See also ==
- Mauretania Caesariensis
