= Bishop Garrigan High School =

Location
- 1224 North McCoy; Algona, (Kossuth County), Iowa 50511-1233; United States
- 43°4′45″N 94°12′49″W

Information
- Type: Private, Coeducational
- Religious affiliation: Christian
- Denomination: Roman Catholic
- Established: 1959
- President: Christy Peterson
- Principal: Kristie Hough
- Teaching staff: 26.5 (on an FTE basis)
- Grades: PK–12
- Student to teacher ratio: 17.9
- Colors: Black and Gold
- Song: O Garrigan
- Athletics conference: Top of Iowa
- Mascot: Bear
- Team name: Golden Bears
- Affiliation: Roman Catholic Diocese of Sioux City
- Website: http://bishopgarrigan.org

Bishop Garrigan High School is a private, Roman Catholic high school in Algona, Iowa. It is located in the Roman Catholic Diocese of Sioux City.

== Background ==
The school is named after Bishop Philip Joseph Garrigan, the 1st Bishop of the Diocese of Sioux City. The school was opened in 1959 to serve as a regional high school for 5 parishes.

== Athletics ==
The Golden Bears participate in the Top of Iowa Conference in the following sports:

- Football
  - 1985 Class 2A State Champions
  - 2023 & 2025 Class 8-Man State Champions
- Cross Country
- Volleyball
- Basketball
  - Girls’ class 1A state champions 2022, 2023
- Bowling
- Wrestling
- Golf
  - Girls' 8-time State Champions (2004, 2005, 2006, 2007, 2009, 2011, 2012, 2019)
  - Boys' 11-time State Champions (1975, 1976, 1977, 1978, 1979, 1982, 1984, 2010, 2012, 2014, 2015)
- Tennis
- Track and Field
- Baseball
- Softball

== Notable alumni ==
- Brad Nelson (2001), former MLB player for the Milwaukee Brewers
- Audi Crooks (2023), All-American basketball player at Iowa State
