= Bishop Heelan Catholic High School =

Private secondary school in Sioux City, Iowa, United States

Bishop Heelan High School

Location
- 1018 Grandview Blvd; Sioux City, Iowa 51103; United States; 42°30′10.8″N 96°24′35.2″W

Information
- Type: Private secondary school
- Motto: Faith ∙ Family ∙ Knowledge ∙ Service
- Religious affiliation: Roman Catholic
- Established: 1949
- Principal: Chris Bork
- Teaching staff: 37.6 (on an FTE basis)
- Grades: 9–12
- Enrollment: 499 (2021–22)
- Student to teacher ratio: 13.3
- Colors: Navy blue and Old Gold
- Athletics conference: Missouri River
- Nickname: Crusaders
- Newspaper: Pride Online
- Yearbook: The Shield
- Affiliation: Diocese of Sioux City
- Website: www.bishopheelan.org

Bishop Heelan is a private, Catholic high school in Sioux City, Iowa. It is located in the Roman Catholic Diocese of Sioux City. It is named after Bishop Edmond Heelan, the second bishop of the Diocese of Sioux City.

The school mascot is Crusaders, and their colors are navy and old gold.

== Athletics ==
The Crusaders compete in the Missouri River Conference in the following sports:

- Baseball
  - 2-time Class 3A State Champions (2001, 2005)
- Basketball
  - Boys' 3-time Class 3A State Champions (2009, 2010, 2011)
  - Girls' 3-time Class 3A State Champions (2008, 2010, 2021)
- Bowling
- Cross Country
- Football
  - 5-time State Champions (1961, 1971, 1982, 2008, 2013)
- Golf
- Soccer
  - Girls' 2015 and 2023 Class 1A State Champions
  - Boys’ 2024 Class 2A State Champions
- Softball
- Swimming
- Tennis
  - Girls' 1996 Class 1A State Champions
- Track and Field
  - Boys' 2-time 3A State Champions (1997, 2010)
- Volleyball
  - 4-time State Champions 1999, 2006, 2007 (3A), 2024 (4A)
- Wrestling

== Notable alumni ==
- Ron Clements, animator
- Brandon Wegher, National Football League (NFL) running back
- Mike Courey, football player, Notre Dame
- Ray Lemek, NFL Pro Bowl selection, 1961
- John Harty, 2× Super Bowl Champion (XVI, XIX) with the San Francisco 49ers.
- Trent Solsma, college football player
- Don Wengert, former Major League Baseball (MLB) player
- Joe Bisenius, former Major League Baseball (MLB) player
- Tyler Cropley, former Major League Baseball (MLB) player
- Mike Lemon, National Football League (NFL) player
- Nate Funk, former professional basketball player
- Clint Sargent, Head Basketball Coach Wright State University

== See also ==
- List of high schools in Iowa
