= Ray Lemek =

American football player (1934–2005)

No. 70, 72
- Positions: Guard, tackle

Personal information
- Born: June 28, 1934; Sioux City, Iowa, U.S.
- Died: September 17, 2005 (aged 71); Readfield, Maine, U.S.
- Listed height: 6 ft 0 in (1.83 m)
- Listed weight: 238 lb (108 kg)

Career information
- High school: Bishop Heelan (Sioux City)
- College: Notre Dame
- NFL draft: 1956: 19th round, 227th overall pick

Career history
- Washington Redskins (1957–1961); Pittsburgh Steelers (1962–1965)

Awards and highlights
- Pro Bowl (1961)

Career NFL statistics
- Games played: 117
- Games started: 114
- Fumble recoveries: 2
- Stats at Pro Football Reference

Raymond Edward Lemek (June 28, 1934 – September 17, 2005) was an American professional football player who was a guard and tackle in the National Football League (NFL) for the Washington Redskins and Pittsburgh Steelers. He played college football for the Notre Dame Fighting Irish.

Lemek played high school football for Heelan in Sioux City, Iowa, before going on to play collegiately at the University of Notre Dame, where he was the captain of the 1955 team. He was selected by the Redskins as an offensive lineman in the nineteenth round, 10th pick of the 1956 NFL draft, but did not play that year due to a leg injury. He played for the Redskins 1957–1961. For his performance in the 1960 NFL season, he was selected for the 1961 Pro Bowl. In 1962, he was traded Steelers, and played with them until he retired from football in 1966, having last played in the 1965 NFL season. He later became a salesman for 3M. He moved to Cleveland in 1976. When he retired in 1997, he had been employed as the vice president of sales for Northern Steel Transport. Afterwards, he and his wife moved to Readfield, Maine. In June 2005, it was reported that Lemek was in poor health due to suffering two strokes, and Lemek died on September 17 of that year. He was buried in the Cedar Grove Cemetery in Notre Dame, Indiana.
