= Lawrence Donald Soens =

American bishop (1926–2021)

His Excellency, The Most Reverend Lawrence Donald Soens
- Bishop of Sioux City
- Church: Roman Catholic Church
- See: Diocese of Sioux City
- Appointed: June 15, 1983
- Installed: August 17, 1983
- Term ended: November 28, 1998
- Predecessor: Frank Henry Greteman
- Successor: Daniel DiNardo

Orders
- Ordination: May 6, 1950 by Ralph Leo Hayes
- Consecration: August 17, 1983 by James Joseph Byrne, Gerald Francis O'Keefe, Frank Henry Greteman

Personal details
- Born: August 26, 1926 Iowa City, Iowa, U.S.
- Died: November 1, 2021 (aged 95) Sioux City, Iowa, U.S.
- Education: Loras College; St. Ambrose College; University of Iowa
- Motto: Tell the good news

Styles of Lawrence Donald Soens
- Reference style: Excellency; [[]]
- Spoken style: [[]]
- Religious style: Bishop

Ordination history of Lawrence Donald Soens
History
Episcopal consecration
- Consecrated by: James Joseph Byrne
- Date: August 17, 1983
Episcopal succession
Bishops consecrated by Lawrence Donald Soens as principal consecrator
- Daniel DiNardo: October 7, 1997

Lawrence Donald Soens (August 26, 1926 – November 1, 2021) was an American prelate of the Roman Catholic Church. He served as bishop of the Diocese of Sioux City in Iowa from 1983 to 1998.

In 2008, the Diocese of Davenport in Iowa announced multiple credible accusations that Soens had sexually abused children as a priest.

== Life and career ==
=== Early life ===
Lawrence Soens was born in Iowa City, Iowa, on August 26, 1926. He was educated at Loras College in Dubuque, Iowa, Saint Ambrose College in Davenport, Iowa, and studied for the priesthood at Kenrick Seminary in Shrewsbury, Missouri. He also completed graduate studies at the University of Iowa in Iowa City, Iowa.

=== Priesthood ===
Soens was ordained a priest at Sacred Heart Cathedral in Davenport by Bishop Ralph Leo Hayes on May 6, 1950, for the Diocese of Davenport. Soens' first assignment was as an assistant pastor at St. Paul's Parish in Burlington, Iowa. He then joined the faculty of St. Ambrose Academy in Davenport and then became the assistant pastor at St. Bridget's Parish in Victor, Iowa.

Soens' next assignment was as director of Regina High School in Iowa City. He went on to become the rector of St. Ambrose Seminary and served on the faculty of St. Ambrose College. His next assignment was as pastor at Assumption Parish in Charlotte, Iowa, and St. Patrick Parish in Villa Nova, Iowa. He was pastor at St. Mary's Parish in Clinton, Iowa, when Pope John Paul II named him a prelate of honor, with the title of monsignor, on December 18, 1981.

=== Bishop of Sioux City ===
On June 15, 1983, John Paul II named Soens as the fifth bishop of Sioux City. He was consecrated on August 17, 1983, at the Cathedral of the Ephiphany in Sioux City by Archbishop James Byrne. Bishops Gerald O'Keefe and Frank Greteman were the principal co-consecrators.

In February 1986, Soens received a letter detailing allegations against Reverend Jerome Coyle, a diocesan priest. The diocese had sent Coyle to Minnesota to train as a hospital chaplain. A supervisor in that program wrote Soens that Coyle was exhibiting inappropriate behavior around young boys. Soens then dispatched Coyle to the Servants of the Paraclete foundation house in Jemez Springs, New Mexico for evaluation and treatment. In May 1986, the Foundation informed Soens that Coyle had admitted to fondling up to 50 teenagers. Soens suspended Coyle from parish assignments, but did not report any of his crimes to authorities.

While Soens was bishop, many programs were established or expanded, including: Ministry 2000, the Priests Retirement Fund, youth ministry programs and the diocese mandated parish pastoral and finance commissions.

In 1997, Soens requested a coadjutor bishop to assist him with his duties. On August 19, 1997, Pope John Paul II named Monsignor Daniel DiNardo from the Diocese of Pittsburgh.

== Resignation and legacy ==
Soens's resignation as bishop of Sioux City was accepted by John Paul II on November 28, 1998.

In June 2005, Soens and the diocese were sued by a man who accused Soens of fondling him starting in 1963 when Soens was director at Regina Catholic High School in Iowa City. In November 2008, the diocesan review board for Sioux City reported that there were credible accusations that Soens had sexually abused minors. Thirty-one men had accused him of abusing them between 1950 and 1983. His case was referred to the Vatican for further action.

Lawrence Soens died in Sioux City, Iowa, on November 1, 2021, at age 95.

== See also ==
- Catholic Church hierarchy
- Catholic Church in the United States
- Historical list of the Catholic bishops of the United States
- List of Catholic bishops of the United States
- Lists of patriarchs, archbishops, and bishops

== Episcopal succession ==
Catholic Church titles
Preceded by Frank Henry Greteman	Bishop of Sioux City; 1983-1998	Succeeded by Daniel DiNardo
