= Joseph Maximilian Mueller =

American prelate

His Excellency, The Most Reverend Joseph Maxmillian Mueller D.D.
- Bishop of Sioux City; Titular Bishop of Simitthu
- Church: Roman Catholic Church
- See: Diocese of Sioux City
- In office: September 20, 1948 – October 20, 1970
- Predecessor: Edmond Heelan
- Successor: Frank Henry Greteman
- Previous posts: Coadjutor Bishop of Sioux City 1947 to 1948; Titular Bishop of Sinda

Orders
- Ordination: June 14, 1919 by James Joseph Hartley
- Consecration: October 16, 1947 by Amleto Giovanni Cicognani

Personal details
- Born: December 1, 1894 St. Louis, Missouri, US
- Died: August 9, 1981 (aged 86) Sioux City, Iowa, US
- Education: Pontifical College Josephinum
- Motto: Jesum ardenter quaerite (Seek Jesus earnestly)

Joseph Maximilian Mueller (December 1, 1894 – August 9, 1981) was an American prelate of the Roman Catholic Church. He served as bishop of the Diocese of Sioux City in Iowa from 1948 to 1970. He previously served as coadjutor bishop of the same diocese from 1947 to 1948.

== Biography ==
=== Early life ===
Joseph Mueller was born on December 1, 1894, in St. Louis, Missouri, to George Fritz and Barbara (née Ziegler) Mueller. After graduating from SS. Peter and Paul School at St. Louis in 1907, he studied at the Pontifical College Josephinum in Columbus, Ohio.

=== Priesthood ===
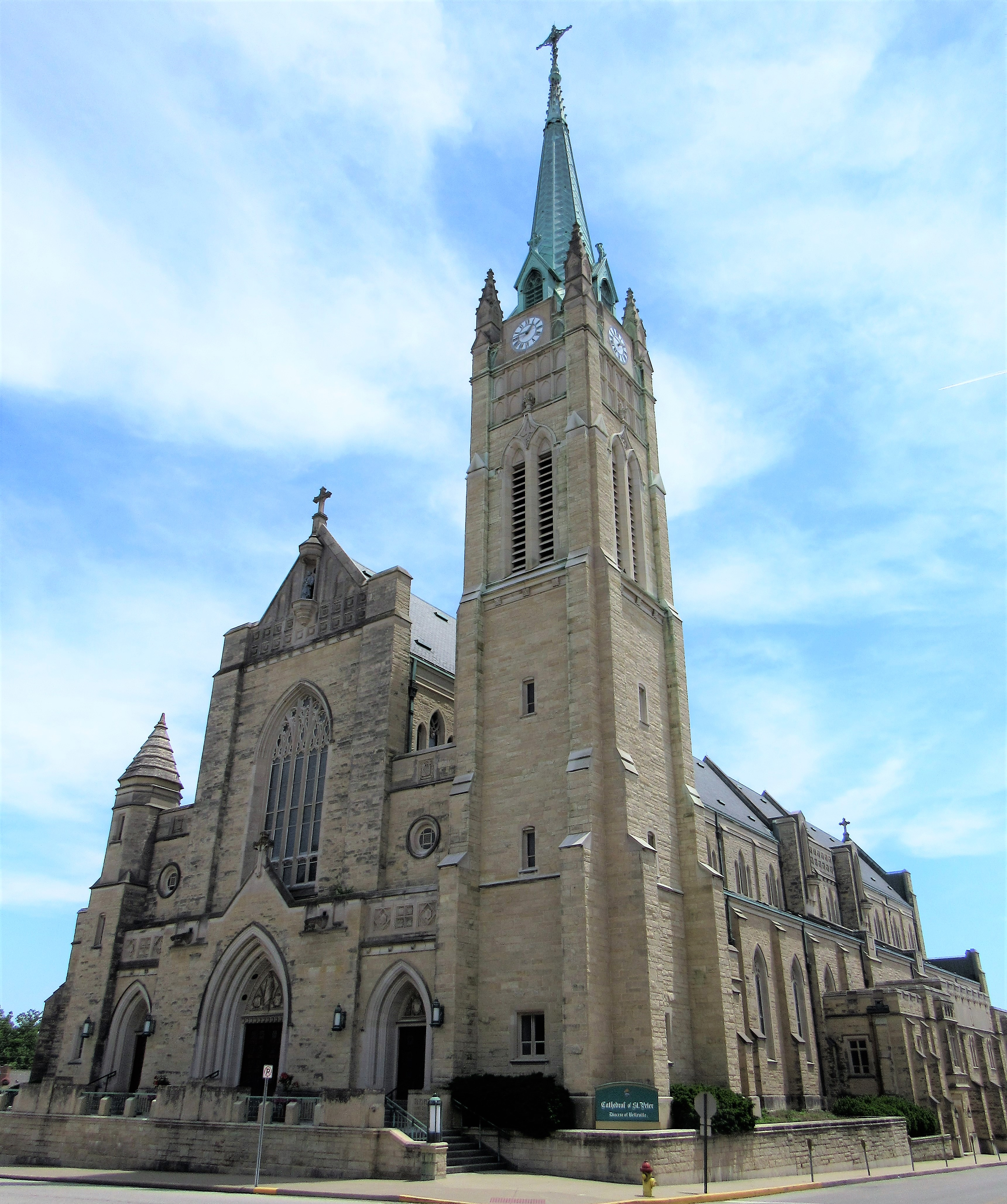
Cathedral of Saint Peter, Belleville, Illinois (2018)

Mueller was ordained to the priesthood in Columbus for the Diocese of Belleville on June 14, 1919 by Bishop James Joseph Hartley. He then served as a curate at parishes in Carlyle, Mount Carmel, East St. Louis, and Belleville, all in Illinois. In 1926, Mueller was appointed the founding pastor of Blessed Sacrament Parish in Belleville. From 1930 to 1947, he served as rector of St. Peter's Cathedral Parish in Belleville. The Vatican elevated Mueller to the rank of domestic prelate in 1939.

=== Coadjutor Bishop and Bishop of Sioux City ===
On August 20, 1947, Mueller was appointed coadjutor bishop of Sioux City and titular bishop of Sinda by Pope Pius XII. He received his episcopal consecration at St. Peter's Cathedral on October 16, 1947, from Archbishop Amleto Cicognani, with Bishops Joseph Schlarman and Edward Hunkeler serving as co-consecrators.

On the death of Bishop Edmond Heelan on September 20, 1948, Mueller automatically succeeded him as the third bishop of Sioux City. As bishop, Mueller built several new schools, churches, and other parish facilities. He also attended all four sessions of the Second Vatican Council in Rome between 1962 and 1965.

=== Retirement and legacy ===
On October 20, 1970, Pope Paul VI accepted Mueller's resignation as bishop of Sioux City and appointed him as titular bishop of Simitthu. He resigned his titular see on January 13, 1971.

Joseph Mueller died on August 9, 1981, in Sioux City at age 86.
