= St. Edmond High School (Fort Dodge, Iowa) =

Private secondary school in Fort Dodge, Iowa, United States

Location
- 501 North 22nd Street; Fort Dodge, (Webster County), Iowa 50501-3534; United States
- Coordinates: 42°30′41″N 94°10′2″W

Information
- Type: Private, coeducational
- Motto: "Where Values and Academics Meet"
- Religious affiliation: Christian
- Denomination: Roman Catholic
- School code: 69
- Principal: Tabitha Acree-Elementary Principal, Maury Ruble-Middle/High School Principal
- Grades: Preschool-12
- Colors: Kelly green and white
- Fight song: Go Gaels
- Athletics conference: North Central
- Mascot: Gael
- Team name: Gaels
- Accreditation: National Catholic Education Association
- Tuition: K-5th $7,735, 6-8th $8,150, 9-12th $8,920
- Affiliation: Roman Catholic Diocese of Sioux City
- Website: School website

St. Edmond High School is a private, Roman Catholic high school in Fort Dodge, Iowa, United States. It is located in the Roman Catholic Diocese of Sioux City.

== Background ==
St. Edmond was named in honor of Bishop Edmond Heelan, Bishop of the Sioux City Diocese from 1918 to 1948. The school nickname is the "Gaels".

== Athletics ==
The Gaels compete in the North Central Conference in the following sports:

- Cross country
- Volleyball
- Football
- Basketball
  - Boys' 2000 Class 2A State Champions
- Wrestling
- Track and field
  - Boys' 2009 Class 2A State Champions
  - Boys' 2011 Class 2A State Champions
- Golf
- Tennis
  - Boys' 2013 Class 1A State Champions
- Baseball
  - 2009 Class 2A State Champions
- Softball

== Notable alumni ==
- Jim Hoft, founder of the Gateway Pundit

== See also ==
- List of high schools in Iowa
