= Frank Henry Greteman =

American prelate (1907–1987)

His Excellency, The Most Reverend Frank H. Greteman STL, JCL, DD
- Bishop of Sioux City; Titular Bishop of Vissalsa
- Church: Roman Catholic Church
- See: Diocese of Sioux City
- In office: October 15, 1970 – June 15, 1983
- Predecessor: Joseph Maximilian Mueller
- Successor: Lawrence Donald Soens
- Previous posts: Auxiliary Bishop of Sioux City; 1965 to 1970

Orders
- Ordination: December 8, 1932 by Francesco Marchetti Selvaggiani
- Consecration: May 26, 1965 by Egidio Vagnozzi

Personal details
- Born: December 25, 1907 Willey, Iowa, US
- Died: March 21, 1987 (aged 79) Palm Beach, Florida, US
- Education: Loras College; Pontifical North American College; Catholic University of America
- Motto: Emitte spiritum tuum (Let out your spirit)

Styles of Frank Henry Greteman
- Reference style: The Most Reverend
- Spoken style: Your Excellency
- Religious style: Monsignor
- Posthumous style: none

Frank Henry Greteman (December 25, 1907 – March 21, 1987) was an American prelate of the Roman Catholic Church who served as bishop of the Diocese of Sioux City in Iowa from 1970 to 1983. He previously served as an auxiliary bishop of the same diocese from 1965 to 1970,

== Biography ==
=== Early life ===
Frank Greteman was born on December 25, 1907, in Willey, Iowa, to Bernard and Mary (née Meissner) Greteman. He graduated from Loras College in 1929 with a Bachelor of Arts degree. Greteman then attended the Pontifical North American College in Rome, earning a Licentiate of Sacred Theology in 1933.

=== Priesthood ===
Greteman was ordained a priest by Cardinal Francesco Marchetti Selvaggiani for the Diocese of Sioux City in Rome on December 8, 1932. After his ordination, he served as a curate at St. Augustine Parish in Spokane, Washington, until 1935.

Greteman earned a Licentiate of Canon Law from The Catholic University of America in Washington, D.C., in 1937. Returning to Iowa, Greteman served as pastor in the following Iowa parishes:

- Assumption in Merrill (1937–1941)
- St. Michael in Sioux City (1941–1950)
- SS. Peter & Paul in Carroll (1950–1964)
- Holy Spirit in Carroll (1964–1965).

The Vatican raised Greteman to the rank of domestic prelate in 1953; he was named vicar general of the diocese in 1965.

=== Auxiliary Bishop and Bishop of Sioux City ===
On April 14, 1965, Greteman was appointed auxiliary bishop of Sioux City and titular bishop of Vissalsa by Pope Paul VI. Greteman received his episcopal consecration on May 26, 1965, from Archbishop Egidio Vagnozzi, with Archbishop James Byrne and Bishop Joseph Mueller serving as co-consecrators.

Following the resignation of Bishop Mueller, Paul VI named Greteman as the fourth bishop of Sioux City on October 15, 1970. The main focus of his episcopate was Catholic education. He ordained Archbishop Dennis Schnurr of Cincinnati as a bishop.

=== Retirement and legacy ===
Upon reaching the mandatory retirement age of 75, Greteman submitted his letter of resignation to Pope John Paul II in December 1982. The pope accepted his resignation on August 17, 1983, and named Reverend Lawrence Soens as his successor.

Frank Greteman died in Palm Beach, Florida, on March 21, 1987, at age 79.
