= Philip Joseph Garrigan =

Irish-born prelate

His Excellency, The Right Reverend Philip Joseph Garrigan D.D.
- Bishop of Sioux City
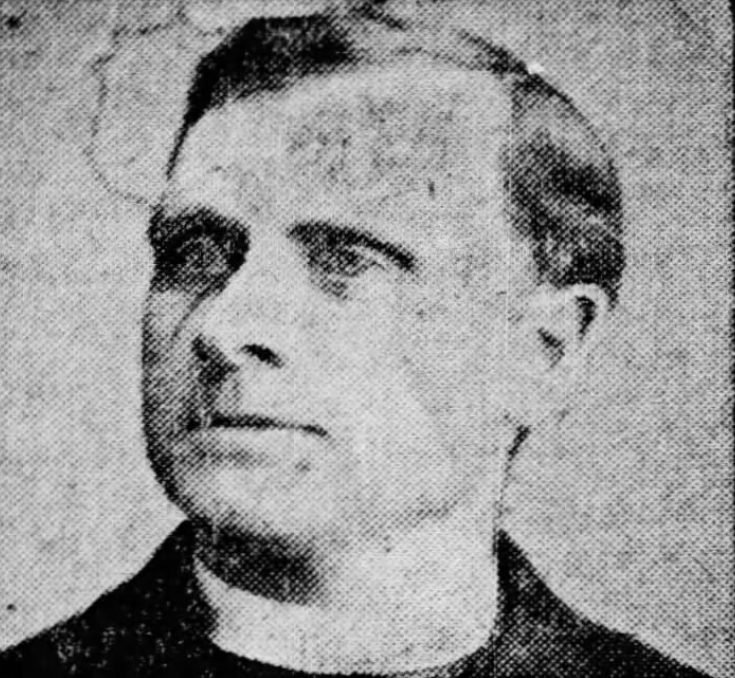
- Church: Roman Catholic Church
- See: Diocese of Sioux City
- In office: June 18, 1902 – October 14, 1919
- Successor: Edmond Heelan

Orders
- Ordination: June 11, 1870 by David William Bacon
- Consecration: May 25, 1902 by Thomas Daniel Beaven

Personal details
- Born: September 8, 1840 County Cavan, Ireland
- Died: October 14, 1919 (aged 79) Sioux City, Iowa, U.S.
- Education: St. Charles College (Maryland); St. Joseph's Seminary and College
- Motto: Dominus illuminatio mea (The Lord is my light)

Philip Joseph Garrigan (September 8, 1840 – October 14, 1919) was an Irish-born prelate of the Roman Catholic Church who served as the first bishop of the Diocese of Sioux City in Iowa from 1902 to until his death in 1919.

== Biography ==
=== Early life ===
Philip Garrigan was born on September 8, 1840, in the Whitegate, Lisduff, Virginia area of County Cavan, Ireland. When he was still a boy, the Garrigan family immigrated to the United States, settling in Lowell, Massachusetts. He received his elementary education in the Lowell public schools, then went to Ellicott City, Maryland to study the classics at St. Charles's College. After finishing at St. Charles, Garrigan studied philosophy and theology at St. Joseph's Provincial Seminary in Troy, New York,

=== Priesthood ===
Garrigan was ordained to the priesthood for the Diocese of Springfield in Massachusetts in Troy by Bishop David Bacon on June 11, 1870. After his ordination, the diocese assigned Garrigan as curate of St. John's Parish in Worcester, Massachusetts. In 1873, he returned to St. Joseph's Seminary to serve as its director.

Garrigan came back to Massachusetts in 1875 to serve as pastor of St. Bernard's Parish in Fitchburg, Massachusetts. In 1888, he was appointed as the first vice-rector of the Catholic University of America in Washington, D.C.

=== Bishop of Sioux City ===
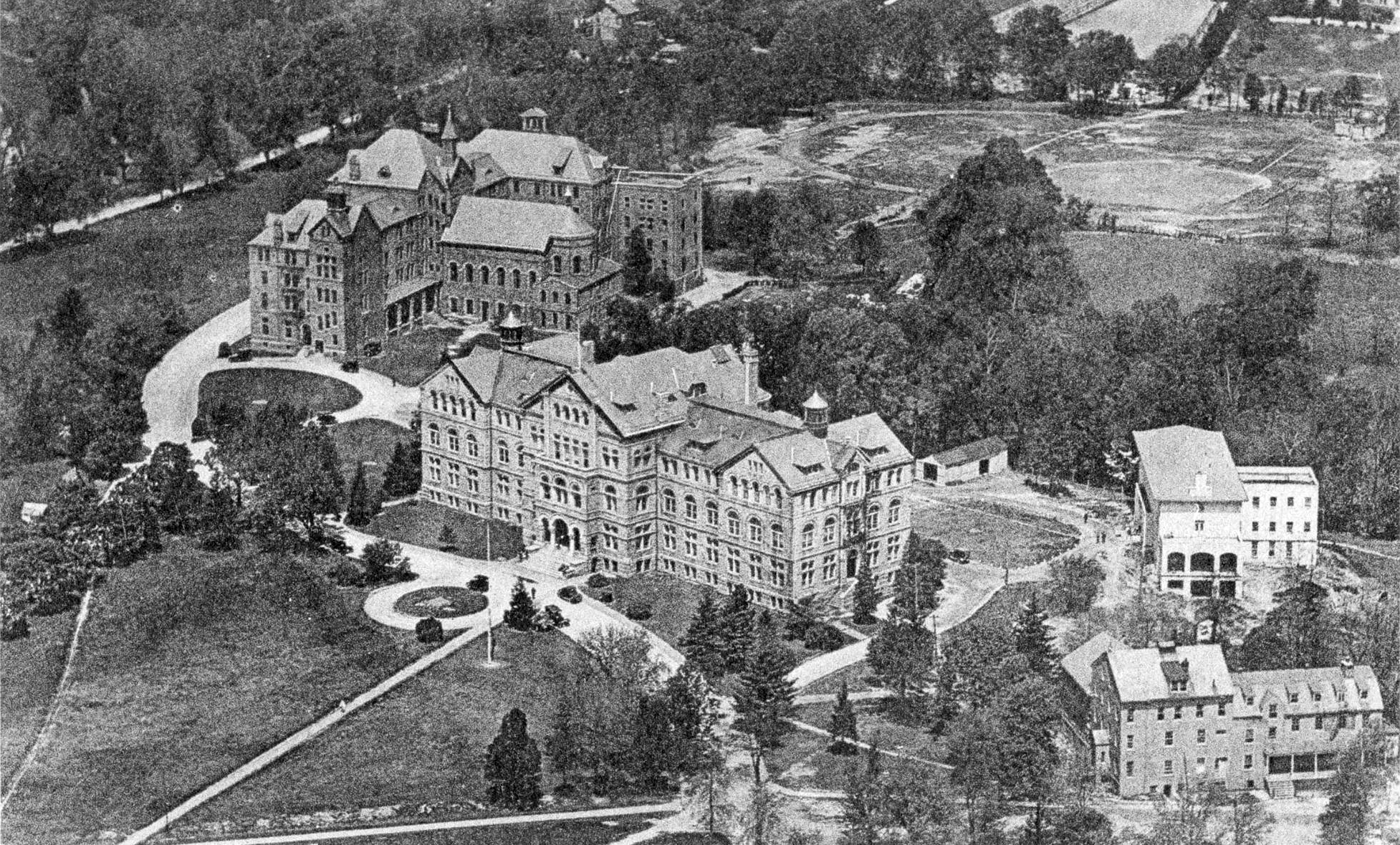
Catholic University of America, Washington, D.C. (1920)

Pope Leo XIII appointed Garrigan as bishop of Sioux City on March 21, 1902. He was consecrated at St. Michael's Cathedral by Bishop T.D. Beaven in Springfield, Massachusetts, on May 25, 1902. Garrigan was installed in Sioux City, Iowa, on June 18, 1902.

Garrigan was a member of the National Geographic Society and the American Irish Historical Society. He authored the article on the Diocese of Sioux City for the Catholic Encyclopedia. In 1916, Garrigan experienced a severe case of food poisoning at a banquet honoring Bishop George Mundelein in Chicago; it would affect Garrigan's health for the rest of his life.

=== Death and legacy ===
Philip Garrigan died in Sioux City, Iowa on October 4, 1919, at age 79. Bishop Garrigan High School in Algona, Iowa, was named after him.

Catholic Church titles
Preceded by None	Bishop of Sioux City; 1902-1919	Succeeded by Edmond Heelan
