= Diocese of Sioux City =

Latin Catholic ecclesiastical jurisdiction in Iowa, USA

Diocese of Sioux City Diœcesis Siopolitanensis
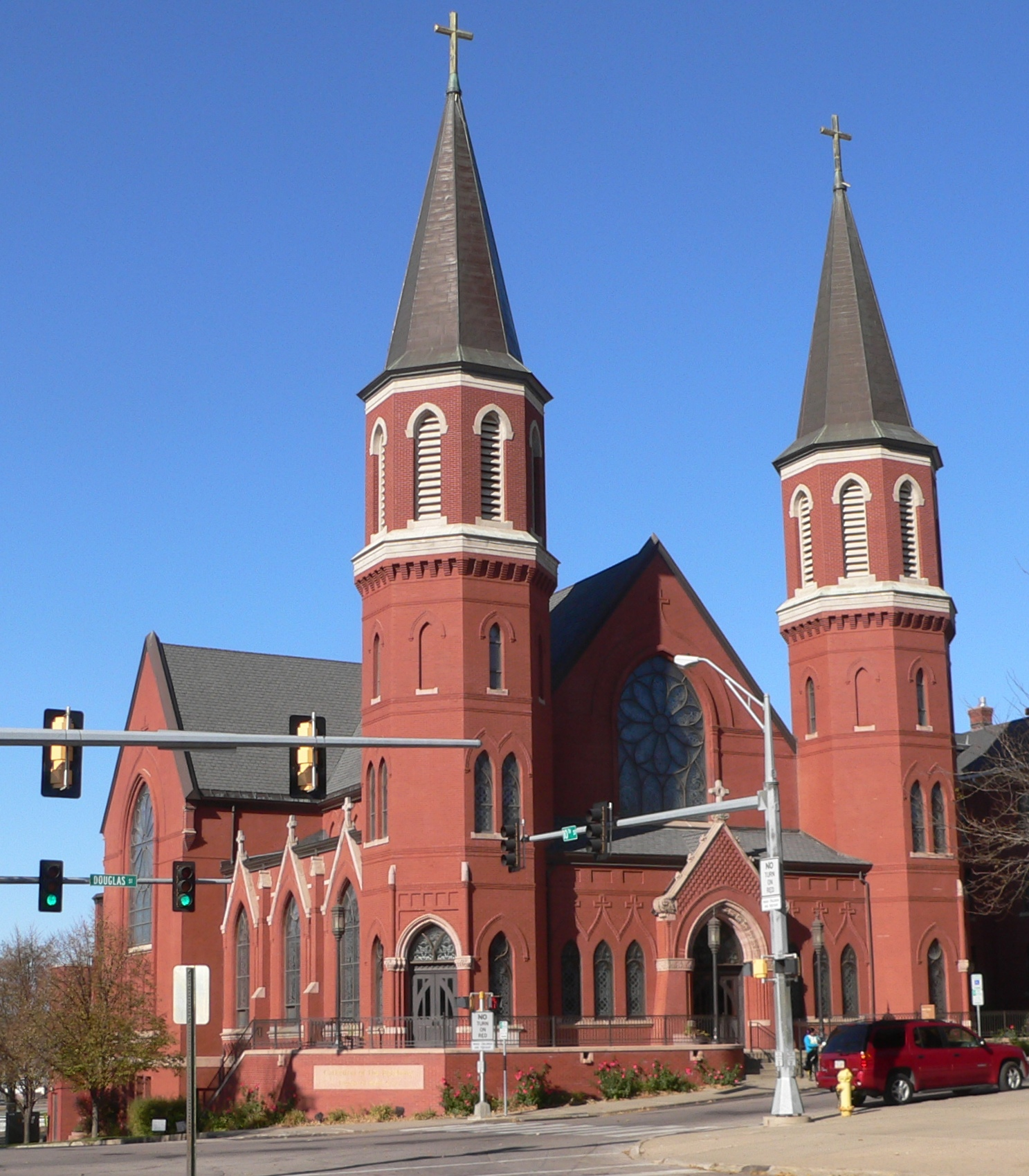
- Cathedral of the Epiphany

- Coat of arms

Location
- Country: United States
- Territory: 24 Counties in the Northwest quadrant of Iowa
- Ecclesiastical province: Dubuque
- Coordinates: 42°30′02″N 96°24′23″W

Statistics
- Area: 14,518 sq mi (37,600 km^{2})
- Population: Total; Catholics: (as of 2020); 455,293; 85,516 (18.8%)
- Parishes: 73

Information
- Denomination: Catholic
- Sui iuris church: Latin Church
- Rite: Roman Rite
- Established: January 15, 1902 (124 years ago)
- Cathedral: Cathedral of the Epiphany
- Patron saint: Our Lady of Guadalupe
- Secular priests: 92 (diocesan); 2 (religious Orders); 53 Permanent Deacons

Current leadership
- Pope: Leo XIV
- Bishop: John Edward Keehner
- Metropolitan Archbishop: Thomas Robert Zinkula
- Bishops emeritus: R. Walker Nickless

Map
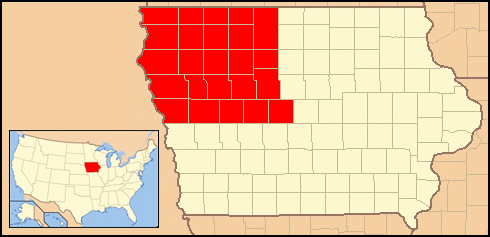

Website
- scdiocese.org

The Diocese of Sioux City (Latin: Diœcesis Siopolitanensis) is the Latin Church diocese for the northwestern quarter of the state of Iowa in the United States. It is a suffragan see of the Archdiocese of Dubuque. The cathedral parish for this diocese is the Epiphany and the see city is Sioux City.

The Diocese of Sioux City comprises 24 counties in northwestern Iowa, covering 14,518 square miles (37,600 km^{2}).

== History ==
=== 1800 to 1900 ===
The first Catholic missionaries arrived in the Iowa area during the early 1830s. They were under the supervision of the Diocese of St. Louis. In 1837, the Vatican erected the Diocese of Dubuque, covering Iowa and adjoining territories. Bishop Mathias Loras of Dubuque in 1856 erected Corpus Christi Parish in Fort Dodge. It was the first parish in the present-day Diocese of Sioux City.Sioux City in 1867 received its first resident priest, turning a mission church into St. Mary's Parish.A second St. Mary's Parish was founded in Storm Lake in 1871 and its church was dedicated in 1872.

The Sisters of Mercy in 1890 opened St. Joseph Mercy Hospital in Sioux City. Today it is part of UnityPoint Health – St. Luke’s – Downtown. In 1897, the Sisters of St. Benedict of Sioux City was authorized as a new religious order by the Vatican.

=== 1900 to 1950 ===
On July 24, 1900, Pope Leo XIII erected the new Diocese of Sioux City by separating 24 counties in northwestern Iowa from the Archdiocese of Dubuque. At that time, the Catholic population of the diocese was approximately 50,000.

The pope appointed Philip Garrigan, vice rector of the Catholic University of America in Washington, D.C., as the first bishop of the new diocese.Garrigan designated the uncompleted St. Mary's Church in Sioux City as the cathedral for the diocese.

In 1902, the Sisters of Mercy opened the St. Joseph School of Nursing in Sioux City. The Cathedral of the Ephiphany was dedicated in 1904. The Benedictine Sisters in 1907 opened St. Vincent Hospital in Sioux City.It is also part of UnityPoint Health – St. Luke’s – Downtown. The Sisters of St. Francis in 1910 opened St. Anthony's Home in Sioux City for orphans and other children needing a home.

During his tenure as bishop, Garrigan visited all the parishes of the diocese. He authored the article on the Diocese of Sioux City for the Catholic Encyclopedia.

After Garrigan died in 1919, Pope Benedict XV named Auxiliary Bishop Edmond Heelan of Sioux City as his successor in 1920. During his term as bishop, Heelan greatly expanded Catholic education in the diocese. In 1929, Heelan donated land in Sioux City to the Sisters of St. Francis for the establishment of Briar Cliff College for women. Today it is Briar Cliff University. In 1947, Pope Pius XII named Joseph Mueller of the Diocese of Belleville as coadjutor bishop to assist Heelan. When Heelan died in 1948, Mueller became bishop of Sioux City.

=== 1950 to 2000 ===
During his 22-year-long tenure, Mueller built several new schools, churches, and other parish facilities. After Mueller retired as bishop of Sioux City in 1970 Pope Paul VI appointed Auxiliary Bishop Frank Greteman of Sioux City as its fourth bishop. The primary focus of his episcopate was Catholic education. Greteman retired as bishop of Sioux City in 1982.

In 1983, Pope John Paul II appointed Lawrence D. Soens of the Diocese of Davenport as the next bishop of Sioux City. While Soens was bishop, he established the Ministry 2000 program, the Priests Retirement Fund, and some youth ministry programs.

In 1997, John Paul II named Daniel DiNardo from the Diocese of Pittsburgh as coadjutor bishop to assist Soens. When Soens retired as bishop of Sioux City in 1998, DiNardo succeeded him.While bishop, DiNardo oversaw a $14 million capital campaign for the diocese.

=== 2000 to present ===
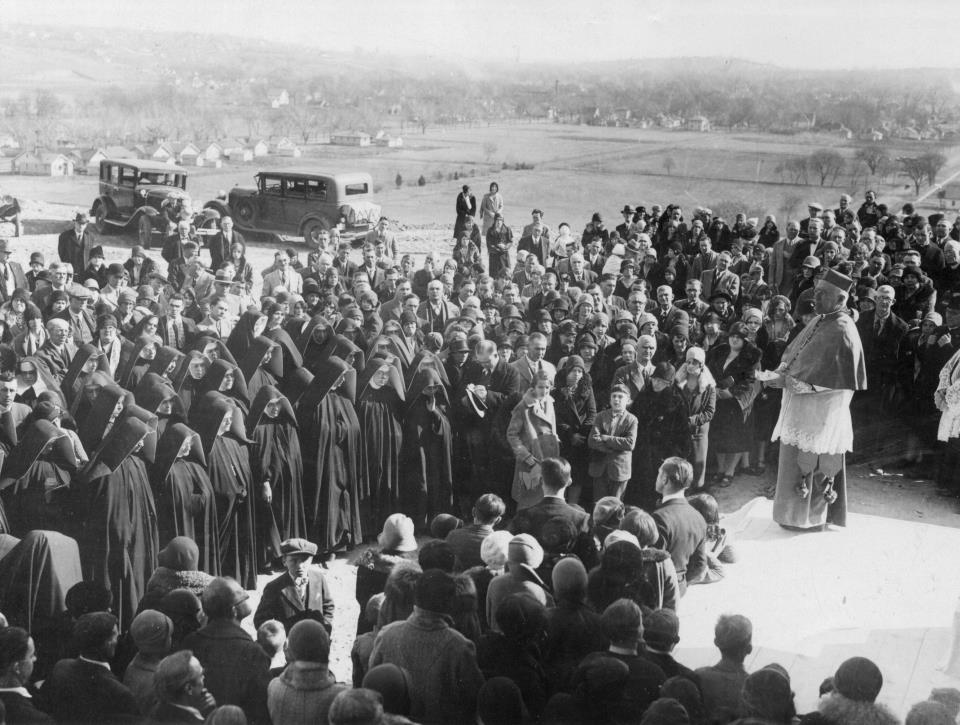
Dedication of Briar Cliff College, Sioux City, Iowa (1930)

In 2004, Pope Benedict XVI appointed DiNardo as coadjutor archbishop of the Archdiocese of Galveston-Houston. To replaced DiNardo in Sioux City, Benedict XVI appointed R. Walker Nickless of the Archdiocese of Denver as the seventh bishop of the diocese.David Newbrough, the chief financial officer of the Bishop Heelan Catholic school system, sued the school and the diocese in 2013. He claimed that he had been fired because he was not a Catholic.The lawsuit was dismissed in 2015, with the judge citing federal law allowing religious institution to discriminate in employment on religious grounds.

In 2015, Nickless granted permission to the Ministry Institute of Christ the Servant to identify as a Catholic institute. The Ministry Institute was affiliated with Briar Cliff University. In 2016, the diocese announced plans to consolidate 41 parishes due a shortage of priests and decreased mass attendance. Some of the redudent worship sites became oratories and sites for prayer services, funerals, and weddings, but not for weekly masses. Most of the affected parishes were in rural areas of the diocese.

After Nickless retired in 2025, Pope Francis named John Keehner Jr. from the Diocese of Youngstown as bishop of Sioux Falls on February 12, 2025.

=== Sexual abuse ===
In 1992, after receiving multiple sexual abuse allegations, the Diocese of Sioux City forced Rev. George McFadden to undergo treatment and retire from his pastoral position. However, after finishing treatment, the diocese assigned him to hear confessions and celebrate mass at the cathedral. McFadden was finally suspended from all ministerial functions in 2002. At that time, Bishop DiNardo said it had been a mistake in 1992 to allow McFadden to continue in ministry. By August 2004, the diocese had been served with 20 lawsuits alleging abuse by McFadden. The diocese had settled 16 of these lawsuits by March 2005; by July 2005, the number of lawsuits had reached 26.

In June 2005, the diocese was sued by a man who accused Bishop Soens of fondling him. The alleged abuse started in 1963 when Soens was director at Regina Catholic High School in Iowa City. In November 2008, the diocesan review board reported that there were several credible accusations against Soens of sexually abusing minors. Thirty-one men had accused him of abusing them between 1950 and 1983. His case was referred to the Vatican for further action.

In October 2018, the diocese admitted that for several decades it had concealed sexual abuse committed by Rev. Jerome Coyle. It stated that Coyle had abused at least 50 boys during his time as priest. Coyle confessed his history of abuse to Soens in 1986, who placed him on a six-month medical leave, but did not report the admission to police or suspend him. The diocese eventually forbade Coyle from publicly functioning as a priest. However, he still retained his title and continued to collect financial assistance from the diocese while living in Albuquerque, New Mexico. The diocese did not notify anyone of his admission nor of allegations against Coyle, and it did not take any further action against him.

In October 2019, Samuel Heinrichs sued the diocese, claiming that he had been physically and sexually abused when he was ten years old by Rev. Dale Koster. The abuse occurred during the 1960's at Our Lady of Mount Carmel Parish in Carroll. The stress caused Heinrichs to develop an ulcer when he was in the fifth grade. The diocese and Heinrichs settled the lawsuit in 2021.

== Bishops ==
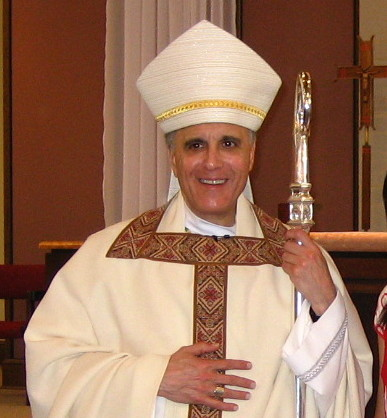
Archbishop DiNardo (2006)

=== Bishops of Sioux City ===
1. Philip Joseph Garrigan (1902–1919)
2. Edmond Heelan (1920–1948)
  - Thomas Lawrence Noa (Coadjutor 1946–1947), appointed Bishop of Marquette before succession
3. Joseph Maximilian Mueller (1948–1970; Coadjutor 1947–1948)
4. Frank Henry Greteman (1970–1983)
5. Lawrence Donald Soens (1983–1998)
6. Daniel N. DiNardo (1998–2004), appointed Coadjutor Bishop and later Coadjutor Archbishop and Archbishop of Galveston-Houston (elevated to Cardinal in 2007)
7. R. Walker Nickless (2005–2025)
8. John Edward Keehner (2025-present)

=== Auxiliary bishops ===
- Edmond Heelan (1918–1920), appointed Bishop of Sioux City
- Frank Henry Greteman (1965–1970), appointed Bishop of Sioux City

=== Other diocesan priest who became bishop ===
Dennis Marion Schnurr, appointed Bishop of Duluth in 2001 and later Archbishop of Cincinnati

== Education ==
=== High schools ===
School	Location	Mascot
Bishop Garrigan High School	Algona	Golden Bears
Bishop Heelan High School	Sioux City	Crusaders
Gehlen Catholic School	Le Mars	Jays
Kuemper Catholic School	Carroll	Knights
St. Edmond Catholic School	Fort Dodge	Gaels
Remsen St. Mary's School	Remsen	Hawks
St. Mary's School	Storm Lake	Panthers

=== Closed schools ===
School	Location	Mascot	Fate
Corpus Christi	Fort Dodge	Celts	Consolidated with Sacred Heart High School, Fort Dodge, to form St. Edmond's, Fort Dodge, in 1955
Holy Family	Lidderdale	Unknown	Absorbed by Kuemper Catholic, Carroll, in 1955
Holy Name	Marcus	Wildcats	Closed in 1964
Immaculate Conception	Cherokee	Irish	Closed in 1969
Messenger Ryan	Boone	Raiders	Closed in 1970, succeeded Sacred Heart, Boone
Our Lady of Good Counsel	Fonda	Irish	Closed in 1975
Our Lady of Mount Carmel	Mount Carmel	Cougars	Absorbed by Kuemper Catholic in 1958
Presentation Academy	Whittemore	Crusaders	Consolidated with St. Cecilia, Algona to form Bishop Garrigan, Algona, in 1959
Sacred Heart	Boone	Spartans	Closed in 1967, succeeded by Messenger Ryan, Boone
Sacred Heart	Early	Sabers	Absorbed by St. Mary's, Storm Lake, in 1967
Sacred Heart	Fort Dodge	Irish	Consolidated with Corpus Christi Catholic, Fort Dodge, to form St. Edmond's, Fort Dodge, in 1955
Sacred Heart	Pocahontas	Eagles	Closed in 1970
Sacred Heart	Templeton	Aces	Absorbed by Kuemper Catholic in 1959
St. Ann's	Vail	Eagles	Absorbed by Kuemper Catholic in 1960
St. Bernard's	Breda	Bobcats	Absorbed by Kuemper Catholic in 1979
St. Cecilia's	Algona	Blue Knights	Consolidated with St. Cecilia, Algona to form Bishop Garrigan in 1959
St. Columbkille's	Varina	Black Hawks	Closed in 1961
St. John's	Arcadia	Bears	Absorbed by Kuemper Catholic in 1995
St. John's	Bancroft	Johnnies	Absorbed by Bishop Garriganin 1989
St. Joseph's	Ashton	Ramblers	Closed in 1967
St. Joseph's	Bode	Trojans	Absorbed by Bishop Garrigan in 1970
St. Joseph's	Granville	Cardinals	Consolidated with St. Mary's, Alton to form Spalding Catholic, Granville, in 1962
St. Joseph's	Le Mars	Joe Hawks	Merged with St. James School, Le Mars (no high school) to form Gehlen Catholic, Le Mars, in 1952
St. Joseph's	Salix	Wildcats	Absorbed by Bishop Heelan, Sioux City, in 1960
St. Mary's	Alton	Blue Jax	Consolidated with St. Joseph's, Granville to form Spalding Catholic in 1962
St. Mary's	Emmetsburg	Irish	Closed in 1968
St. Mary's	Larchwood	Traveliers	Closed in 1968
St. Matthew's	Clare	Irish	Absorbed by St. Edmond's, Fort Dodge, in 1961
St. Patrick's	Danbury	Bluejays	Closed in 1968
Spalding Catholic	Granville	Spartans	Absorbed by Gehlen Catholic in 2013
Trinity Catholic	Sioux City	Crusaders	Became Bishop Heelan in 1949
