= 2026 Iowa Attorney General election =

- November 3, 2026

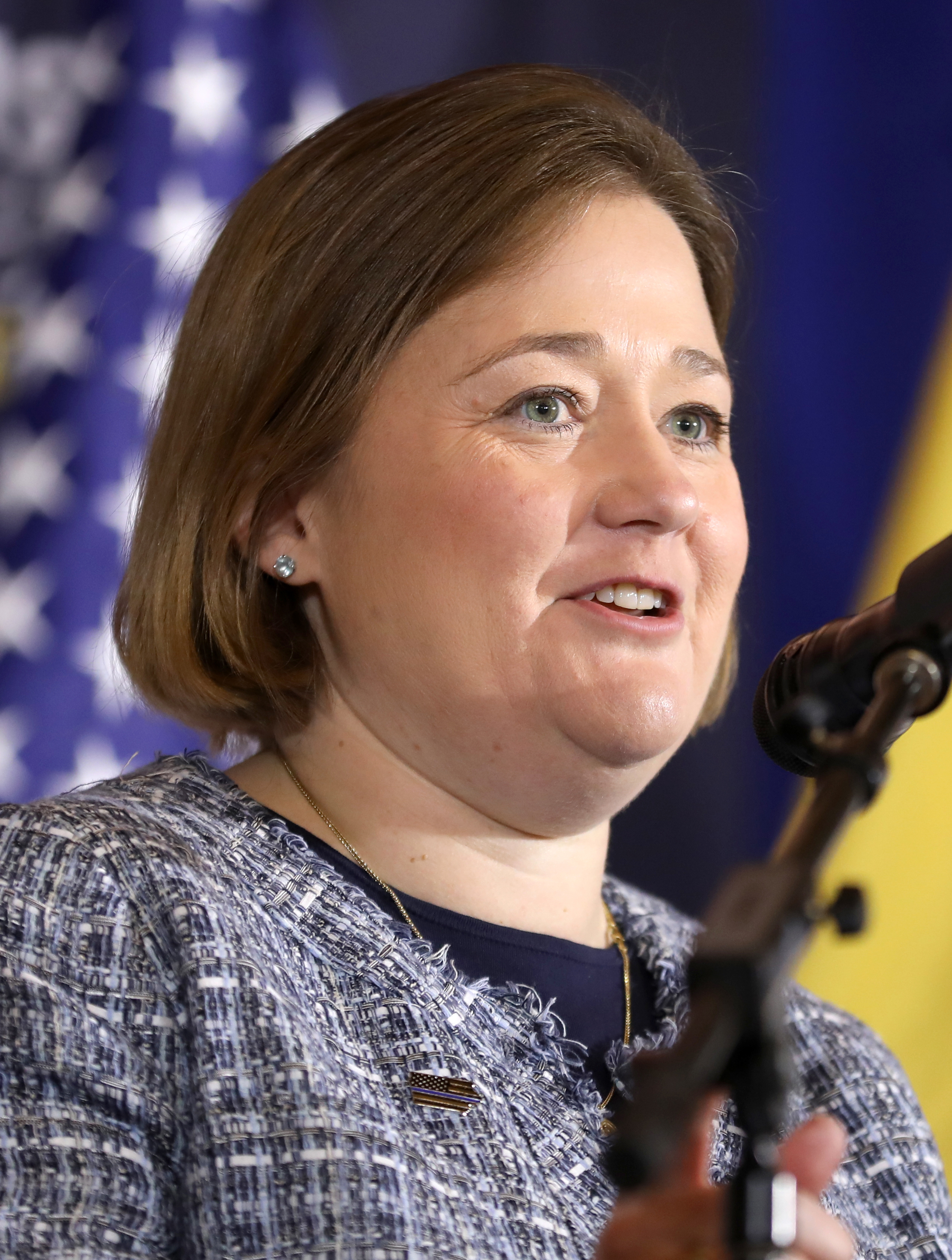
Candidate	Nathan Willems	Brenna Bird
Party	Democratic	Republican
Popular vote	683,158	658,221
Percentage	50.9%	49.1%
- Willems: 50–60% 60–70% 70–80% Bird: 50–60% 60–70% 70–80% 80–90%
Attorney General before election
Brenna Bird
Republican
Elected Attorney General
Nathan Willems
Democratic

The 2026 Iowa Attorney General election was held on Tuesday, November 3, 2026, to elect the Attorney General of Iowa. Incumbent Brenna Bird was first elected in 2022, unseating longtime Democratic incumbent Tom Miller, who had sought an 11th term. Bird had originally considered a run for governor, but opted to seek re-election instead. Primary elections were held on June 2, 2026.

Bird would go on to narrowly lose re-election to Nathan Willems, a former state representative, flipping the office back to Democratic control.

== Republican primary ==
=== Candidates ===
==== Nominee ====
- Brenna Bird, incumbent attorney general (2023–present)

=== Endorsements ===
Brenna Bird

U.S. representatives

- Randy Feenstra, IA-04 (2021–2027) and candidate for governor in 2026

State legislators

- Mike Bousselot, state senator from the 21st district (2023–present)

Organizations

- Maggie's List

=== Results ===
Republican primary results
Party	Candidate	Votes	%
Republican	Brenna Bird (incumbent)	181,254	99.1
Write-in		1,581	0.9
Total votes		182,835	100.0

== Democratic primary ==
=== Candidates ===
==== Nominee ====
- Nathan Willems, former state representative from the 29th district (2009–2013)

==== Declined ====
- Tom Miller, former attorney general of Iowa (1979–1991, 1995–2023) (endorsed Willems)

=== Endorsements ===
Nathan Willems

U.S. representatives

- Bruce Braley, former IA-01 (2007–2015)
- Dave Loebsack, former IA-02 (2007–2021)
- Dave Nagle, former IA-03 (1987–1993)

Statewide officials

- Tom Miller, former attorney general of Iowa (1979–1991, 1995–2023)

State legislators

- Claire Celsi, state senator from SD-16 (2019–2025) (deceased)
- Jennifer Konfrst, minority leader of the Iowa House of Representatives (2021–2025) from HD-32 (2019–present) and candidate for IA-03 in 2026
- Liz Mathis, state senator from SD-34 (2011–present) and nominee for IA-02 in 2024
- Pat Murphy, former state representative from HD-99 (1989–2015)

Party officials

- Troy Price, former chair of the Iowa Democratic Party (2017–2020)

Labor unions

- Iowa Federation of Labor, AFL-CIO
- SEIU Healthcare Minnesota & Iowa
- Teamsters Local 238

=== Results ===
Democratic primary results
Party	Candidate	Votes	%
Democratic	Nathan Willems	175,646	99.8
Write-in		380	0.2
Total votes		176,026	100.0

== General election ==
=== Predictions ===
Source	Ranking	As of
Sabato's Crystal Ball	Tossup	October 29, 2026

=== Post-primary endorsements ===
Brenna Bird (R)

Executive branch officials

- Donald Trump, president of the United States (2017–2021, 2025–present)

U.S. senators

- Ted Cruz, Texas (2013–present)
Nathan Willems (D)

Organizations

- End Citizens United

=== Polling ===
Poll source	Date(s) administered	Sample size (Note: Key: A – all adults RV – registered voters LV – likely voters V – unclear)	Margin of error	Brenna Bird (R)	Nathan Willems (D)	Undecided
Cygnal (R) (Note: Poll sponsored by Iowans for Tax Relief)	September 9–11, 2026	500 (LV)	± 4.38%	40%	40%	21%
Cygnal (R)	June 16–19, 2026	600 (LV)	± 4.0%	44%	39%	17%
Global Strategy Group (D) (Note: Poll conducted for the Democratic Attorneys General Association)	April 6–9, 2026	600 (LV)	± 4.0%	45%	43%	12%
Fund for Economic; Independence (R) (Note: Poll sponsored by Fund for Economic Independence, which supports Bird)	October 30 – November 2, 2025	1,056 (LV)	—	41%	41%	18%
Fund for Economic; Independence (R)	September 9–11, 2025	600 (LV)	—	39%	46%	15%

=== Results ===
2026 Iowa Attorney General election
Party	Candidate	Votes	%	±%
Democratic	Nathan Willems	681,107	50.9%	+1.8%
Republican	Brenna Bird (incumbent)	657,405	49.1%	−1.7%
Write-in		1,338,512	100.0	
Total votes			100.0	
Democratic gain from Republican				

== Notes ==
Partisan clients
