= Maharam =

Maharam (Hebrew: מהר"ם) is an acronym of the words ...מורנו הרב רבי מ (Morenu Ha-Rav rabi M..., Our teacher the Rabbi M...), a pattern also used for other names. Since many Rabbis were referred to as Maharam, an addition, usually a name of a place or a surname is generally used to differentiate between them. Notable people with the name include:

== Acronym ==
- Meir Eisenstadt (Maharam Ash), Rabbi Meir EisenstadtPoland, Germany, c. 1670–1744
- Meir Eisenstaedter (Maharam Ash, 1780–1852), Rabbi Meir Eisenstaedter (Hungary, 1780–1861)
- Meir Lublin (Maharam Lublin, 1558–1616), Rabbi Meir Lublin
- Meir of Rothenburg (Maharam of Rothenburg), Rabbi Meir of Rothenburg ob der Tauber
- Meir Shapiro (Maharam Shapiro, 1887–1933), Rabbi Meir Yehuda Shapiro of Lublin, creator of the Daf Yomi
- Meïr b. Jacob Schiff (Maharam Schiff), Rabbi Meïr b. Jacob Schiff
- Mordecai Benet (Maharam Benet, 1753–1829), Rabbi Mordecai Benet (Moravia
- Moses Alashkar (Maharam Alashkar, 1466–1542), posek quoted extensively by R. Chaim Benbenishti
- Moses Halevi Mintz (Maharam Mintz), Rabbi Moses Halevi Mintz (Germany, 1415–Poland, 1480)
- Moshe Schick (Maharam Schick, 1807–1879), Hungarian rabbi

== Surname ==
- Dorothy Maharam (1917–2014), American mathematician behind Maharam's theorem

== See also ==
- Maharam's theorem, a mathematical theorem regarding decomposability of measure spaces
- Maharam algebra
- Maharsha, a similar acronym
