= West Sioux Community School District =

Public school district in Hawarden, Iowa, United States

Coordinates: 43.001006°N 96.473301°W

Location
- Hawarden, Iowa Sioux County and Plymouth County United States
- Coordinates: 43.001006, -96.473301

District information
- Type: Local school district
- Grades: K–12
- Established: 1958
- Superintendent: Steve Grond
- Schools: 4
- Budget: $14,169,000 (2020-21)
- NCES District ID: 1931290

Students and staff
- Students: 779 (2022-23)
- Teachers: 64.80 FTE
- Staff: 76.22 FTE
- Student–teacher ratio: 12.02
- Athletic conference: War Eagle
- District mascot: Falcons
- Colors: Red, white, and blue

Other information
- Website: www.westsiouxschools.org

West Sioux Community School District, or West Sioux Schools, is a rural public school district headquartered in Hawarden, Iowa. It operates Ireton Elementary School, Hawarden Elementary School, and West Sioux Middle School/High School in Hawarden.

The district is mostly in Sioux County with a small section in Plymouth County. The district includes Hawarden, Ireton, and Chatsworth.

== History ==
The first country school in Sioux County, Iowa, was built by 1869 in Calliope. The educational institution was rebuilt in 1881 and moved in 1883. After the third building burned down, the school relocated again. By the 1890s, Hawarden High School had been built.

A consolidated school district known as the Chatsworth–Hawarden–Ireton Rural Community School District was proposed in 1958. Before the district was established, the name had been changed to West Sioux. The first school board election was as a consolidated school district was held in January 1959. The West Sioux Community School District began operations on July 1, 1959. West Sioux High School was also established in 1959. It began classes in what was the Hawarden High School, and served as the secondary school for the West Sioux Community School District.

At the time of its consolidation, Roger Blake served as superintendent of West Sioux. Doyle Carpenter became superintendent in 1968, and was succeeded by Gerald Bradley in 1973. Bradley served through 1990, and vacated the position by 1991. By 1998, David Looysen had become superintendent at West Sioux. Looysen left West Sioux after four years, and was replaced by Paul Olson. Olson retired after the 2010 school year, and Gary Richardson took on a dual superintendency between MOC–Floyd Valley and West Sioux. Randy Collins became superintendent of West Sioux in 2012, and concurrently served in the same role at Akron–Westfield Community School District. Though Collins remained with Akron–Westfield, he left West Sioux in 2016. Ryan Kramer was named superintendent for the 2016–17 school year, and served as superintendent until 2019. Steve Grond, who was superintendent of Boyden-Hull School District, assumed a dual superintendency at Boyden–Hull and West Sioux in 2020.

== Schools ==
The district operates four schools:

- Hawarden Elementary School, Hawarden
- Ireton Elementary School, Ireton
- West Sioux Middle School, Hawarden
- West Sioux High School, Hawarden

=== West Sioux High School ===
==== Athletics ====
The Falcons compete in the War Eagle Conference in the following sports:

- Cross Country
  - Boys' 2-time State Champions (1961, 1999)
- Volleyball
- Football
  - 2-time State Champions (2017, 2018)
- Bowling
- Basketball
- Wrestling
- Track and Field
- Golf
- Soccer
  - 2025 Boys Class 1A State Champions
- Baseball
- Softball

== Notable alumni ==
- Brian Hansen, former American football punter in the National Football League
- Adam Gregg, American lawyer and politician, 47th lieutenant governor of Iowa (2019–2024; acting lieutenant governor 2017–2019)

== See also ==
- List of school districts in Iowa
- List of high schools in Iowa
