= Hawarden, Iowa =

- City
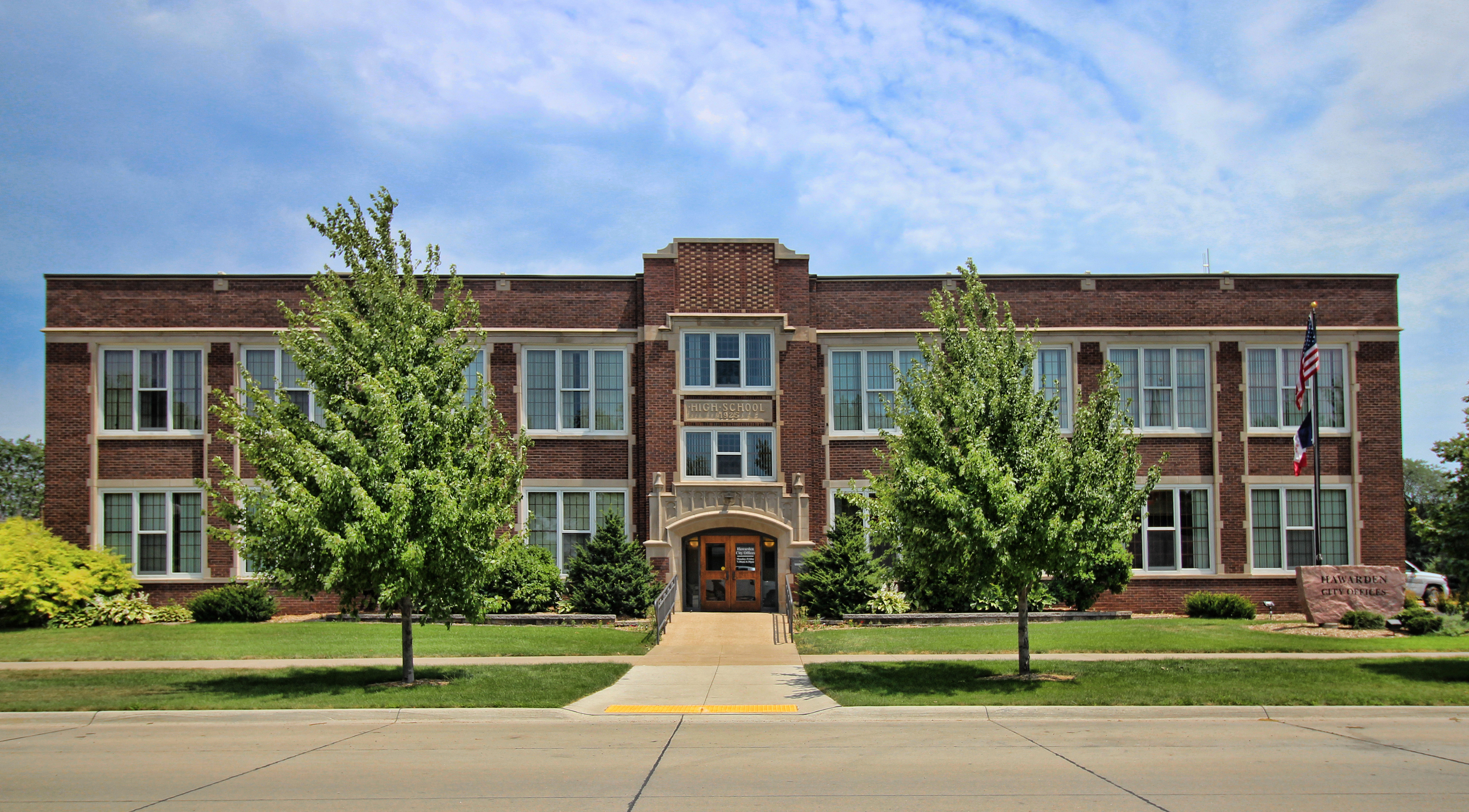
- Current City Hall
- Motto: "Move Forward In Hawarden Iowa"
- Location of Hawarden, Iowa
- Coordinates: 42°59′50″N 96°29′14″W
- Country: United States
- State: Iowa
- County: Sioux
- Incorporated: March 18, 1887

Government
  - Type: Mayor-Council

Area
  - Total: 2.92 sq mi (7.56 km^{2})
  - Land: 2.78 sq mi (7.20 km^{2})
  - Water: 0.14 sq mi (0.35 km^{2})
- Elevation: 1,178 ft (359 m)

Population (2020)
  - Total: 2,700
  - Density: 970.7/sq mi (374.79/km^{2})
- Time zone: UTC−6 (Central (CST))
  - Summer (DST): UTC−5 (CDT)
- ZIP codes: 51011, 51023
- Area code: 712
- FIPS code: 19-35265
- GNIS feature ID: 2394329
- Website: City of Hawarden, Iowa

Hawarden is a city in Sioux County, Iowa, United States. The population was 2,700 at the time of the 2020 census. It is located on the Big Sioux River.

== History ==
=== Calliope and early settlement ===
The origins of Hawarden can be traced to Calliope, an early settlement along the Big Sioux River approximately one mile north of the present city center. Sioux County was organized in 1860, and a settlement developed at Calliope in 1861. A log courthouse was constructed near the river, serving as the center of county government. The settlement was reportedly named by early county organizer Frederick M. Hubbell after a steam-powered calliope he had heard aboard a riverboat.

Calliope served as Sioux County's first county seat, but its position was challenged following the establishment of the Dutch immigrant settlement of Orange City in 1870. Tensions arose between the county's original officeholders and newly elected officials supported by the Dutch community.

In January 1872, a group of Dutch settlers traveled to Calliope by horse-drawn sleighs and forcibly entered the courthouse, removing county records and the county safe. The records were subsequently returned following an agreement concerning the seating of the newly elected officials. Later that year, county voters approved moving the county seat to Orange City, with the transfer formally taking effect in January 1873.

Despite losing the county seat, Calliope continued to grow. A railroad station was established in 1878, and the community developed stores, hotels, and other businesses serving the surrounding agricultural region.

=== Founding of Hawarden ===
The extension of the Chicago and North Western Railway played a central role in Hawarden's establishment. Although a railroad route through Calliope was initially contemplated, the company constructed its station approximately one mile south of the older settlement. A new community developed around the station and railroad facilities.

Hawarden was platted in 1882 by the Western Town Lot Company. Its name was chosen in honor of British statesman William Ewart Gladstone, whose home was at Hawarden Castle in Wales.

The railroad developed extensive facilities at Hawarden, including a roundhouse capable of accommodating approximately 19 locomotives, repair facilities, and hotels serving railroad passengers. Rail transportation contributed to the growth of commercial activity and the movement of agricultural products throughout the region.

=== Rivalry with Calliope and incorporation ===
The growth of Hawarden produced a rivalry with the older settlement of Calliope. In 1882, Calliope incorporated an area that included the emerging community of Hawarden, placing both settlements under a single municipal government.

Disagreements over municipal improvements, business development, and the distribution of public resources led Hawarden residents to seek separation from Calliope. In 1886, a court ruled in favor of Hawarden's request to become a separate municipality. The Hawarden Independent, previously published in Calliope, also relocated to Hawarden that December.

In February 1887, residents voted 97 to 3 in favor of incorporation. Hawarden was officially incorporated on March 18, 1887.

Competition between the communities continued, but Hawarden's position as a railroad center attracted businesses and residents from Calliope. In 1893, the two communities were consolidated into a single incorporated municipality under the name Hawarden. Calliope's post office remained in operation until 1911, and the name continued to be used for the northern portion of Hawarden.

=== Industry and twentieth-century development ===
During the late nineteenth and early twentieth centuries, Hawarden developed as a regional railroad and agricultural center. The Big Sioux River also supported a substantial ice-harvesting industry. Ice cut from the frozen river was stored in large ice houses and distributed to households, businesses, and neighboring communities. The Hawarden Ice Company continued operations into the mid-twentieth century, although natural ice harvesting was eventually replaced by mechanical refrigeration.

Hawarden experienced repeated flooding from Dry Creek, including major floods in 1897 and 1926. On September 17, 1926, approximately 11 inches of rainfall over six hours caused severe flooding throughout the city. More than 250 homes were damaged or destroyed, and one resident died. The disaster prompted renewed efforts to improve drainage and flood control.

During the Great Depression, Hawarden attracted national attention for a local stamp scrip program developed by businessman Charles Zylstra in 1932. The system used locally issued currency requiring the purchase of stamps as it circulated, with the aim of stimulating economic activity. Hawarden's experiment influenced similar programs adopted by other American communities.

== Geography ==
Hawarden is located along the Big Sioux River.

According to the United States Census Bureau, the city has a total area of 3.02 square miles (7.82 km^{2}), of which 2.89 square miles (7.49 km^{2}) is land and 0.13 square miles (0.34 km^{2}) is water.

=== Climate ===
Hawarden is located very near to the center of the North American continent, far removed from any major bodies of water. This lends the area a humid continental climate, with hot, humid summers, cold snowy winters, and wide temperature extremes. Summers can bring daytime temperatures that climb into the 90s Fahrenheit, and winter lows can be well below zero.

Climate data for Hawarden
Month	Jan	Feb	Mar	Apr	May	Jun	Jul	Aug	Sep	Oct	Nov	Dec	Year
Record high °F (°C)	71 (22)	71 (22)	91 (33)	97 (36)	102 (39)	108 (42)	108 (42)	104 (40)	103 (39)	94 (34)	81 (27)	70 (21)	108 (42)
Mean daily maximum °F (°C)	28.7 (−1.8)	35 (2)	47.3 (8.5)	61.7 (16.5)	73.2 (22.9)	82.5 (28.1)	86.2 (30.1)	83.7 (28.7)	76 (24)	63.7 (17.6)	44.8 (7.1)	31.7 (−0.2)	59.5 (15.3)
Mean daily minimum °F (°C)	8.5 (−13.1)	15.3 (−9.3)	25.7 (−3.5)	37.3 (2.9)	49.2 (9.6)	58.5 (14.7)	62.9 (17.2)	60.6 (15.9)	50.1 (10.1)	38 (3)	24.8 (−4.0)	12.8 (−10.7)	37.0 (2.7)
Mean minimum °F (°C)	−26 (−32)	−26 (−32)	−22 (−30)	−2 (−19)	25 (−4)	38 (3)	42 (6)	37 (3)	24 (−4)	12 (−11)	−9 (−23)	−24 (−31)	−26 (−32)
Average precipitation inches (mm)	0.59 (15)	0.62 (16)	2 (51)	2.75 (70)	3.75 (95)	3.61 (92)	3.3 (84)	2.9 (74)	2.42 (61)	1.99 (51)	1.4 (36)	0.66 (17)	25.99 (662)
Source: USTravelWeather.com

== Demographics ==
Historical populations
Year	Pop.	±%
1890	744	—
1900	1,810	+143.3%
1910	2,107	+16.4%
1920	2,491	+18.2%
1930	2,459	−1.3%
1940	2,681	+9.0%
1950	2,625	−2.1%
1960	2,544	−3.1%
1970	2,789	+9.6%
1980	2,722	−2.4%
1990	2,439	−10.4%
2000	2,478	+1.6%
2010	2,546	+2.7%
2020	2,700	+6.0%
Source:"U.S. Census website". United States Census Bureau. and Iowa Data Center; Source: U.S. Decennial Census

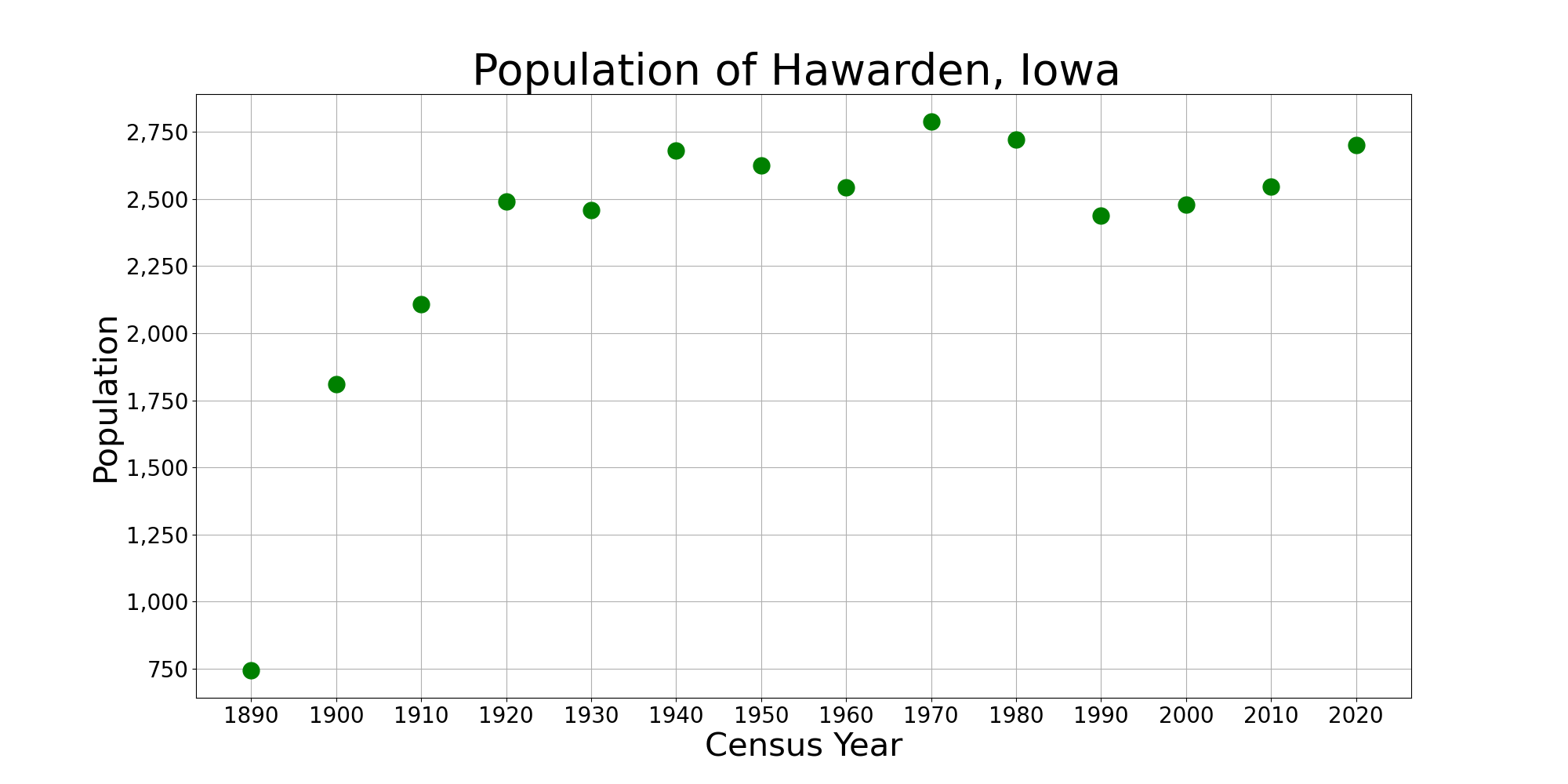
The population of Hawarden, Iowa from US census data

=== 2020 census ===
As of the 2020 census, there were 2,700 people, 1,036 households, and 670 families residing in the city. The population density was 970.7 inhabitants per square mile (374.8/km^{2}). There were 1,123 housing units at an average density of 403.7 per square mile (155.9/km^{2}), of which 7.7% were vacant. The homeowner vacancy rate was 1.1% and the rental vacancy rate was 9.6%.

0.0% of residents lived in urban areas, while 100.0% lived in rural areas.

Of the 1,036 households, 31.4% had children under the age of 18 living in them. Of all households, 47.4% were married-couple households, 5.7% were cohabiting-couple households, 18.2% had a male householder with no spouse or partner present, and 28.7% had a female householder with no spouse or partner present. About 35.3% of households were non-families, 30.9% of all households were made up of individuals, and 16.2% had someone living alone who was 65 years of age or older.

The median age was 38.3 years. 27.3% of residents were under the age of 18 and 19.8% were 65 years of age or older. 30.2% of residents were under the age of 20; 4.5% were between the ages of 20 and 24; 23.3% were from 25 to 44; and 22.3% were from 45 to 64. The gender makeup of the city was 48.8% male and 51.2% female. For every 100 females there were 95.2 males, and for every 100 females age 18 and over there were 92.0 males age 18 and over.

Racial composition as of the 2020 census
Race	Number	Percent
White	1,996	73.9%
Black or African American	5	0.2%
American Indian and Alaska Native	31	1.1%
Asian	2	0.1%
Native Hawaiian and Other Pacific Islander	0	0.0%
Some other race	375	13.9%
Two or more races	291	10.8%
Hispanic or Latino (of any race)	726	26.9%

=== 2010 census ===
As of the census of 2010, there were 2,546 people, 1,020 households, and 667 families living in the city. The population density was 881.0 inhabitants per square mile (340.2/km^{2}). There were 1,152 housing units at an average density of 398.6 per square mile (153.9/km^{2}). The racial makeup of the city was 86.8% White, 0.5% African American, 0.9% Native American, 0.3% Asian, 10.6% from other races, and 0.9% from two or more races. Hispanic or Latino of any race were 20.0% of the population.

There were 1,020 households, of which 29.7% had children under the age of 18 living with them, 53.1% were married couples living together, 7.6% had a female householder with no husband present, 4.6% had a male householder with no wife present, and 34.6% were non-families. 31.8% of all households were made up of individuals, and 16.6% had someone living alone who was 65 years of age or older. The average household size was 2.45 and the average family size was 3.06.

The median age in the city was 39 years. 25.4% of residents were under the age of 18; 8% were between the ages of 18 and 24; 22.9% were from 25 to 44; 23.6% were from 45 to 64; and 20.2% were 65 years of age or older. The gender makeup of the city was 49.2% male and 50.8% female.

=== 2000 census ===
As of the census of 2000, there were 2,478 people, 1,032 households, and 664 families living in the city. The population density was 860.6 inhabitants per square mile (332.3/km^{2}). There were 1,098 housing units at an average density of 381.3 per square mile (147.2/km^{2}). The racial makeup of the city was 93.83% White, 0.32% African American, 0.56% Native American, 0.28% Asian, 3.67% from other races, and 1.33% from two or more races. Hispanic or Latino of any race were 6.38% of the population.

There were 1,032 households, out of which 28.6% had children under the age of 18 living with them, 54.1% were married couples living together, 7.5% had a female householder with no husband present, and 35.6% were non-families. 31.2% of all households were made up of individuals, and 17.1% had someone living alone who was 65 years of age or older. The average household size was 2.34 and the average family size was 2.93.

24.5% are under the age of 18, 7.7% from 18 to 24, 24.1% from 25 to 44, 22.5% from 45 to 64, and 21.2% who were 65 years of age or older. The median age was 40 years. For every 100 females, there were 89.6 males. For every 100 females age 18 and over, there were 86.8 males.

The median income for a household in the city was $34,360, and the median income for a family was $44,938. Males had a median income of $30,466 versus $19,669 for females. The per capita income for the city was $17,459. About 4.2% of families and 6.6% of the population were below the poverty line, including 8.1% of those under age 18 and 6.2% of those age 65 or over.

== Economy ==
Other local factories include Dakota Treats, LLC a manufacturer of dog treats, For-Most, Inc. a manufacturer of cattle handling equipment, and Plasticology, LLC a plastic injection molding facility. Other large employers are Hawarden Regional Healthcare, Cooperative Farmers Elevator (CFE), Peoples Bank & Agency and Rivers Edge Bank. There are two K-12 schools in the city, West Sioux Elementary and West Sioux High/Middle School.

== Education ==
Ireton, Hawarden, Chatsworth, and surrounding rural areas formed the West Sioux Community School District in the fall of 1959.

== Arts and culture ==
=== Annual events ===
The city hosts "Big Sioux River Days" over Labor Day Weekend.

== Notable people ==
- J. Hyatt Downing, writer
- Hope Emerson, actress
- Adam Gregg, Lieutenant Governor of Iowa
- Stanley L. Greigg, member of the U.S. House of Representatives
- Brian Hansen, former American football punter in the National Football League
- Vince Jasper, former American football offensive lineman in the National Football League
- Lisa Suhair Majaj, Palestinian American poet and scholar
- Albert J. Meyer, economist
- Dick Sadler, politician
- Ruth Suckow, author
- Anna Johnson Pell Wheeler, mathematician
- Charles Zylstra, financial innovator

== See also ==
Hawarden was formerly the home of a junior college, Sioux Empire College, which closed in the 1980s.

Hawarden annexed the incorporated town of Calliope in 1893.
