= Sioux Empire College =

Coordinates: 43.00°N 96.48°W

- Active: 1965–1985
- Location: Hawarden, Iowa, United States

Sioux Empire College, also known as SEC0, was a community college located near the north side of the town of Hawarden in Sioux County, Iowa, United States. The school was founded in 1965 and its first semester was held in the fall of 1967. The college was closed in May 1985.
