= Adam Gregg =

American politician (born 1983)

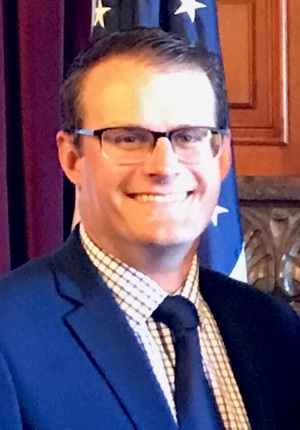
- Gregg in 2017

47th Lieutenant Governor of Iowa
- In office May 25, 2017 – September 3, 2024 (Note: Acting: May 25, 2017 – January 18, 2019)
- Governor: Kim Reynolds
- Preceded by: Kim Reynolds
- Succeeded by: Amy Sinclair (acting)

64th Chair of the National Lieutenant Governors Association
- In office 2023–2024
- Preceded by: Juliana Stratton
- Succeeded by: Garlin Gilchrist

Public Defender of Iowa
- In office December 8, 2014 – May 25, 2017
- Governor: Terry Branstad
- Preceded by: Kurt Swaim (acting)
- Succeeded by: Larry Johnson

Personal details
- Born: April 26, 1983 (age 43) Hawarden, Iowa, U.S.
- Party: Republican
- Spouse: Cari Gregg
- Children: 2
- Education: Central College, Iowa (BA); Drake University (JD)

Adam Gregg (born April 26, 1983) is an American politician who served as the 47th lieutenant governor of Iowa from 2019 to 2024 and as acting lieutenant governor from 2017 to 2019. A member of the Republican Party, Gregg served as Public Defender of Iowa from 2014 to 2017. He was the Republican candidate for Attorney General of Iowa in the November 2014 elections.

== Early life, education, and family ==
Gregg was born in Hawarden, Iowa. He graduated from West Sioux High School in 2002, where he was a multi-sport athlete in football, baseball, basketball, golf and track.

In 2006, Gregg graduated from Central College with a B.A. in political science and history. From 2006 to 2009, he attended Drake University Law School on a full scholarship and graduated with high honors. While there, he earned the faculty's William and Ellen Cooney Hoye Award and was a junior staff member of the Drake Law Review.

== Career ==
During his time at Central College, Gregg interned with the United States Department of Defense, United States Congress, and Parliament of the United Kingdom. While attending Drake University Law School, he conducted legal research for Iowa Supreme Court Chief Justice Mark Cady.

Gregg was the Republican nominee for Attorney General of Iowa in 2014. He lost to the long-time incumbent attorney general, Democrat Tom Miller.

Gregg was appointed by Governor Terry Branstad to serve as the Iowa State Public Defender on December 8, 2014.

=== Acting Lieutenant Governor of Iowa (2017–2019) ===
As the previous lieutenant governor of Iowa, Kim Reynolds ascended as governor when incumbent governor Terry Branstad resigned to become United States Ambassador to China. Due to ambiguities in Iowa's constitution and a controversial advisory opinion issued by Attorney General Tom Miller, there was some dispute regarding Reynolds' power to appoint a new lieutenant governor who would ascend as her successor if she left office prior to the expiration of Branstad's sixth non-consecutive term. To avoid the possibility of legal challenges, Reynolds appointed Gregg as acting lieutenant governor on May 25, 2017. Gregg was vested with all of the duties of lieutenant governor, but not the office itself, and so was not in the line of gubernatorial succession. Upon his appointment, it was reported that Gregg would be paid the salary set by Iowa law for the lieutenant governor position ($103,212).

=== Lieutenant Governor of Iowa (2019–2024) ===
Reynolds selected Gregg as her running mate for a full term in the 2018 election. Gregg was sworn in as the 47th lieutenant governor of Iowa on January 18, 2019.

Gregg resigned on September 3, 2024, effective immediately, to become president and chief executive officer of the Iowa Bankers Association.

== Personal life ==
Gregg married his West Sioux High School sweetheart, Cari. They have two children, Jackson and Lauren.

== Electoral history ==
2014 Iowa Attorney General election
Party	Candidate	Votes	%
Democratic	Tom Miller (incumbent)	616,711	56.1%
Republican	Adam Gregg	481,046	43.8%
Write-in		1,249	0.1%
Total votes		1,099,006	100.0%
Democratic hold			

2018 Iowa gubernatorial election
Party	Candidate	Votes	%	±%
Republican	Kim Reynolds (incumbent) / Adam Gregg	667,275	50.26%	−8.73%
Democratic	Fred Hubbell / Rita Hart	630,986	47.53%	+10.26%
Libertarian	Jake Porter / Lynne Gentry	21,426	1.61%	−0.19%
Independent	Gary Siegwarth / Natalia Blaskovich	7,463	0.56%	N/A
n/a	Write-ins	488	0.04%	−0.05%
Total votes		1,327,638	100.0%	N/A
Republican hold				

2022 Iowa gubernatorial election
Party	Candidate	Votes	%	±%
Republican	Kim Reynolds (incumbent); Adam Gregg (incumbent)	709,198	58.04%	+7.78%
Democratic	Deidre DeJear; Eric Van Lacker	482,950	39.53%	−8.00%
Libertarian	Rick Stewart; Marco Battaglia	28,998	2.37%	+0.84%
Write-in		718	0.06%	+0.02%
Total votes		1,220,864	100.00	
Turnout		1,230,416	55.06%	
Registered electors		2,234,666		
Republican hold				

== See also ==
- List of lieutenant governors of Iowa

== Notes ==
Party political offices
Preceded by Brenna Bird	Republican nominee for Attorney General of Iowa; 2014	Vacant Title next held by Brenna Bird; 2022
Preceded by Kim Reynolds	Republican nominee for Lieutenant Governor of Iowa; 2018, 2022	Succeeded by Derek Wulf
Political offices
Preceded by Kim Reynolds	Lieutenant Governor of Iowa; 2017–2024; Acting: 2017–2019	Succeeded by Amy Sinclair; Acting
