= Brian Hansen (American football) =

American football player (born 1960)

No. 10, 11, 12
- Position: Punter

Personal information
- Born: October 20, 1960 (age 66); Hawarden, Iowa, U.S.
- Listed height: 6 ft 4 in (1.93 m)
- Listed weight: 215 lb (98 kg)

Career information
- High school: West Sioux (Hawarden)
- College: Sioux Falls
- NFL draft: 1984: 9th round, 237th overall pick

Career history
- New Orleans Saints (1984–1988); New England Patriots (1990); Cleveland Browns (1991–1993); New York Jets (1994–1998); Washington Redskins (1999)

Awards and highlights
- Pro Bowl (1984); 2× NFL punting yards leader (1990, 1995)

Career NFL statistics
- Punts: 1,057
- Punting yards: 44,700
- Punting average: 42.3
- Longest punt: 73
- Inside 20: 247
- Stats at Pro Football Reference

Brian Dean Hansen (born October 20, 1960) is an American former professional football player who was a punter in the National Football League (NFL). He was named to the Pro Bowl in 1984 while playing for the New Orleans Saints.

== Biography ==
Hansen was born in Hawarden, Iowa, and graduated from West Sioux High School. Hansen played college football at the University of Sioux Falls and was selected in the ninth round of the 1984 NFL draft with the 237th overall pick. While attending the University of Sioux Falls, Hansen earned First-team All-American honors.

Hansen played from 1984 to 1999 for the New Orleans Saints, the New England Patriots, the Cleveland Browns, the New York Jets, and the Washington Redskins. He was selected to the 1984 Pro Bowl.

Hansen is currently the South Dakota state director for Fellowship of Christian Athletes (FCA) in Sioux Falls, South Dakota. Hansen and his wife, Lauri, have three children.

== NFL career statistics ==
Legend
	Led the league
**Bold**	Career high

=== Regular season ===
Year	Team	Punting									
Year	Team	GP	Punts	Yds	Net Yds	Lng	Avg	Net Avg	Blk	Ins20	TB
1984	NOR	**16**	69	3,020	2,330	66	43.8	33.3	1	9	7
1985	NOR	**16**	89	3,763	**3,246**	58	42.3	36.5	0	14	6
1986	NOR	**16**	81	3,456	3,002	66	42.7	**36.6**	1	17	11
1987	NOR	12	52	2,104	1,849	60	40.5	35.6	0	19	6
1988	NOR	**16**	72	2,913	2,505	64	40.5	34.3	1	19	8
1990	NWE	**16**	90	3,752	3,089	69	41.7	33.6	**2**	17	8
1991	CLE	**16**	80	3,397	2,889	65	42.5	36.1	0	20	6
1992	CLE	**16**	74	3,083	2,709	**73**	41.7	36.1	1	**28**	7
1993	CLE	**16**	82	3,632	2,994	72	44.3	35.6	**2**	15	10
1994	NYJ	**16**	84	3,534	3,034	64	42.1	36.1	0	25	**12**
1995	NYJ	**16**	**99**	**4,090**	3,187	67	41.3	31.9	1	23	10
1996	NYJ	**16**	74	3,293	2,704	69	**44.5**	36.5	0	13	8
1997	NYJ	15	71	3,068	2,539	58	43.2	35.3	1	21	5
1998	NYJ	7	31	1,233	1,015	62	39.8	32.7	0	6	2
1999	NYJ	2	9	362	222	49	40.2	24.7	0	1	1
Career		212	1,057	44,700	37,314	73	42.3	35.0	10	247	107

=== Playoffs ===
Year	Team	Punting									
Year	Team	GP	Punts	Yds	Net Yds	Lng	Avg	Net Avg	Blk	Ins20	TB
1987	NOR	1	6	265	265	53	44.2	44.2	0	0	0
Career		1	6	265	265	53	44.2	44.2	0	0	0
