= Hebrew abbreviations =

Overview of abbreviations in Hebrew language

Abbreviations (Hebrew: ראשי תיבות, romanized: Rashei Tevot) are a common part of the Hebrew language, with many organizations, places, people and concepts known by their abbreviations.

== Typography ==
Acronyms in Hebrew use a special punctuation mark called gershayim (״). This mark is placed between the last two letters of the non-inflected form of the acronym (e.g. "report" in singular is דו״ח, hence the plural דו״חות). Acronyms can be formed from strings of single initial letters, e.g. פזצט״א pazátsta (for פול, זחל, צפה, טווח, אש), or multiple initial letters, e.g. ארה״ק (for ארץ הקודש, the Holy Land) or ראשל״צ ráshlats (for ראשון לציון, Rishon LeZion).

If the acronym is read as is, then the spelling should be with a final form letter. If, on the other hand, the acronym is read as the complete phrase or read as the individual letters, then it should be spelled with a medial form letter. In practice, this rule is often ignored, and the acronyms spelled either way.

Abbreviations that are truncations of a single word, consisting of the first letter or first several letters of that word (as opposed to acronyms formed from initials or truncations of more than one word) are denoted using the punctuation mark geresh (׳) by placing the sign after the last letter of the abbreviation (e.g. "Ms.": גב׳). However, in practice, single and double quotes are often used instead of the special punctuation marks (for which most keyboards do not have keys), with the single quote used both in acronyms and abbreviations.

In Modern Hebrew, periods are sometimes used to mark an abbreviation (e.g., ת.ז. for תעודת זהות, "ID card", or ת.ד. for תא דואר, "P.O.B.") this notation is mainly used in technical writing and regarded nonstandard by the Hebrew Academy.

== Pronunciation ==
Often (and especially when they describe a noun), Hebrew acronyms are pronounced by the insertion of a vowel sound (usually [a]) between the letters. These vowels often appear in transliterations to other scripts. Examples include Shas (ש״ס), Tanakh (תנ״ך) and Shabak (שב״כ). There are exceptions to the use of "a", such as Etzel (אצ״ל).

When one of the letters is vav or yud, these may be read as vowels ("u"/"o" and "i") instead: דו״ח (duakh/dokh = דין וחשבון, judgement and account); אדמו״ר (admor = אדוננו מורנו ורבנו, Hasidic rebbe); שו״ת (shut = שאלות ותשובות, questions and answers); סכו״ם (sakum = סכין כף ומזלג, knife spoon and fork); תפו״ז (tapuz = תפוח זהב, orange, lit. golden apple); או״ם (um = האומות המאוחדות, the United Nations); ביל״ו Bilu; לח״י Lehi. (An exception is בית״ר, Beitar, pronounced beytar.)

Hebrew numbers (e.g. year numbers in the Hebrew calendar) are written the same way as acronyms, with gershayim before the last character, but pronounced as separate letter names. For example, ה׳תשע״ה (5775 AM, or 2014–2015 CE) is pronounced hei-tav-shin-ayin-hei.

== Usage ==
=== People ===
Acronyms have been widely used in Hebrew since at least the Middle Ages. Several important rabbis are referred to with acronyms of their names. For example, Rabbi Shlomo ben Yitzchak is known as Rashi (רש״י), Rabbi Moshe ben Maimon (Maimonides) is commonly known as Rambam (רמב״ם), [Note: Rambam is pronounced with the emphasis on the first syllable, Ram]; Rabbi Moshe ben Nahman (Nahmanides) is likewise known as the Ramban (רמב״ן), [Note: Ramban is pronounced with the emphasis on the second syllable, ban]; (Note: Note that these two abbreviations -- Rambam and Ramban -- are so similar, that it might be [more] difficult for the listener to distinguish between them, based on just the final consonant (m or n). Hence, these "guidelines" were established as to which syllable to emphasize, when pronouncing one of these two "similar" acronyms. That makes it easier for the listener to distinguish between them, when hearing one of them.) and Baal Shem Tov is called the Besht (בעש״ט).

A number of such acronyms differ only in their last letter. They all begin with Mahara-, as an acronym of the words מורנו הרב רבי ... (Morenu Ha-Rav rabi ..., "Our teacher the Rabbi ...").

- "Maharam", with the final "m" standing for a number of names, such as Moshe and Meïr.
- "Maharal" for Judah Loew ben Bezalel
- "Maharash" for either Meir Shauls or Shmuel Schneersohn.

=== Text ===
The usage of Hebrew acronyms extends to liturgical groupings: the word Tanakh (תנ״ך) is an acronym for Torah (Five Books of Moses), Nevi'im (Book of Prophets), and Ketuvim (Hagiographa).

Most often, though, one will find use of acronyms as acrostics, in both prayer, poetry (see Piyyut), and kabbalistic works. Because each Hebrew letter also has a numeric value, embedding an acrostic may give an additional layer of meaning to these works.

One purpose of acrostics was as a mnemonic or a way for an author to weave his name as a signature, or some other spiritual thought, into his work, at a time when much was memorized. Examples of prayers which contain acrostics include:

- Ashrei – The first letter of every verse starts with a consecutive letter of the Hebrew alphabet, with the omission of nun.
- Lekhah Dodi – The first letter of each stanza (not including the first and last) spells out "Shlomo Halevi" (שלמה הלוי) the name of the author Shlomo Halevi Alkabetz.
- Shokhen Ad – Four lines are written so that letters line up vertically, with the first letter of the second word in each line spelling the name Yitzchak, which may refer either to the Patriarch Yitzchak or to an unknown author, and the first letter of the last word in each line spelling out the name Rivka, one of the Matriarchs.

== See also ==
- Notarikon
- Acronym and initialism
- Bible code
