= 2014 Iowa Attorney General election =

- November 4, 2014
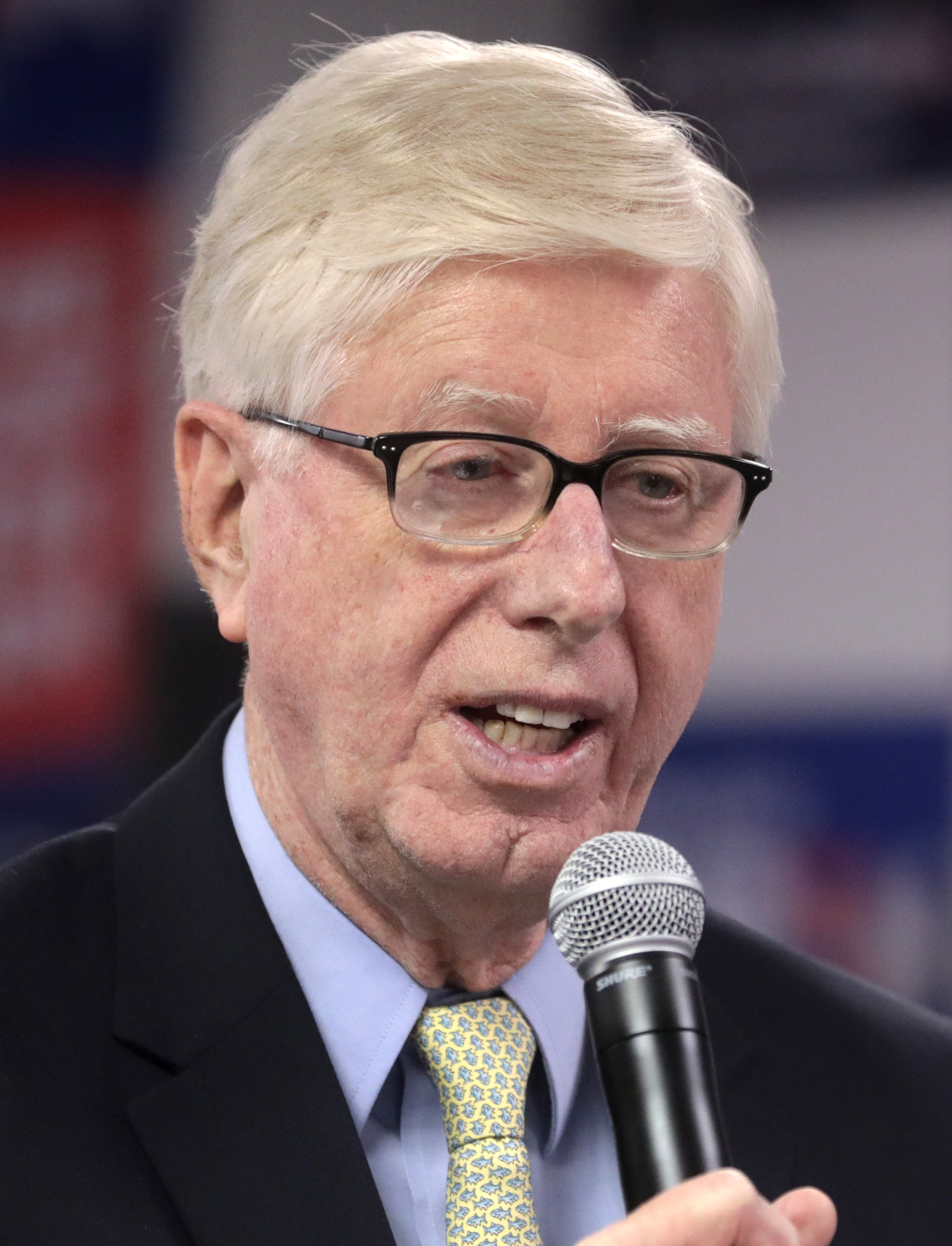

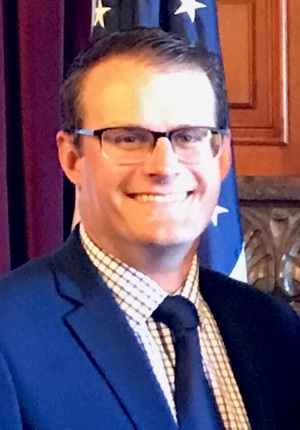
Candidate	Tom Miller	Adam Gregg
Party	Democratic	Republican
Popular vote	616,711	481,046
Percentage	56.12%	43.77%
- Miller: 50–60% 60–70% 70–80% Gregg: 50–60% 60–70% 70–80% 80–90%
Attorney General before election
Tom Miller
Democratic
Elected Attorney General
Tom Miller
Democratic

An election was held on November 4, 2014, to elect the Attorney General of Iowa. The election was held concurrently with that year's gubernatorial election. Democratic nominee and incumbent Attorney General Tom Miller won re-election to a sixth consecutive and ninth overall term in office against Republican candidate Adam Gregg.

== Democratic primary ==
=== Candidates ===
==== Nominee ====
- Tom Miller, incumbent Attorney General

Democratic primary results
Party	Candidate	Votes	%
Democratic	Tom Miller (incumbent)	61,456	99.63
Democratic	Write-ins	230	0.37
Total votes		61,686	100.0

== Republican primary ==
=== Candidates ===
==== Nominee ====
- Adam Gregg, Attorney and lobbyist

Republican primary results
Party	Candidate	Votes	%
Republican	Adam Gregg	0	0.00
	Write-ins	3,708	100.0
Total votes		3,708	100.0

== General election ==
=== Polling ===
Poll source	Date(s) administered	Sample size	Margin of error	Tom Miller (D)	Adam Gregg (R)	Other	Undecided
Public Policy Polling	November 1–3, 2014	1,265	± 2.8%	55%	36%	—	10%
Iowa Poll	October 28–31, 2014	701	± 3.7%	50%	39%	2%	9%
Suffolk University	October 11–14, 2014	500	± 4.4%	55%	31%	—	14%
Public Policy Polling	September 25–28, 2014	1,192	± 2.8%	53%	33%	—	14%
Suffolk	August 23–26, 2014	500	± 4%	48%	28%	—	24%
Public Policy Polling	August 22–24, 2014	915	± 3.2%	55%	31%	—	14%

=== Results ===
Tom Miller won re-election with 56.12% of the vote.

2014 Iowa Attorney General election
Party	Candidate	Votes	%
Democratic	Tom Miller (incumbent)	616,711	56.12
Republican	Adam Gregg	481,046	43.77
Write-in		1,249	0.11
Total votes		1,099,006	100%
Democratic hold			

==== By congressional district ====
Miller won three of four congressional districts, including two that elected Republicans.

District	Miller	Gregg	Representative
1st	60%	40%	Bruce Braley (113th Congress)
1st	60%	40%	Rod Blum (114th Congress)
2nd	58%	42%	Dave Loebsack
3rd	57%	43%	Tom Latham (113th Congress)
3rd	57%	43%	David Young (114th Congress)
4th	49%	51%	Steve King
