= J. Hyatt Downing =

American writer

- Born: March 18, 1888; Granville, Iowa, U.S.
- Died: 1973 (aged 84–85); Pismo Beach, California, U.S.
- Education: University of South Dakota
- Occupations: Novelist, short story writer
- Spouse: Mary McGinnis
- Children: 1

J. Hyatt Downing (1888–1973) was an American novelist and short story writer. His short stories were published in Scribner's Magazine and Reader's Digest. His novel about Sioux City, Iowa, Sioux City, was a bestseller.

== Early life ==
John Hyatt Downing was born on March 18, 1888, in Granville, Iowa. He grew up in Hawarden, Iowa and Blunt, South Dakota. He worked on his father's ranch and as a railroad surveyor for the Northwestern Railroad, hotel's night clerk and shepherd in Wyoming, Nebraska and the Black Hills. He then graduated from the University of South Dakota in 1913.

== Career ==
Downing worked for the Internal Revenue Service in Aberdeen, South Dakota. He managed an alfalfa farm in Carlsbad, New Mexico, in 1921–1925. Downing worked as an insurance agent in Saint Paul, Minnesota, in 1925–1930. At the same time, he began writing short stories for Scribner's Magazine.

His first novel, A Prayer for Tomorrow, was a semi-autobiographical account of the ranching culture in South Dakota. He moved to Sioux City, Iowa, and wrote four more novels, including Sioux City, which became a bestseller and book of the month. Downing sold the rights to a film production company and moved to California, but the movie was never made. Instead, he wrote publicity and radio scripts for Twentieth Century Fox instead. His last short story was published in Reader's Digest in 1963. His novel Four on the Trail was a paperback Western only released in England.

== Personal life and death ==
Downing married Mary McGinnis. They had son, John, in 1921. Downing contracted tuberculosis in 1925. Downing and his family first resided in Sioux City, Iowa, and later in Pismo Beach, California.

Downing died in 1973 in Pismo Beach, California, at 85.

== Works ==
=== Novels ===
- A Prayer for Tomorrow (1938)
- Hope of Living (1939)
- Sioux City (1940)
- Anthony Trant (1941)
- The Harvest is Late (1944)
- Garth (unpublished novel)

=== Short stories ===
- And Then It Was Spring
- Buffalo Grass
- The Butte
- Chicken Business
- Closed Roads (Scribner's Magazine, August 1925)
- The Distance to Casper (Scribner's Magazine, February, 1927)
- Dream Street
- The First Illusion (Scribner's Magazine, May 1930)
- Furlough (Farm Journal, July 1943)
- Girl of Many Faces
- The Great MacLeod (Collier's, 1948)
- The Harvesters
- Head of the Family
- Headwork (Liberty, November 6, 1946)
- The House on Bad Woman Creek
- How Does Your Garden Grow
- If Darryl Zanuck...
- Just for the Night (Good Housekeeping, October 1940)
- The Longer Shot
- A Man Needs a Horse (Collier's, February 23, 1946)
- The Man Who Killed Jeb Stuart
- The Marshal's Friend (True, April 1947)
- Old Cimmarron - On the Santa Fe Trail (Westways, August 1951)
- One of the Boys
- Out of the Dark (Liberty, May 10 and 24, 1947)
- The Return of Willie Scroggs (Country Gentleman, July 1947)
- Rewards (Scribner's Magazine, April 1926)
- The Sage of Virgin Creek
- Sir, the King!
- Star Without Glamor (Collier's, October 20, 1945)
- Sun-Kissed Bangtails (Collier's, March 2, 1946)
- This Is Where He Walked
- Treasury of the Past (Holiday, November 1946)
- We Went West (Scribner's Magazine, May 1928)
- Woman In A Hurry
