= Dorothy Maharam =

American mathematician

Dorothy Maharam Stone
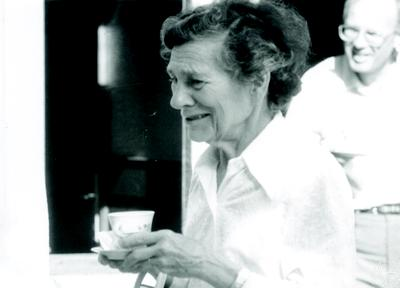
- Dorothy Maharam Stone in 1991
- Born: Dorothy Maharam; July 1, 1917; Parkersburg, West Virginia, US
- Died: September 27, 2014 (aged 97); Brookline, Massachusetts, US
- Resting place: Kehillath Jacob Cemetery, West Roxbury
- Education: Carnegie Institute of Technology Bryn Mawr College
- Known for: Maharam's theorem Maharam algebra
- Spouse: Arthur Stone
- Children: 2
- Scientific career
- Workplaces: University of Rochester
- Thesis: On Measure in Abstract Sets (1940)
- Doctoral advisor: Anna Johnson Pell Wheeler

Dorothy Maharam Stone (July 1, 1917 – September 27, 2014) was an American mathematician born in Parkersburg, West Virginia, who made important contributions to measure theory and became the namesake of Maharam's theorem and Maharam algebra.

== Life ==
Maharam earned her B.S. degree at Carnegie Institute of Technology in 1937 and her Ph.D. in 1940 under Anna Johnson Pell Wheeler from Bryn Mawr College with a dissertation entitled On measure in abstract sets. Part of her thesis was published in the Transactions of the American Mathematical Society. Then she went on to a postdoc at the Institute for Advanced Study in Princeton, New Jersey, where she first met fellow mathematician Arthur Harold Stone. They married in April 1942.

Stone and Maharam both lectured at various universities in the US and the United Kingdom, including Northeastern University and University of Manchester, and were faculty at the University of Rochester for many years. She was an invited speaker at a measure theory conference at Northern Illinois University in 1980. Their two children, David and Ellen, both became mathematicians as well.

She retired in 2001. Her husband, Arthur Stone, died August 6, 2000, and her son, David Stone, died August 27, 2014. She died a month later in Brookline, Massachusetts and was buried at Kehillath Jacob Cemetery in West Roxbury.

== Contributions ==
Maharam pioneered the research of finitely additive measures on integers. Maharam's theorem about the decomposability of complete measure spaces plays an important role in the theory of Banach spaces. Maharam published it in the Proceedings of the National Academy of Sciences of the United States of America in 1942. Another paper of Maharam, in 1947 in the Annals of Mathematics, introduced Maharam algebras, which are complete Boolean algebras with continuous submeasures.

== Recognition ==
Maharam was named a Fellow of the American Association for the Advancement of Science in 1976.
