= Tom Miller (politician) =

Former Attorney General of Iowa (born 1944)

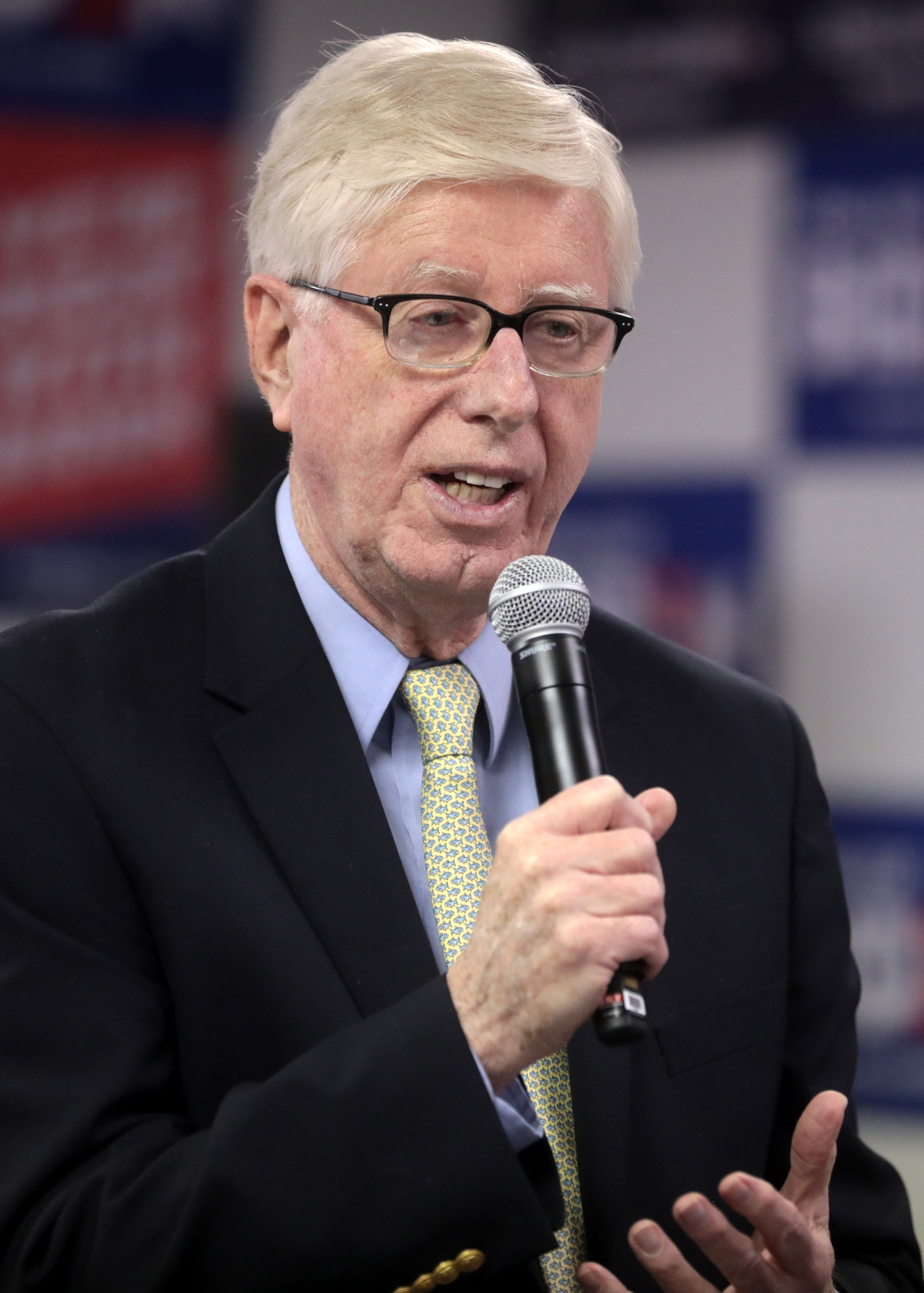
- Miller in 2020

30th and 32nd Attorney General of Iowa
- In office January 6, 1995 – January 3, 2023
- Governor: Terry Branstad; Tom Vilsack; Chet Culver; Terry Branstad; Kim Reynolds
- Preceded by: Bonnie Campbell
- Succeeded by: Brenna Bird
- In office January 12, 1979 – January 11, 1991
- Governor: Robert Ray; Terry Branstad
- Preceded by: Richard C. Turner
- Succeeded by: Bonnie Campbell

Personal details
- Born: Thomas John Miller; August 11, 1944 (age 82) Dubuque, Iowa, U.S.
- Party: Democratic
- Spouse(s): Linda Cottington (m. 1981; div. 2001) Holli Henderson (m. 2004; div. 2016)
- Children: 1
- Education: Loras College (BA); Harvard University (JD)

Thomas John Miller (born August 11, 1944) is an American lawyer and politician who served as the Attorney General of Iowa from 1979 to 1991 and from 1995 to 2023. After West Virginia Attorney General Darrell McGraw lost his reelection bid in 2012, Miller became the longest serving state attorney general in the United States.

A member of the Democratic Party, he served as the state's 30th and 32nd Attorney General. Miller's combined tenure of 40 years in office makes him the longest serving State Attorney General in United States history, having surpassed Frank J. Kelley's 37-year term of office as Michigan Attorney General; Kelley still holds the record for longest continuous tenure as an attorney general, having served from 1961 to 1999. Miller was defeated in his 2022 reelection bid by Republican Brenna Bird.

== Early life and education ==
Miller was raised in Dubuque, Iowa to parents Elmer and Betty Miller. His father was a longtime county assessor. He graduated from Wahlert Catholic High School in Dubuque, earned his undergraduate degree at Loras College in Dubuque, and completed his J.D. degree at Harvard Law School in 1969.

== Early career ==
Miller served as an AmeriCorps VISTA volunteer in Baltimore for one year and as a legislative assistant to U.S. Representative John Culver of Iowa. He worked for the Baltimore Legal Aid Bureau, and taught at the University of Maryland School of Law.

In 1973, Miller returned to northeast Iowa and opened a law practice in McGregor, Iowa. He served as the city attorney for McGregor and Marquette, Iowa for five years. In 1974, he won the Democratic nomination for Attorney General of Iowa, but lost the general election to Republican incumbent Richard C. Turner.

== Attorney General ==
Miller was first elected Attorney General of Iowa in 1978, defeating Richard Turner in a rematch. He was re-elected in 1982 and 1986. In 1990 Miller ran for governor and lost to Donald Avenson in the Democratic primary. After that loss, Miller worked in private practice with the Des Moines office of the Faegre & Benson law firm. He was again elected Attorney General in 1994, and was re-elected in 1998, 2002, 2006, 2010, 2014, and 2018. Miller narrowly lost the 2022 election to Brenna Bird (a rematch of 2010). He was the longest-serving state attorney general in U.S. history.

== Personal life ==
In 1981, Miller married Linda Cottington in 1981. They have one son, Matthew, who was born in 1982. They were divorced in 2001.

Miller married Hollie Henderson, 12 years his junior, on November 20, 2004 and divorced in late 2015. He paid his wife $400,000 as a property settlement and an additional $4,166.66 per month until 2021.

== Electoral history ==
1974 Iowa Attorney General election
Party	Candidate	Votes	%
Republican	Richard C. Turner (incumbent)	458,196	52.22%
Democratic	Tom Miller	419,270	47.78%
Total votes		877,466	100.0%
Republican hold			

1978 Iowa Attorney General election
Party	Candidate	Votes	%
Democratic	Tom Miller	442,895	55.59%
Republican	Richard C. Turner (incumbent)	351,251	44.09%
Socialist	Steve Wilson	2,519	0.32%
Total votes		796,665	100.0%
Democratic gain from Republican			

1982 Iowa Attorney General election
Party	Candidate	Votes	%
Democratic	Tom Miller (incumbent)	577,277	59.45%
Republican	Walter Conlon	388,284	39.98%
Libertarian	Dean Heyne	2,811	0.29%
Socialist	Brent Lee Vanderlinden	2,692	0.28%
Total votes		971,064	100.0%
Democratic hold			

1986 Iowa Attorney General election
Party	Candidate	Votes	%
Democratic	Tom Miller (incumbent)	545,653	64.44%
Republican	James Davis	295,203	34.86%
Independent	Eddie Collins	5,922	0.70%
Total votes		846,778	100.0%
Democratic hold			

1990 Iowa gubernatorial Democratic primary
Party	Candidate	Votes	%
Democratic	Donald Avenson	79,022	39.45
Democratic	Tom Miller	63,364	31.63
Democratic	John Crystal	52,170	26.05
Democratic	Jo Ann Zimmerman	4,475	2.23
Democratic	Darold Powers	1,167	0.58
Democratic	Write-ins	107	0.05
Total votes		200,305	100.00

1994 Iowa Attorney General election
Party	Candidate	Votes	%
Democratic	Tom Miller	509,045	53.33%
Republican	Joe Gunderson	431,997	45.26%
Natural Law	Jay Marcus	13,477	1.41%
Total votes		954,519	100.0%
Democratic hold			

1998 Iowa Attorney General election
Party	Candidate	Votes	%
Democratic	Tom Miller (incumbent)	603,523	65.45%
Republican	Mark Schwickerath	298,528	32.37%
Natural Law	Nancy Watkins	20,104	2.18%
Total votes		922,155	100.0%
Democratic hold			

2002 Iowa Attorney General election
Party	Candidate	Votes	%
Democratic	Tom Miller (incumbent)	612,167	61.61%
Republican	David Millage	364,480	36.68%
Libertarian	Edward Noyes	16,607	1.67%
Write-in		409	0.04%
Total votes		993,663	100.0%
Democratic hold			

2006 Iowa Attorney General election
Party	Candidate	Votes	%
Democratic	Tom Miller (incumbent)	748,181	100.00%
Total votes		748,181	100.0%
Democratic hold			

2010 Iowa Attorney General election
Party	Candidate	Votes	%
Democratic	Tom Miller (incumbent)	607,779	55.5%
Republican	Brenna Findley	486,057	44.4%
Write-in		797	0.07%
Total votes		1,094,633	100.0%
Democratic hold			

2014 Iowa Attorney General election
Party	Candidate	Votes	%
Democratic	Tom Miller (incumbent)	616,711	56.1%
Republican	Adam Gregg	481,046	43.8%
Write-in		1,249	0.1%
Total votes		1,099,006	100.0%
Democratic hold			

2018 Iowa Attorney General election
Party	Candidate	Votes	%
Democratic	Tom Miller (incumbent)	880,531	76.51%
Libertarian	Marco Battaglia	262,131	22.78%
Write-in		8,237	0.72%
Total votes		1,150,899	100.0%
Democratic hold			

2022 Iowa Attorney General election
Party	Candidate	Votes	%
Republican	Brenna Bird	611,081	50.83%
Democratic	Tom Miller (incumbent)	590,258	49.10%
Write-in		800	0.07%
Total votes		1,202,139	100.0%
Republican gain from Democratic			

Party political offices
Preceded by James Reynolds	Democratic nominee for Attorney General of Iowa; 1974, 1978, 1982, 1986	Succeeded by Bonnie Campbell
Preceded by Bonnie Campbell	Democratic nominee for Attorney General of Iowa; 1994, 1998, 2002, 2006, 2010, 2014, 2018, 2022	Succeeded by Nathan Willems
Legal offices
Preceded by Richard C. Turner	Attorney General of Iowa; 1979–1991	Succeeded by Bonnie Campbell
Preceded by Bonnie Campbell	Attorney General of Iowa; 1995–2023	Succeeded by Brenna Bird
