= Anna Johnson Pell Wheeler =

American mathematician

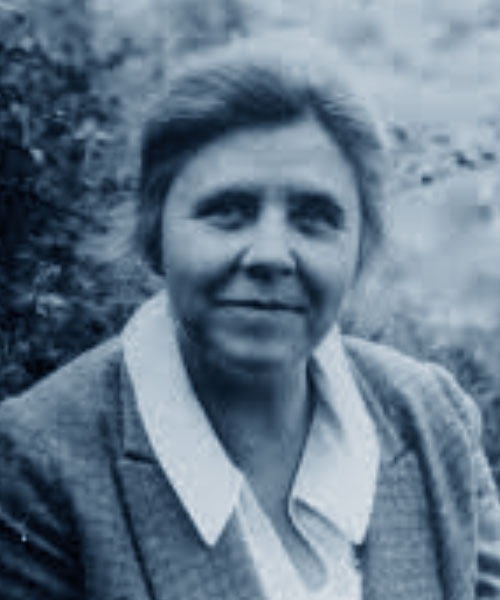
- Born: Anna Johnson; May 5, 1883; Calliope, Iowa, U.S.
- Died: March 26, 1966 (aged 82); Bryn Mawr, Pennsylvania, U.S.
- Spouses: Alexander Pell (m. 1907; died 1921) Arthur Wheeler (m. 1925; died 1932)
- Scientific career
- Education: University of Göttingen (PhD, 1910); Radcliffe College (MA, 1905); University of Iowa (MA, 1904); University of South Dakota (BA, 1903)
- Known for: Early work on linear algebra in infinite dimensions
- Fields: Mathematics
- Workplaces: Bryn Mawr College; Mount Holyoke College
- Theses: Biorthogonal Systems of Functions with Applications to the Theory of Integral Equations (1909); The extension of Galois theory to linear differential equations (1904)
- Doctoral advisors: David Hilbert; Felix Klein; Hermann Minkowski; Karl Schwarzchild; E. H. Moore
- Doctoral students: Dorothy Maharam; Marion Cameron Gray
- Other notable students: Annita Tuller

Anna Johnson Pell Wheeler (née Johnson; May 5, 1883 – March 26, 1966) was an American mathematician. She is best known for early work on linear algebra in infinite dimensions, which has later become a part of functional analysis.

== Biography ==
Anna Johnson was born on May 5, 1883, to Swedish immigrant parents in Calliope, Iowa in the United States. Her father, Andrew Gustav Johnson, was a furniture dealer and undertaker. Her mother, Amelia (née Friberg), was a homemaker. Both of Johnson's parents came from the parish of Lyrestad, in Västergötland, Sweden. Johnson had two older siblings, Esther and Elmer. At the age of nine her family moved to Akron, Iowa and she was enrolled in a private school. In 1899 she joined her sister at the University of South Dakota where they took many of the same classes. She graduated in 1903 and began graduate work at the University of Iowa. Her thesis, titled The extension of Galois theory to linear differential equations, earned her a master's degree in 1904. She obtained a second graduate degree one year later from Radcliffe College, where she took courses from Maxime Bôcher and William Fogg Osgood.

In 1905 she won an Alice Freeman Palmer Fellowship from Wellesley College to spend a year at the University of Göttingen, where she studied under David Hilbert, Felix Klein, Hermann Minkowski, and Karl Schwarzschild. As she worked toward a doctorate, her relationship with Alexander Pell, a former professor from the University of South Dakota, intensified. He traveled to Göttingen and they were married in July 1907. This trip posed a significant threat to Pell's life, since he was a former Russian double agent whose real name was Sergey Degayev.

After the wedding, the Pells returned to Vermillion, South Dakota, where she taught classes in the theory of functions and differential equations. By 1908 she was back in Göttingen, working on her dissertation; an argument with Hilbert, however, made its completion impossible. She moved with her husband to Chicago, where she worked with E. H. Moore to finish her dissertation, Biorthogonal Systems of Functions with Applications to the Theory of Integral Equations, and received a Ph.D. in 1909.

She began looking for a teaching position, but found hostility in every mathematics department. She wrote to a friend: "I had hoped for a position in one of the good univ. like Wisc., Ill. etc., but there is such an objection to women that they prefer a man even if he is inferior both in training and research". In 1911 her husband had a stroke and she taught his classes at the Armout Institute for the remainder of the semester. She then accepted a position at Mount Holyoke College and taught there for seven years.

In 1917, her last year at Mount Holyoke College, she published (together with R. L. Gordon) a paper regarding Sturm's theorem. In that they solved a problem that had eluded James Joseph Sylvester (1853) and Edward Burr Van Vleck (1899). That paper (along with their theorem) was forgotten for almost 100 years until it was recently rediscovered.

In 1918 she became an associate professor at Bryn Mawr College in Pennsylvania. Three years later she became the head of the Bryn Mawr mathematics department, and became a full professor in 1925. In the same year she married Arthur Leslie Wheeler (1871-1932), a classical scholar and head of the department of classics at Bryn Mawr College, who was appointed chairman of the department of classics of Princeton University in 1926. She moved with him, commuting to Bryn Mawr, teaching part-time, and becoming active in Princeton's mathematics society. In 1927 she became the first woman to present a lecture at the American Mathematical Society Colloquium. After Wheeler died in 1932, she returned to Bryn Mawr and taught full-time.

Wheeler was instrumental in bringing German mathematician Emmy Noether to Bryn Mawr in 1933, after the latter's expulsion from the University of Göttingen by the Nazi government. The two women worked together happily for two years, until Noether died suddenly after an operation in 1935. Wheeler continued teaching at Bryn Mawr until she retired in 1948. She died in 1966 following a stroke. Her doctoral students included Dorothy Maharam and Marion Cameron Gray.

== Scholarship ==
Anna Johnson Pell Wheeler conducted investigations in a branch of functional analysis that she referred to as "linear algebra of infinitely many variables"
