= Ro Foege =

American politician (born 1938)

Romaine H. Foege
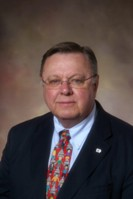

Member of the Iowa House of Representatives from the 29th district
- In office 1996–2008
- Preceded by: Lynn Schulte
- Succeeded by: Nathan Willems

Personal details
- Born: September 1, 1938 (age 88) George, Iowa, U.S.
- Party: Democratic
- Spouse: Susan Salter
- Children: 6
- Education: Wartburg College; University of Iowa
- Occupation: Social Worker
- Website: Foege's website when he was in the Iowa House

Romaine Henry "Ro" Foege (born September 1, 1938) is an American politician who served in the Iowa House of Representatives from 1996 to 2008, representing Iowa's 29th House of Representatives district as a member of the Democratic Party, which included representation for portions for the counties of Linn and Johnson. He additionally served as director of the Iowa Department on Aging from 2010 to 2011.

He was born in George, Iowa. He is the fourth of seven children born to Henry Foege, a Lutheran minister, and Frieda (Kruse) Foege. He was the first of his siblings to be born in the United States as his parents had recently returned from doing mission work for the American Lutheran Church in Papua New Guinea. His family moved from George to Decorah, Iowa, and then to Montgomery, Alabama, before moving to Dows, Iowa, in 1942 where his father was the Pastor of Vernon Lutheran Church. The family moved to Pocahontas, Iowa in 1946 and he graduated from Pocahontas High School in 1956.

At the age of 4, Foege went to live with the John H. and Ellie Janssen family of Gilmore City, Iowa, due to the illness of his mother. This six-month stay developed into a lifelong relationship with the Janssen family as he returned to live with the Janssen family every summer until his 17th birthday.

He received his BA in Social Work from Wartburg College in 1960 and his MSW from the University of Iowa in 1963. He also studied Individual Psychology at Bowie State University in Maryland and received a Certificate in Psychotherapy from the Alfred Adler Institute of Minnesota.

Foege was involved in a wide variety of professional and voluntary human services and community activities. While on the staff of Linn County Department of Human Services, he developed a foster family program and later, while working as the administrator of Catholic Charities in Cedar Rapids, Iowa, he served as a consultant to the Linn County Juvenile Court. He was a founding board member of Cedar Rapids-based family and children service agencies, Four Oaks and Horizon's. He also served on the Marion Independent School Board and assisted in the development of Foundation II.

Foege was a school social worker with Grant Wood Area Education Agency from 1978 until his tenure as an Iowa legislator. He was named Iowa School Social Worker of the Year, 1992-'93.

Foege sat on numerous committees in the Iowa House. Foege served as an assistant minority leader for two years and as the ranking Democrat on the Justice Systems Appropriations Sub-committee. Foege served on the House Committees on Education; Human Resources; Administration and Rules; and Appropriations. He served as chair of the House Health and Human Services Appropriations Sub-committee, 2006–2008 and served as the co-chair of the Commission on Affordable Healthcare for Small Businesses and Families in 2007-2008. Foege retired from the Iowa House and did not run for re-election in 2008.

Iowa Governor Chet Culver appointed Foege to chair the Mental Health Institute Task Force in 2009. In June 2010, Foege was appointed Director of the Iowa Department on Aging by Governor Culver serving in that position until January 2011.

Foege was a member of the Iowa Tobacco Use and Prevention Commission, The Iowa Mental Health Planning Council; The Iowa Community Empowerment Board; and the Iowa Consortium for Comprehenvive Cancer Control. He also served on the Linn County (IA) Community Empowerment Board, Iowa Healthcare Collaborative and the National Annie E. Casey Family and Children's Services Advisory Board. Foege has received many awards and much recognition for his contributions to the field of health and human services.

Foege continues his community involvement as a member of the St. Luke's Hospice Board; Iowa Policy Project Board; Parish Nurse Advisory Council; Wartburg College Advisory Board; Iowa Medical Home Advisory Council; Matthew 25 Advisory Board; and the Foster Aunts and Uncles program, a support organization for youngsters who have aged out of the foster care system.

Foege holds appointments as an adjunct instructor at the University of Iowa School of Social Work and the College of Public Health where he teaches Advanced Social Policy in the Graduate College.

Foege is married to Susan Salter. They are parents of six adult children and ten grandchildren.

Foege was re-elected in 2006 with 8,055 votes (60%), defeating Republican opponent Emma Nemecek.

Iowa House of Representatives
Preceded by Lynn Schulte	50th District; 1996 – 2002	Succeeded by Dave Tjepkes
Preceded by Nathan Willems	29th District; 2002 – 2008	Succeeded by Nathan Willems
