= 2018 Iowa Attorney General election =

- November 6, 2018
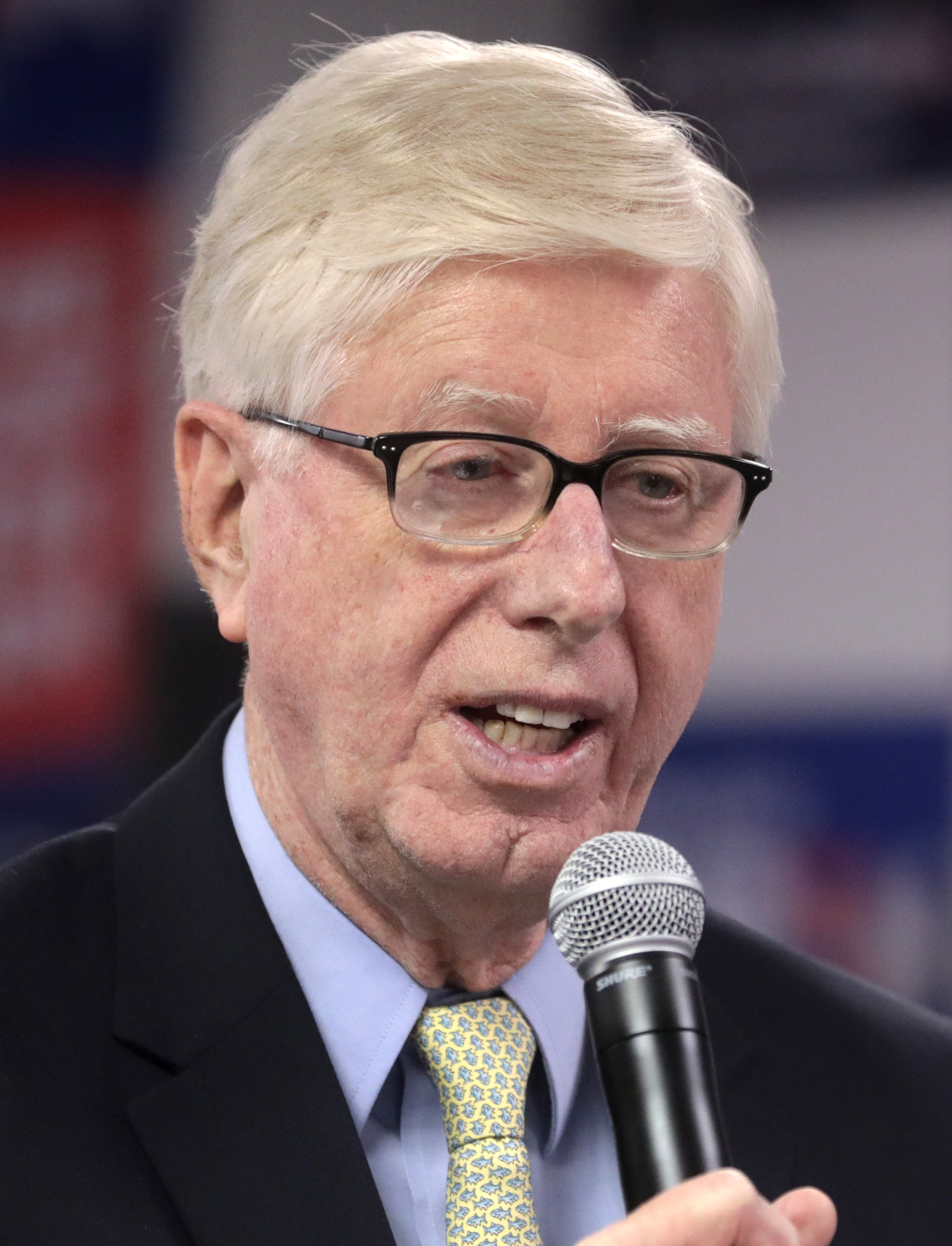

Candidate	Tom Miller	Marco Battaglia
Party	Democratic	Libertarian
Popular vote	880,531	262,131
Percentage	76.51%	22.78%
- Miller: 50–60% 60–70% 70–80% 80–90% >90%
Attorney General before election
Tom Miller
Democratic
Elected Attorney General
Tom Miller
Democratic

The 2018 Iowa Attorney General election took place on November 6, 2018, to elect the Attorney General of Iowa. The election was held concurrently with that year's gubernatorial election.

Incumbent Democratic Attorney General Tom Miller won re-election with 76.5% of the vote. The Republican Party did not nominate anyone, but the Libertarian Party nominated Marco Battaglia.

== Democratic primary ==
=== Candidates ===
==== Nominee ====
- Tom Miller, incumbent Attorney General

Democratic primary results
Party	Candidate	Votes	%
Democratic	Tom Miller (incumbent)	157,483	99.7
Democratic	Write-ins	546	0.3
Total votes		158,029	100.0

== Other candidates ==
=== Libertarian Party ===
==== Nominee ====
- Marco Battaglia, 2014 gubernatorial candidate

== General election ==
=== Predictions ===
Source	Ranking	As of
Governing	Safe D	October 26, 2018

=== Results ===
Tom Miller won re-election in a landslide victory with 76.51% of the vote.

2018 Iowa Attorney General election
Party	Candidate	Votes	%
Democratic	Tom Miller (incumbent)	880,531	76.51
Libertarian	Marco Battaglia	262,131	22.78
Write-in		8,237	0.72
Total votes		1,150,899	100%
Democratic hold			
