= Brenna Bird =

American politician (born 1976)

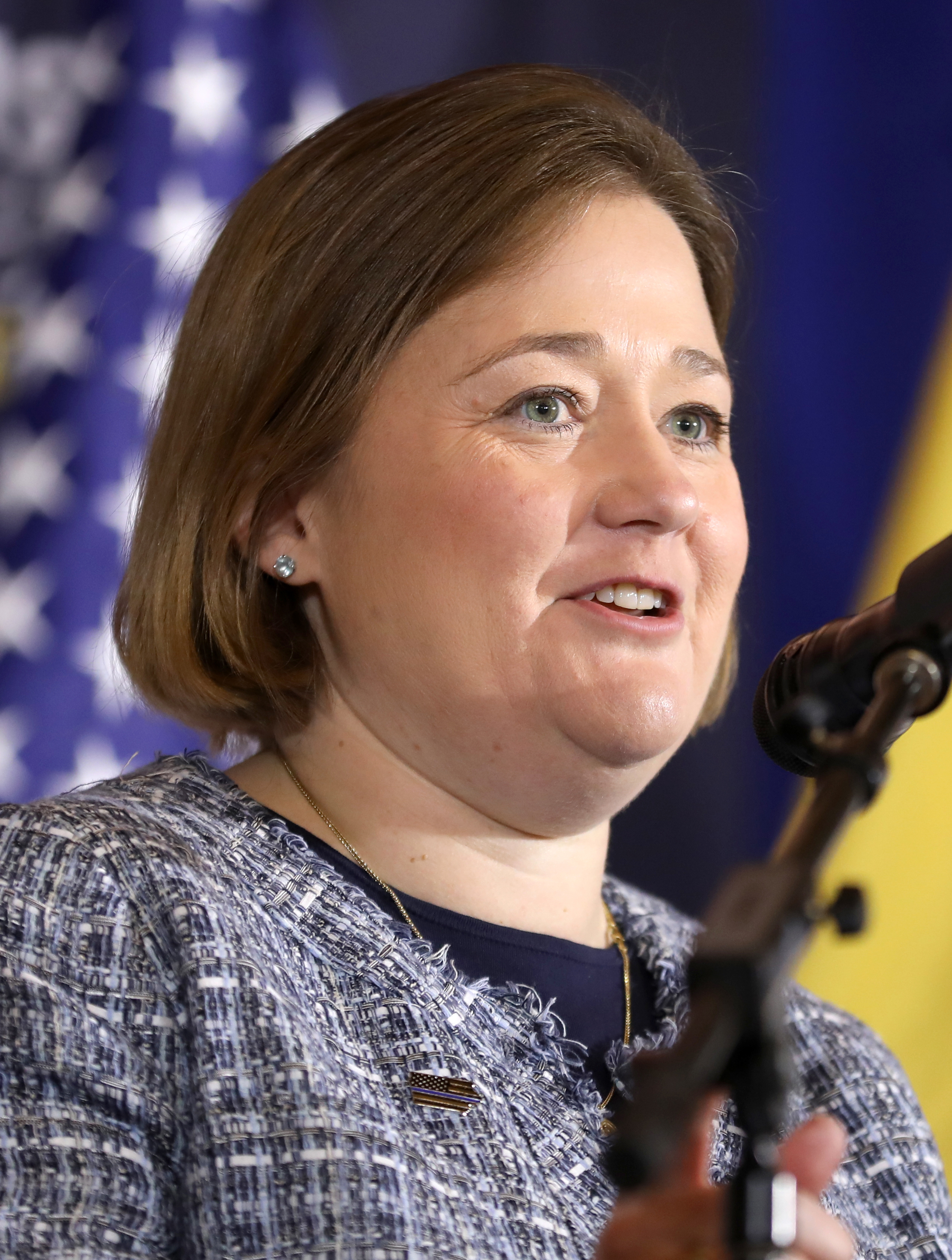
- Bird in 2024

33rd Attorney General of Iowa
- Incumbent
- Assumed office January 3, 2023
- Governor: Kim Reynolds
- Preceded by: Tom Miller

Personal details
- Born: Sharon Brenna Findley; March 4, 1976 (age 50) Dexter, Iowa, U.S.
- Party: Republican
- Spouse: Bob Bird
- Education: Drake University (BA); University of Chicago (JD)

Sharon Brenna Bird (née Findley; born March 4, 1976) is an American lawyer and politician who has served as Iowa Attorney General since 2023. She is a member of the Republican Party.

== Early life and education ==
Bird grew up on a farm near Dexter, Iowa. She earned her bachelor's degree from Drake University and her J.D. degree from the University of Chicago Law School in 2001.

== Career ==
From 2003 to 2010, Bird worked for U.S. Representative Steve King, including serving as his chief of staff.

In the 2010 elections, Bird ran for Attorney General of Iowa. She lost to incumbent Tom Miller by 11 percent. She considered running for the U.S. House of Representatives in the 2014 elections, but opted against running.

Bird served as counsel to Governor Terry Branstad. She was "county attorney in Fremont County, Audubon County" and became county attorney for Guthrie County, Iowa in 2018. In 2019, after hearing "six weeks of evidence, including testimony from Branstad and others," a jury ruled that Branstad and Bird (then known as Brenna Findley) had discriminated against an employee in 2010-2011 because of his sexual orientation, and awarded him $1.5 million, but the verdict was overturned by the Iowa Supreme Court in 2021.

She ran against Miller in the 2022 Iowa Attorney General election. She narrowly defeated Miller, who had served ten four-year terms as attorney general.

On April 9, 2023, Bird's office ordered a pause in the state's practice of paying for emergency contraception or abortions for rape victims.

Bird's office also filed or joined more than a dozen multi-state lawsuits against the Biden administration in 2023 and at least a dozen more in 2024.

Bird's office also joined a suit, Texas v. Becerra, in the United States District Court Northern District Of Texas Lubbock Division asking the court to "vacate a federal rule prohibiting discrimination against disabled people in health care settings, [and] to declare a 1973 law known as Section 504 unconstitutional.

On July 2, 2025, Bird confirmed that she was not running for governor and was instead running for re-election. On November 3, 2026, Bird was defeated by former state representative Nathan Willems.

== Personal life ==
Bird lives with her husband, Bob Bird, and their son on her family farm in southeastern Guthrie County. Bird is a member of the All Saints Church.

== Electoral history ==
2010 Iowa Attorney General election
Party	Candidate	Votes	%
Democratic	Tom Miller (incumbent)	607,779	55.5%
Republican	Brenna Findley	486,057	44.4%
Write-in		797	0.07%
Total votes		1,094,633	100.0%
Democratic hold			

2022 Iowa Attorney General election
Party	Candidate	Votes	%
Republican	Brenna Bird	611,432	50.8%
Democratic	Tom Miller (incumbent)	590,890	49.1%
Write-in		801	0.07%
Total votes		1,203,123	100.00%
Republican gain from Democratic			

Party political offices
Vacant Title last held by David Millage; 2002	Republican nominee for Attorney General of Iowa; 2010	Succeeded by Adam Gregg
Vacant Title last held by Adam Gregg; 2014	Republican nominee for Attorney General of Iowa; 2022	Most recent
Legal offices
Preceded by Tom Miller	Attorney General of Iowa; 2023–present	Incumbent
