= Albert J. Meyer (economist) =

American economist

Albert Julius Meyer (14 May 1919 – 31 October 1983) was an American economist who taught at Harvard University for 28 years. Meyers specialized in the economies of south-west Asia.

Meyer was born in Hawarden, Iowa. obtained his bachelors and master's degrees at the University of California at Los Angeles. In 1947 he received his doctorate from Johns Hopkins University. Among his seminal papers was "Entrepreneurship the missing link in the Arab states?" In 1955, he started teaching at Harvard. While at Harvard he produced two major books:

- Middle Eastern Capitalism: Nine essays (1959) and
- The Economy of Cyprus (1962)

Myers was chief of mission for the Special U.S. Economic Mission to Saudi Arabia, June 13–30, 1962, that led to closer U.S. ties with the kingdom.

Meyers was married to Anne Avantaggio and they had three children. He died of leukemia in Boston and his papers are maintained at the Harvard University Archives.
