= Maharam's theorem =

Mathematical theorem regarding decomposability of measure spaces

In mathematics, Maharam's theorem is a deep result about the decomposability of measure spaces, which plays an important role in the theory of Banach spaces. In brief, it states that every complete measure space is decomposable into "non-atomic parts" (copies of products of the unit interval [0,1] on the reals), and "purely atomic parts," using the counting measure on some discrete space. The theorem is due to Dorothy Maharam. It was extended to localizable measure spaces by Irving Segal.

The result is important to classical Banach space theory, in that, when considering the Banach space given as an L_{p} space of measurable functions over a general measurable space, it is sufficient to understand it in terms of its decomposition into non-atomic and atomic parts.

Maharam's theorem can also be translated into the language of abelian von Neumann algebras. Every abelian von Neumann algebra is isomorphic to a product of σ-finite abelian von Neumann algebras, and every σ-finite abelian von Neumann algebra is isomorphic to a spatial tensor product of discrete abelian von Neumann algebras; that is, algebras of bounded functions on a discrete set.

A similar theorem was given by Kazimierz Kuratowski for Polish spaces, stating that they are isomorphic, as Borel spaces, to either the reals, the integers, or a finite set.
