= 2022 Iowa Attorney General election =

- November 8, 2022
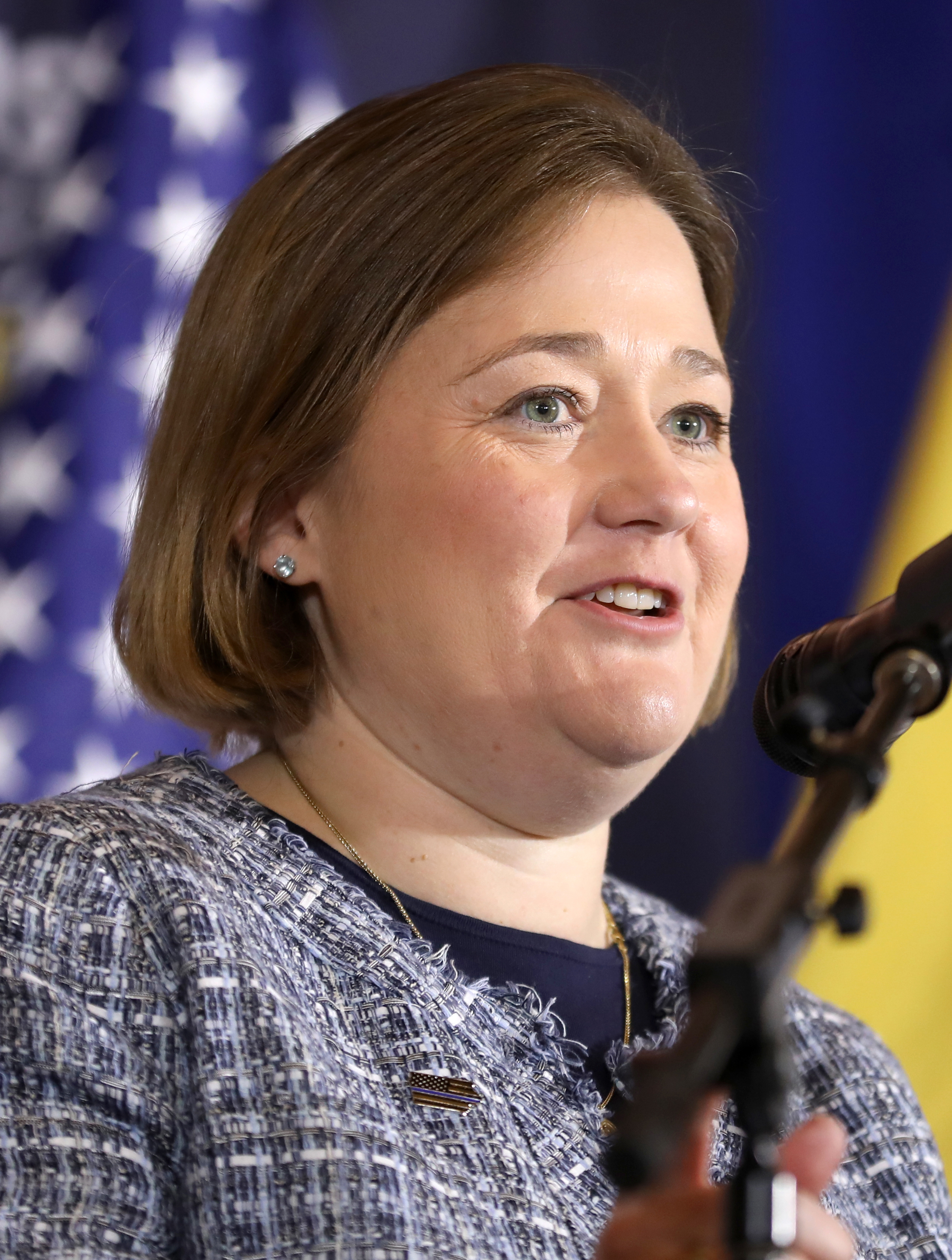

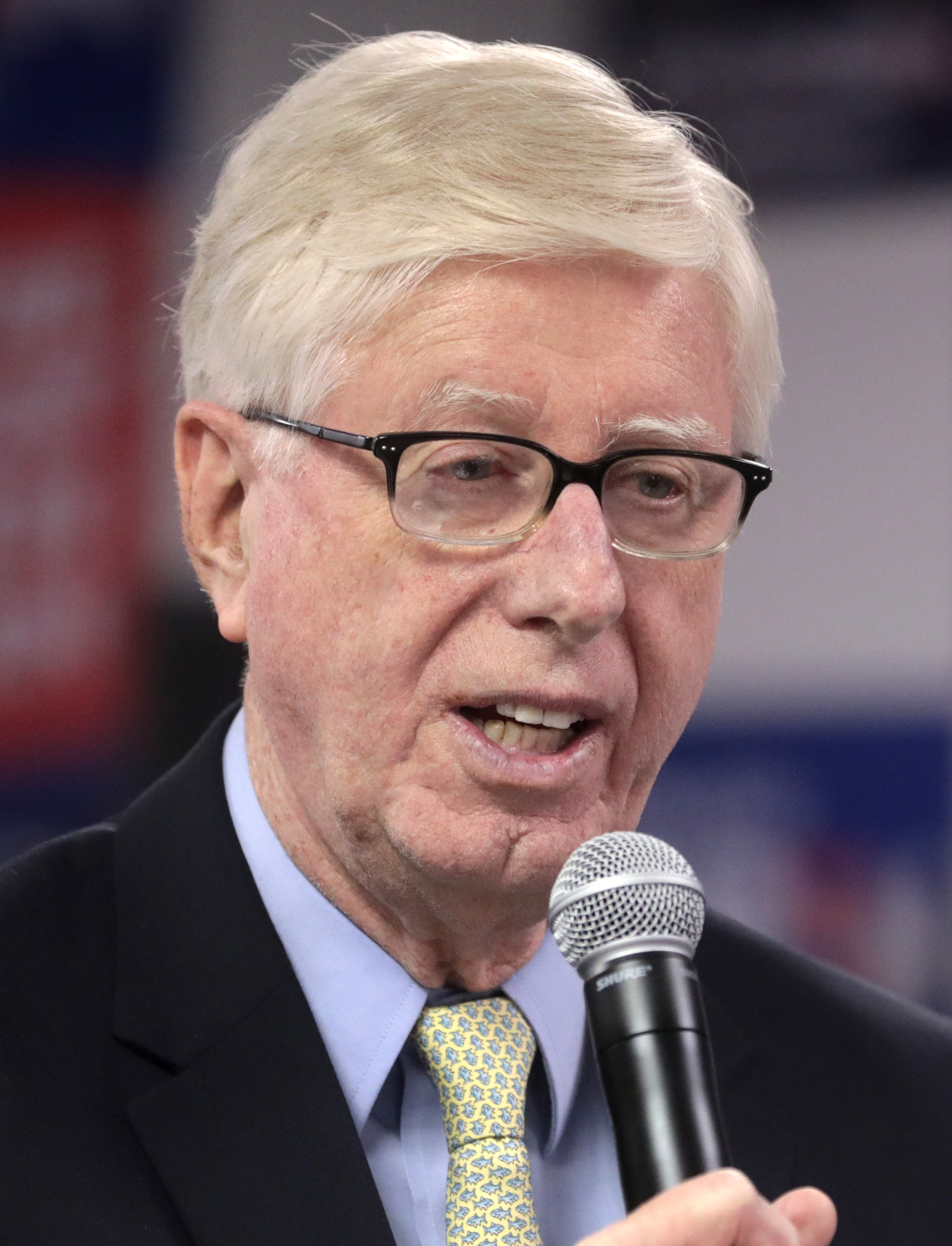
Nominee	Brenna Bird	Tom Miller
Party	Republican	Democratic
Popular vote	611,432	590,890
Percentage	50.82%	49.11%
- Bird: 40–50% 50–60% 60–70% 70–80% 80–90% >90% Miller: 40–50% 50–60% 60–70% 70–80% 80–90% >90% Tie: 40–50% 50%
Attorney General before election
Tom Miller
Democratic
Elected Attorney General
Brenna Bird
Republican

The 2022 Iowa Attorney General election took place on November 8, 2022, to elect the Attorney General of Iowa. Incumbent Democratic Attorney General Tom Miller, who was first elected Attorney General in 1978, ran for re-election to an eleventh overall term, but was narrowly defeated by Republican nominee Brenna Bird, the county attorney for Guthrie County. Bird received 50.8% of the vote while Miller received 49.1% of the vote.

This was a rematch from 2010, when Tom Miller won by 11.1%.

== Democratic primary ==
=== Candidates ===
==== Nominee ====
- Tom Miller, incumbent attorney general

=== Results ===
Democratic primary results
Party	Candidate	Votes	%
Democratic	Tom Miller (incumbent)	146,284	99.73%
Write-in		399	0.27%
Total votes		146,683	100.0%

== Republican primary ==
=== Candidates ===
==== Nominee ====
- Brenna Bird, Guthrie County attorney (2018–2023) and nominee for attorney general in 2010

=== Results ===
Republican primary results
Party	Candidate	Votes	%
Republican	Brenna Bird	163,114	99.59%
Write-in		670	0.41%
Total votes		163,784	100.0%

== General election ==
=== Predictions ===
Source	Ranking	As of
Sabato's Crystal Ball	Lean D	November 3, 2022
Elections Daily	Lean D	November 1, 2022

=== Polling ===
Graphical summary

Poll source	Date(s) administered	Sample size (Note: Key: A – all adults RV – registered voters LV – likely voters V – unclear)	Margin of error	Tom Miller (D)	Brenna Bird (R)	Other	Undecided
Selzer & Co.	October 31 – November 3, 2022	801 (LV)	± 3.5%	47%	45%	4% (Note: "Someone else" with 2%; "Don't want to tell" with 1%; "Would not vote" with 1%)	5%
Cygnal (R) (Note: Poll sponsored by the Iowans for Tax Relief Foundation)	October 26–27, 2022	600 (LV)	± 4.0%	46%	44%	–	11%
Selzer & Co.	October 9–12, 2022	620 (LV)	± 3.9%	49%	33%	12% (Note: "Would not vote" with 7%; "Someone else" with 5%)	6%
Cygnal (R)	October 2–4, 2022	600 (LV)	± 4.0%	43%	46%	–	12%
Cygnal (R)	July 13–14, 2022	600 (LV)	± 4.0%	45%	44%	–	12%
Cygnal (R)	February 20–22, 2022	610 (LV)	± 3.9%	41%	46%	–	13%

=== Results ===
State Senate district results

2022 Iowa Attorney General election
Party	Candidate	Votes	%	±%
Republican	Brenna Bird	611,432	50.82%	N/A
Democratic	Tom Miller (incumbent)	590,890	49.11%	−27.40%
Write-in		801	0.07%	-7.09%
Total votes		1,202,322	100.0%	
Republican gain from Democratic				

==== By congressional district ====
Despite losing the state, Miller won three of four congressional districts, all of which elected Republicans.

District	Miller	Bird	Representative
1st	50.53%	49.40%	Mariannette Miller-Meeks
2nd	51.23%	48.71%	Ashley Hinson
3rd	54.40%	45.52%	Cindy Axne (117th Congress)
3rd	54.40%	45.52%	Zach Nunn (118th Congress)
4th	39.24%	60.69%	Randy Feenstra

== See also ==
- Elections in Iowa
- Political party strength in Iowa
- 2022 United States attorney general elections
- 2022 Iowa elections

== Notes ==
Partisan clients
