= Maharam algebra =

In mathematics, a Maharam algebra is a complete Boolean algebra with a continuous submeasure (defined below). They were introduced by Dorothy Maharam in 1947.

== Definitions ==
A continuous submeasure or Maharam submeasure on a Boolean algebra is a real-valued function m such that

- $m(0)=0, m(1)=1,$ and $m(x)>0$ if $x\ne 0$.
- If $x\le y$, then $m(x)\le m(y)$.
- $m(x\vee y)\le m(x)+m(y)-m(x\wedge y)$.
- If $x_n$ is a decreasing sequence with greatest lower bound 0, then the sequence $m(x_n)$ has limit 0.

A Maharam algebra is a complete Boolean algebra with a continuous submeasure.

== Examples ==
Every probability measure is a continuous submeasure, so as the corresponding Boolean algebra of measurable sets modulo measure zero sets is complete, it is a Maharam algebra.

Michel Talagrand solved a long-standing problem by constructing a Maharam algebra that is not a measure algebra, i.e., that does not admit any countably additive strictly positive finite measure.
