= Calliope, Iowa =

Coordinates: 43.00777°N 96.48864°W

Calliope, Iowa was an incorporated town in northwestern Iowa. Calliope was formally incorporated in 1882. It served as the county seat of Sioux County, Iowa. The town of Calliope was annexed by the neighboring town of Hawarden, Iowa in 1893.

== History ==
The Dutch settlers of Sioux County found politics and county offices in the hands of a few Americans at Calliope, Iowa. The town was laid out in 1860 on the Big Sioux River and less than one mile north of the business section of the present town of Hawarden. A portion of it is now included within the corporate limits of Hawarden and is still often referred to as Calliope. Calliope was the county seat from 1860 until 1872 when thereafter, it changed to Orange City, Post Office, 1862 to 1863, and again from 1869 to 1911.

The Dutch Americans felt they had a right to vote because they were the same as the Americans. This did not sit well with some American settlers. Tiete Pool (pronounced Tee’-ta) was born in Drachten, a province of Friesland, Holland. He was the first child of Stephanas and Hijlkje Pool he was one of the Dutch settlers. Tiete Pool was educated and spoke several languages, as it is the custom of many European scholars to teach children other languages. In Holland he was often called upon to be a substitute teacher. Tiete at 17 immigrated to America. A clear account of this was written in Jacob Can der Zee’s book, “The Hollanders of Iowa,” published in 1912 by the Iowa State Historical Society, in the chapter entitled “Politics in Sioux County.” In 1871, Holland-Americans nominated three candidates for county offices who were later elected: Dutch-born Henry Hospers to the board of supervisors, A.J. Betten as auditor, and J. W. Greattrax as treasurer.

The victorious Holland-Americans were excited of the win the seats and traveled twenty-three miles across the vast countryside, through blizzards and bone chilling weather to perform their duties at Calliope. On or around January 22, 1872, three offices-elect journeyed from Orange City to the county seat, where the board of supervisors conveyed. Hospers at that time took the oath of office elected for him, but when the other Holland-Americans stepped forward and presented their official bonds, the board members of Calliope refused them and did not accept their bonds. Disappointed, about this unreasonable act, a team of about 150 men, three-fifths of them were Holland-Americans, hitched up their teams, and bobsleds, went to the Court House in Calliope. It has been reported that when all the men arrived, the chairman of the board of supervisors hastily adjourned the court and was preparing to flee to the Dakotas. The two men confronted him with the 150 men behind them and respectfully, asked to be placed in the office elect.

A Sioux City lawyer, aided by Hospers, immediately pleaded the merits of the case for a few hours. All arguments fell on deaf ears. The 150 men visitors called upon the county treasurer to surrender his key and allow them access to the county records and documents. A key was given to them, but it failed to open the safe and they did not have access to the documents. Since there were no other recourse, the men decided to take matters into their own hands. They backed a sled against one corner of the courthouse, chopped a large hole in the building, and took the steel safe. All the men went back home with the safe, across the prairies and in a blizzard. The safe was heavy and too much for them to carry, so they left it in snow drift. Their plan was to retrieve it the next day. The following day, a receptionist met them when they returned home. That day a “thousand guns were fired in honor of the occasion”. Several days passed, and the sheriff came to announce that the board of supervisors would capitulate. With this good news and several yoke of oxen, the men took the safe and the contents back to Calliope.

The county seat was later changed to Orange City, named in honor of the Royal House of Orange. Tiete later served as Deputy Sheriff of Sioux County and farmed in the Orange City area.
