= Nathan Willems =

American politician

Nate Willems
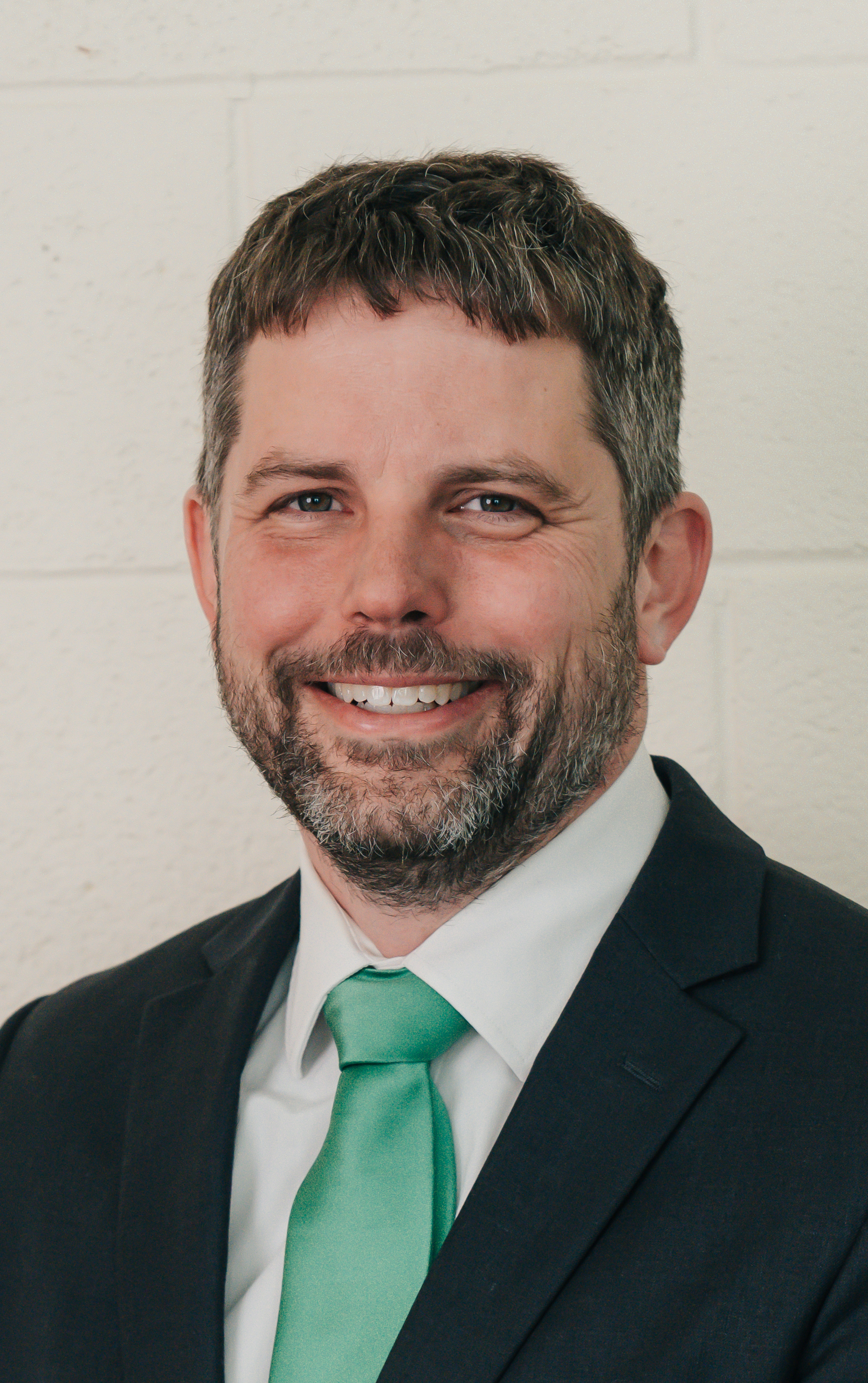
- Willems in 2025

Attorney General-elect of Iowa
- Assuming office January 2027
- Governor: Rob Sand (elect)
- Succeeding: Brenna Bird

Member of the Iowa House of Representatives from the 29th district
- In office January 12, 2009 – January 14, 2013
- Preceded by: Ro Foege
- Succeeded by: Dan Zumbach

Personal details
- Born: 1979 (age 46–47) Anamosa, Iowa, U.S.
- Party: Democratic
- Spouse: Margret Willems
- Children: 3 daughters
- Education: Georgetown University (BS); University of Iowa (JD)
- Website: State House website Campaign website

Nathan Willems is an American lawyer and politician who represented the 29th District in the Iowa House of Representatives from 2009 to 2013, and the Attorney general-elect of Iowa. He is a Democrat.

== Education ==
Willems holds a B.S. in Foreign Service from Georgetown University's Edmund A. Walsh School of Foreign Service (2001) and a J.D. from the University of Iowa College of Law (2007).

== Career ==
Willems was a field organizer for Congressman Leonard Boswell's 1998 reelection campaign. He managed two Iowa House races in 2000. In 2001 he worked on the unsuccessful United States House campaigns of John Norris and Julie Thomas. He was a legislative clerk for Iowa Representative Ro Foege, whom he later succeeded in the Iowa House. He was a regional director for Howard Dean's Iowa caucus campaign. He worked one summer in the legal department of Iowa Union of Operating Engineers Local 49 before taking his current job as an attorney at Rush & Nicholson, P.L.C., practicing labor and employment law.

In September 2011, Willems served on Iowa House committees for Education (ranking member), Labor, and Ways and Means. He also sat on the Education Appropriations Subcommittee. He was elected in 2008, defeating Republican opponent Emma Nemencek and was re-elected in 2010.

Willems is active in the Linn County Democratic Central Committee, the Lisbon Lincoln Highway Lions Club, the Mount Vernon Athletic Boosters, and is First Vice President of the Iowa Federation of Teachers.

In 2025, Willems announced he was running for attorney general, challenging incumbent Republican Brenna Bird. He won the Democratic primary on June 2, 2026. Willems was elected Attorney General of Iowa on November 3, 2026.

== Electoral history ==
*incumbent

Election	Political result	Candidate	Party	Votes	%
Iowa House of Representatives elections, 2008; District 29; Turnout: 18,015	Democratic hold	Nate Willems	Democratic	10,524	58.4
Iowa House of Representatives elections, 2008; District 29; Turnout: 18,015	Democratic hold	Emma Nemecek	Republican	7,469	41.5
Iowa House of Representatives elections, 2010; District 29; Turnout: 14,862	Democratic hold	Nathan Willems*	Democratic	7,487	50.4
Iowa House of Representatives elections, 2010; District 29; Turnout: 14,862	Democratic hold	Shawn Graham	Republican	6,658	44.8
