= Siouxland Conference =

Iowa High School athletic conference

- Conference: IHSAA / IGHSAU
- Founded: 1952
- No. of teams: 15
- Region: Northwest Iowa
- Website: www.siouxlandconference.org

The Siouxland Conference is a high school athletic conference in the northwest corner of Iowa. Historically it consisted of schools ranging from the smallest class (1A) to the third largest class (3A), although all member schools currently belong to Class 2A or 3A. The conference is known for its prominence in small school basketball.

== Members ==
Institution	Location	Mascot	Colors	Affiliation	2026-2027 BEDS	IHSAA class
Boyden-Hull	Hull	Comets		Public	126	2A
Central Lyon	Rock Rapids	Lions		Public	181	2A
Cherokee, Washington	Cherokee	Braves		Public	282	2A
Estherville–Lincoln Central	Estherville	Midgets; Midgettes		Public	274	2A
MOC/Floyd Valley	Orange City	Dutchmen; Lady Dutch		Public	340	3A
Okoboji	Milford	Pioneers		Public	250	2A
Rock Valley	Rock Valley	Rockets		Public	179	2A
Sheldon	Sheldon	Orabs		Public	276	2A
Sioux Center	Sioux Center	Warriors		Public	395	3A
Spencer	Spencer	Tigers		Public	511	3A
Spirit Lake	Spirit Lake	Indians		Public	283	2A
Storm Lake	Storm Lake	Tornadoes		Public	643	3A
Unity Christian	Orange City	Knights		Private	258	2A
West Lyon	Inwood	Wildcats		Public	196	2A
Western Christian	Hull	Wolfpack		Private	233	2A

=== Common cooperatives ===
Name	Schools participating	Mascot	Colors	Sports shared
BHRV	Boyden-Hull, Rock Valley	Nighthawks		Football, wrestling, baseball, track and field, cross country, softball
CL/G-LR	Central Lyon, George–Little Rock	Lions		Football
G-LR/CL	George–Little Rock, Central Lyon	Mustangs		Cross-country, wrestling
SSO	Sheldon, South O'Brien	Orabs		Wrestling
SLP	Spirit Lake, Harris–Lake Park	Indians		Wrestling

== History ==
The Siouxland Conference was founded in 1952 and began play in the 1953–54 school year. Originally the league was made up of: Inwood, George and Rock Rapids from Lyon County; Orange City, and Hawarden from Sioux County; and Akron and Le Mars Gehlen from Plymouth County. Rock Valley replaced Augustana Academy of Canton, South Dakota, in 1960. West Sioux of Hawarden left the conference in 1965, and rejoined for a short period in the 1970s. Boyden–Hull became a conference member by 1965. Sioux Center, formerly of the Sioux Empire Conference, and Central Lyon of Rock Rapids joined the Siouxland Conference in 1967. Akron withdrew from the league at the conclusion of the 1975 baseball season. Little Rock merged with George to become George–Little Rock in 1989. The league then went through a set of changes in the early 1990s when it added Sibley–Ocheyedan from the Lakes Conference, and Hartley–Melvin–Sanborn and Okoboji from the disbanded Sioux Valley Conference. Maurice–Orange City merged with Floyd Valley to become MOC–Floyd Valley in 1994. The conference remained the same until Hartley–Mevin–Sanborn left for the War Eagle Conference in 2009 and longtime Sibley–Ocheyedan rival Sheldon moved in from the Lakes Conference. Through 2022, War Eagle Conference member Unity Christian, located in Orange City, Iowa, applied for membership to the conference at least five times, and been denied four times. Former Lakes Conference member and Western Christian had applied twice, and denied each time as well.

On September 20, 2022, George–Little Rock applied for membership to the War Eagle Conference. The War Eagle Conference approved membership of the Mustangs on October 20, 2022. In October 2022, the Siouxland Conference finally accepted the membership application of Unity Christian, whom swapped conferences with George–Little Rock.

In October 2024, Siouxland Conference president Steve Grond stated that several current and former Lakes Conference schools had been denied entry into the Siouxland Conference. Negotiations continued, and, in December 2024, the Siouxland Conference extended invitations to Cherokee, Estherville–Lincoln Central, Spencer and Storm Lake to join from the defunct Lakes Conference starting with the 2026-27 academic year. The Siouxland Conference officially announced on January 8, 2025 that these schools will officially join the conference on August 1, 2026 along with former Lakes Conference members Spirit Lake and Western Christian to form a 16-school superconference.

On February 21, 2025, the Sibley–Ocheyedan school board applied for membership in the War Eagle Conference. On March 31, 2025, it was announced that the application was approved and that the school would leave the Siouxland Conference for the War Eagle Conference effective for the 2025-26 academic year. Sibley–Ocheyedan superintendent Stan De Zeeuw explained that that the school, which already has the second lowest enrollment in the Siouxland Conference, wanted to align with schools of a similar size, especially in light of the upcoming addition of the six former Lakes Conference schools.

=== Basketball ===
==== Men ====
As an independent school, Sioux Center won the big school state title in 1959, followed by the small school state title in 1967, in its first year within the Siouxland Conference. Maurice-Orange City claimed the 2A state championship in 1987–88 and again in 1988–89, and won the 3A title in 2004–05 as MOC–Floyd Valley. Rock Valley has won the championship in 1996, 1998, 2009, and 2010. In 2003, Boyden-Hull was class 1A state champ, while Sioux Center won the 2A title. George–Little Rock won the 1A title in 2006. Boyden-Hull won back to back 1A titles in 2012 and 2013. In 2013, Sheldon also won the 2A championship. West Lyon won the 1A championship in 2014, keeping it in the conference for three straight years. Boyden–Hull won its first 2A title in 2020. The Comets competed in the 2A basketball final again in 2021, losing to Western Christian, a team also located in Hull, as a member of the Lakes Conference. It was the first time since 2005 that the two teams had played against each other, and also the first time in Iowa High School Athletic Association history that two teams from the same city met in a title game. in 2022 Rock Valley won its first 2A title by defeating Siouxland conference foe Central Lyon in the title game. After splitting the season series by 2 points each game, Rock Valley rolled to a 23 point victory in the rubber match in Des Moines. In 2023 Central Lyon avenged their state championship game loss the previous year by defeating Western Christian to win the 2A crown. In 2025, MOC-Floyd Valley won the Class 3A championship by defeating Clear Lake. In 2026, Unity Christian also took the 2A title, toppling Kuemper Catholic. With Western Christian joining the conference for the 2026-27 year, current Siouxland Conference schools have won the 2A Men's Basketball State Title the last 7 seasons and 12 out of the last 17 years.

==== Women ====
Sibley–Ocheyedan won two basketball titles (1986 and 1996), while Rock Valley has three (2001–2003). Central Lyon won the 1A title in 2013. MOC–Floyd Valley won the 3A championship the following season, besting their previous best result, second place in 1997. In 2017 and 2018 Sioux Center was 3A runner-up losing to Pocahontas Area and Crestwood respectively. In 2022 and 2023 Central Lyon was runner-up losing both times to Dike-New Hartford. Sioux Center won the Class 3A title in 2023, their first in school history. In 2025, Central Lyon was runner-up in 2A losing to Hinton in the championship game. Rock Valley won the 2A crown in 2026 defeating the defending champs, Hinton.

=== Other sports ===
The schools hold many other state titles as well, including football, which is no longer a sanctioned conference sport since the state took control of the entire system in the mid-1990s and created a two-year rotating district system. Nevertheless, Sibley holds a title, while Sioux Center has two and Central Lyon holds two on their own and one more sharing with George–Little Rock with 2 runners-up in class 2A. West Lyon has won five titles (1998, 1999, 2010, 2013, 2019) and finished as class 1A runner up in 2008 and 2014 and 2A runner up in 1995. Boyden-Hull/Rock Valley was class 2A runner up for football in 2009 before winning it all in 2016. Before sharing sports with Rock Valley, Boyden-Hull tied West Harrison for the 1970 Class B track championship. Maurice-Orange City has won the state track championship three times, Sioux Center twice, George and Okoboji once each. Rock Valley has three state golf titles, all won as a member of the Siouxland Conference. Central Lyon and Sheldon have each won a cross country championship. Sibley-Ocheyedan won a women's Class 2A cross country title in 1997. Rock Valley is the only team in the conference to win a baseball championship. With the addition of six teams in the 2026-27 year soccer was officially added as a Siouxland Conference sport.

=== Sports offered ===
The conference offers the following sports:

- Summer – baseball and softball
- Fall – football, cross country and volleyball
- Winter – basketball and wrestling
- Spring – track and field, soccer, and golf
