= Sioux Valley Conference =

Former High School athletic conference

The Sioux Valley Conference was a high school athletic conference in northwest Iowa that existed until 1988–89. The conference dates back to at least the early 1930s and is notable for its stability throughout its history. From 1949 until 1988, no school left or joined the league, although a few schools did grow through consolidation over the years. During its existence, it was one of the premier small school conferences in the state for boys' sports, boasting six state champions in basketball, two in football (in the 9 short years it coexisted with the state playoffs), and six in track & field.

== Former Members ==
Institution	Mascot	Colors	Affiliation	Last Year	Current Iteration	Current Conference
Alta	Cyclones		Public	2011	Alta–Aurelia Community School District	Twin Lakes Conference
Aurelia	Bulldogs/Atoms		Public	2011	Alta–Aurelia Community School District	Twin Lakes Conference
Cleghorn	Mustangs		Public	1960	MMCRU	War Eagle Conference
Hartley	Hawks		Public	1980	Hartley–Melvin–Sanborn Community School District	War Eagle Conference
Hartley-Melvin	Hawks		Public	1988	Hartley–Melvin–Sanborn Community School District	War Eagle Conference
Harris-Lake Park	Wolves		Public	1963	Harris–Lake Park Community School District	War Eagle Conference
Marcus	Eagles		Public	1963	MMCRU	War Eagle Conference
Milford	Pioneers		Public	1987	Okoboji Community School District	War Eagle Conference
Paullina	Panthers		Public	1988	South O'Brien Community School District	War Eagle Conference
Primghar	Bulldogs		Public	1988	South O'Brien Community School District	War Eagle Conference
Sanborn	Bulldogs		Public	1988	Hartley–Melvin–Sanborn Community School District	War Eagle Conference
Sioux Rapids	Indians		Public	1979	Sioux Central Community School District	Twin Lakes Conference
Sutherland	Tigers		Public	1990	South O'Brien Community School District	War Eagle Conference

In the 1980s, a series of consolidations led to Hartley being rebranded as Hartley–Melvin and Milford as Okoboji. In 1988, Paullina, Primghar, and Sutherland entered a three-way sharing agreement and became known as the South O'Brien Wolverines. Hartley–Melvin also merged with Sanborn to become the H-M-S Hawks. Alta and Aurelia opted to share sports under the Alta-Aurelia Warriors moniker. For a short time during the 1970s Harris–Lake Park was also a football-only member of the conference, replacing Sanborn in the loop.

== History ==
The Sioux Valley was formed in November 1933, holding its first championship competition later that season in the form of a basketball tournament. The conference was originally composed of six schools: Aurelia and Marcus of Cherokee County, Alta and Sioux Rapids of Buena Vista County, and Paullina and Sutherland of O'Brien County. By 1942, the conference had expanded to 10 members. After the exit of Marcus for the 1936–37 school year, Hartley and Primghar joined the conference. The next year, Cleghorn joined. Sanborn became the ninth member in 1941, and Milford became the tenth for the 1942–43 school year. Due to World War II, competition was put on hold for one year, though some schools continued to field athletic teams, in 1944–45. When play resumed the next season, Cleghorn opted not to return to the league. Four years later, Sioux Rapids, which was the smallest school in the league, dropped out to compete in a new league, the Little Northwestern Conference. Harris–Lake Park also competed in the conference for a brief period in the 1960s and 1970s as a football-only member. During this time Sanborn did not compete in the league for football.

For the next 40 years, the conference lineup would continue unchanged. During this time the conference established itself as one of the premier small-school conferences in the state, especially in basketball, as the conference won 6 of the first 15 Class 1A basketball tournaments staged by the Iowa High School Athletic Association. Conference schools were also traditionally strong in track & field, as a conference school placed in the top two at the state meet 15 times between 1956 and 1989.

In the late 1980s, however, shrinking school enrollments in northwest Iowa prompted numerous consolidations, causing the conference to disband. After students from the very small Melvin school district began competing with Hartley in 1980–81, Milford merged with Arnolds Park in 1987–88. The consolidate school adopted the Okoboji Pioneers moniker, and while it remained part of the Sioux Valley, it was much larger than some of the other schools in the conference at the time, and began exploring new conference options. In 1988–89, league membership, for the first time in over 50 years was reduced to six due, as two separate consolidations took place. Hartley–Melvin began sharing sports with Sanborn, as the H-M-S Hawks. Meanwhile, Paullina and Primghar entered into an all-sports sharing agreement. In football membership dwindled to four that year, as Aurelia began an all-sports sharing agreement with Alta and Sutherland joined Paullina-Primghar under the South O'Brien Wolverines moniker.

Following the 1988–89 season, the league officially disbanded with H-M-S joining the Siouxland Conference, South O'Brien competing in the War Eagle Conference, and Alta-Aurelia joining the Twin Lakes. Okoboji competed as an independent for one season before joining H-M-S in the Siouxland.

== State qualifiers ==
=== Baseball ===
- Paullina: 1984-2nd

=== Men's basketball ===
- Alta: 1932 1971-2nd, 1972-Class A Champs, 1975-3rd
- Aurelia: 1974, 1978-3rd
- Paullina: 1954-4th, 1968-Class A Champs, 1969-Class A Champs, 1970-Class A Champs, 1980, 1981-Class 1A Champs, 1982-Class 1A Champs
- Sutherland: 1967

=== Football ===
- Aurelia: 1986-2nd
- Milford: 1980
- Paullina: 1981-Class A Champs, 1984
- Paullina-Primghar-Sutherland: 1989
- Primghar: 1982
- Sanborn: 1985-2nd, 1987
- Sutherland: 1982, 1983-Class A Champs

=== Men's cross country ===
- Alta: 1964-2nd
- H-M-S: 1988
- Milford: 1973-Class C State Champs, 1979
- Sanborn: 1974-Class D State Champs, 1976; 1975 Class D Individual Champion (Dwayne Camarigg)
- Sutherland: 1966 Class C Individual Champion (Jerry Lundquist)

=== Men's golf ===
- Aurelia: 1989-Class 1A State Champs; 1979-Individual 2nd (Doug Lockin), 1985-Class 1A Individual Champion (Brian Lockin), 1986-Class 1A Individual Champion (Brian Lockin), 1989-Individual 2nd
- Hartley–Melvin: 1986-Class 1A State Champs; 1983-Individual 2nd
- Milford: 1985-2nd; 1975-Individual 2nd, 1979-Class A Individual Champion (Steve Schnell)
- Paullina: 1980-Class A Individual Champion (Todd Binder)
- Primghar: 1966-Individual 2nd

=== Men's track & field ===
- Alta: 1972-Class B State Champs, 1989-2nd
- Aurelia: 1956-2nd, 1962-2nd, 1966-2nd, 1982-2nd
- Paullina: 1962-Class B State Champs, 1981-Class C State Champs, 1984-2nd(t), 1985-2nd(t)
- Primghar: 1956-Class C State Champs
- Sanborn: 1988-Class 1A State Champs
- Sutherland: 1972-2nd, 1983-2nd, 1985-2nd(t)

=== Women's basketball ===
- Aurelia: 1978
- Hartley: 1944-4th, 1946, 1948-4th, 1949-4th, 1953, 1974, 1981
- Hartley–Melvin: 1983-4th, 1984, 1987, 1988
- H-M-S: 1989
- Sanborn: 1970

=== Women's golf ===
- Sanborn: 1987-Class 1A State Champs

=== Women's track & field ===
- Milford: 1979-2nd, 1987-2nd(t)
- Sanborn: 1987-2nd(t)

== Legacy ==
The eight schools that made up the Sioux Valley are now the primary makeup for four separate IHSAA schools: Okoboji of Milford, H-M-S of Hartley, South O'Brien of Paullina, and Alta-Aurelia. Following the breakup of the league, H-M-S and South O'Brien began whole-grade sharing and became officially reorganized school districts. Okoboji had already reorganized. Alta and Aurelia, on the other hand, maintained separate high schools, but continued to compete as a one team until 1996. At this time, the schools resumed their separate athletic programs, and helped spark the formation of the new Northwest Conference. In 2010–11, Alta and Aurelia resumed sharing, but this time class sharing was put in place as well. While the school districts remain legally separate entities, they currently share a high school and a middle school.
