= War Eagle Conference =

Iowa High School athletic conference

- Conference: IHSAA / IGHSAU
- Founded: 1979
- No. of teams: 12
- Region: Northwest Iowa
- Official website: www.wareagleconference.org

The War Eagle Conference is a 12-team high school athletic conference in Northwest Iowa. The schools are classified as 1A and 2A, the two smallest classes in Iowa. The conference is widely recognized as one of the best small school baseball conferences in the state, often sending multiple teams to the state tournament. The WEC has also been successful in boys basketball housing multiple state champions, the most recent being South O’Brien boys in 2015–16 as Class 1A state champions at a record of 25–3. Remsen St. Mary’s has been the most recent qualifiers the past two seasons (2016 and 2017)

== List of member schools ==
School	Location	Affiliation	Mascot	Colors	2026-2027 BEDS
Akron–Westfield	Akron	Public	Westerners		138
Gehlen Catholic	Le Mars	Private (Catholic)	Jays		101
George–Little Rock	George	Public	Mustangs		82
Harris–Lake Park	Lake Park	Public	Wolves		80
Hartley–Melvin–Sanborn	Hartley	Public	Hawks		158
Hinton	Hinton	Public	Blackhawks		173
MMCRU	Marcus	Public	Royals		139
Sibley-Ocheyedan	Sibley	Public	Generals		136
South O'Brien	Paullina	Public	Wolverines		119
St. Mary's Catholic	Remsen	Private (Catholic)	Hawks		37
Trinity Christian	Hull	Private (Calvinist)	Tigers		50
West Sioux	Hawarden	Public	Falcons		176

== History ==
The War Eagle Conference began in the 1979-1980 school year, when Akron, Hinton, Marcus, and Sergeant Bluff-Luton of the Little Sioux Conference partnered with Gehlen Catholic of the Quad County Conference and independent Floyd Valley. Two years later, Westfield consolidates with Akron to form Akron-Westfield High School. In 1988, Meriden-Cleghorn consolidated with Marcus to form Marcus-Meriden-Cleghorn School District. Up until this point, membership had remained at 6.

In 1989, Paullina-Primghar joined the conference from the Sioux Valley Conference, bringing the membership up to 7. A year later, Sutherland consolidated with Paullina-Primghar to form South O'Brien Community School District. West Sioux joined in 1990 from the Siouxland Conference, but Floyd Valley left when they consolidated with Maurice-Orange City to form MOC-Floyd Valley Community School District which kept membership at 7.

St. Mary's Catholic and Spalding Catholic joined in 1993 from the disbanding Big West Conference, as did an independent Unity Christian to bring membership up to 10 schools.

After years of stability as a ten-team league, 2009 saw the league add Remsen-Union from the Western Valley Activities Conference and Hartley–Melvin–Sanborn from the Siouxland Conference. A year later, Sergeant Bluff-Luton left to join the Missouri River Activities Conference, which contained four large schools in nearby Sioux City and two Council Bluffs schools. Enrollment at SBL had outgrown the rest of the conference, and they were the only school too big to compete in 1A or 2A classifications.

Spalding Catholic was absorbed by Gehlen Catholic before the 2013–14 school year. Formerly independent Trinity Christian, located in Hull took Spalding Catholic's spot in the schedule.

The War Eagle Conference accepted Harris–Lake Park and Clay Central–Everly at the beginning of the 2014–15 and 2015–16 school years, respectively, after the dissolution of the Cornbelt Conference.

Starting with the 2016–17 school year, Marcus-Meriden-Cleghorn entered a whole-grade sharing agreement with Remsen-Union to form the MMCRU Royals.

On March 11, 2019, Clay Central–Everly announced it would be closing its high school at the end of that school year, effectively ceasing all athletics.

On September 20, 2022, Siouxland Conference member George-Little Rock applied for membership to the War Eagle Conference. The War Eagle Conference accepted the Mustangs on October 20, 2022.

In October 2022, Unity Christian announced that their membership application to the Siouxland Conference had been accepted for the 2023-2024 school year, and therefore would no longer be members of the War Eagle Conference.

On February 21, 2025, the Sibley–Ocheyedan school board applied for membership in the War Eagle Conference. On March 31, 2025, it was announced that the application was approved and that the school would leave the Siouxland Conference for the War Eagle Conference effective for the 2025-26 academic year. Sibley–Ocheyedan superintendent Stan De Zeeuw explained that that the school, which already has the second lowest enrollment in the Siouxland Conference, wanted to align with schools of a similar size, especially in light of the upcoming addition of the six former Lakes Conference schools.

== Sports ==
The conference offers the following sports:

- Fall — Volleyball, boys' cross-country, and girls' cross-country.6-7
- Winter — Boys' basketball, girls' basketball, and wrestling.
- Spring — Boys' track and field, girls' track and field, boys' golf, and girls' golf.
- Summer — Baseball and softball.
