= Sioux Empire Conference =

1964–1966 high school sports league in Iowa and South Dakota

The Sioux Empire Conference was a high school athletic conference formed by schools in northwest Iowa and southeast South Dakota.

== History ==
The Sioux Empire Conference was established on October 20, 1964, with Central Lyon Community School District, Sioux Center Community School District, and West Sioux Community School District of Iowa as founding members, alongside Canton Public Schools and Vermillion Public Schools of South Dakota. Central Lyon and West Sioux left the Siouxland Conference to establish the Sioux Empire Conference, while Canton, Sioux Center, Vermillion were independent schools. Athletic competitions began in 1965, with track and field and baseball. Sports added in the 1965–66 school year included football and basketball. By 1967, the Sioux Empire Conference had disbanded. Sioux Center and Central Lyon returned to the Siouxland Conference, and West Sioux became an independent.
