= Lakes Conference =

Iowa High School athletic conference

- Conference: IHSAA / IGHSAU
- Founded: 1925
- Sports fielded: 18
- No. of teams: 5
- Region: Northwest Iowa
- Website: www.lakesconference.org

The Lakes Conference was an American high school athletic conference whose members were located in mid-sized cities in northwest Iowa. Most of the schools were located in their respective county seats.

School locations in Iowa

== Member schools ==
The conference's last lineup consisted of five schools in northwestern Iowa. Since Iowa is the only state in the nation that maintains separate governing bodies for boys' and girls' athletics, the classifications are different for each gender.

The Iowa High School Athletic Association is divided into classes (from largest to smallest) 4A, 3A, 2A, 1A, A, and 8-player for football while the Iowa Girls High School Athletic Union is divided into classes 1A (smallest schools) to 5A (largest schools).

| Institution | Location | Colors | Affiliation | 2024-2025 BEDS | Mascot | Football class | Girls volleyball class |
|---|---|---|---|---|---|---|---|
| Cherokee, Washington | Cherokee | | Public | 282 | Braves | 2A | 3A |
| Estherville–Lincoln Central | Estherville | | Public | 277 | Midgets | 2A | 3A |
| Spencer | Spencer | | Public | 545 | Tigers | 4A | 4A |
| Spirit Lake | Spirit Lake | | Public | 295 | Indians | 2A | 3A |
| Storm Lake | Storm Lake | | Public | 581 | Tornadoes | 4A | 4A |

== Sports ==
The conference offered the following sports:

- Fall —volleyball, boys' cross-country, girls' cross-country, girls' swimming
- Winter — Boys' basketball, girls basketball, wrestling and boys' swimming.
- Spring — Boys' track and field, girls' track and field, boys' soccer, girls' soccer, boys' tennis, girls' tennis, boys' golf and girls' golf.
- Summer — Baseball and softball.

== History ==
The Lakes Conference dates back to the mid-1940s when Storm Lake, Cherokee, Spirit Lake, Sibley, Sheldon, Emmetsburg, Estherville, and Spencer formed the league. For over four decades, the conference had no membership changes. In the 1980s, Sibley merged with nearby Ocheyedan High School and left the conference in 1990 to join the Siouxland Conference. Estherville also merged with Lincoln Central High School in the mid-1990s to form Estherville–Lincoln Central High School. For the 1993–94 academic year, LeMars was added to the conference lineup.

Hull Western Christian joined the Lakes in 1997–98. Since joining the Lakes, Western Christian has participated in 8 state basketball tournaments and won the 2A championship in 2006–07, becoming the first league school to win the state title since Estherville in 1986–87. They followed this up by repeating as state champs in 2007–08, and winning another title in 2009–10.

The Lakes Conference sponsored football for over 50 years before the Iowa High School Athletic Association realigned all levels of football into a two-year evolving districts format. Because of this change, many of the schools do not compete against each other in football.

Though all the schools currently compete in either classes 2A or 3A, most were once in the highest level of classification for the Iowa High School Athletic Association. With the addition of a fourth class in the 1980s, however, none of the conference schools met the enrollment requirement to be in this largest class. In addition, most of the schools are currently seeing a slight decline in their enrollment. As recently as 5 years ago seven of the league's eight schools were in class 3A, the second highest class in Iowa. Today Storm Lake, and Spencer consistently fall in the top fifteen biggest schools in class 3A while Estherville–Lincoln Central and Spirit Lake often flip between class 2A and class 3A depending on their enrollment for the school year. Cherokee is solidly in class 2A and is not expected to change classes any time soon.

=== Recent conference membership changes ===
In 2009–10, Sheldon left the conference to join the Siouxland Conference. Sheldon officials cited travel distances as the reason for making the jump, as five schools from the Siouxland Conference are closer to Sheldon than the second-closest Lakes Conference school.

In 2017 Emmetsburg, a founding member of the Lakes Conference, left the conference to join the Twin Lakes Conference. Emmetsburg officials cited school size comparisons and a lack of ability to compete successfully in the Lakes Conference as the two main reasons for the switch.

In March 2018, Le Mars Community announced that it would be leaving the Lakes Conference to join the Missouri River Activities Conference. Le Mars officials explained that they chose to leave due to the instability of the Lakes Conference, disparity of the sizes of schools in the Lakes Conference, and a lack of consistent high-caliber competition from top to bottom in the conference on a yearly basis. Le Mars Community participated in Lakes Conference competition for the 2018–19 school year before leaving for the Missouri River Activities Conference for the 2019–20 school year.

Lakes Conference officials have said that they are working to find other schools to bring the conference back up to seven, eight, or even more members. However, until this happens, the conference will temporarily run as a six-school conference. If no school will agree to join the conference after Le Mars's departure, conference officials will meet to discuss future options, including continuing with six teams or disbanding the conference.

On February 15, 2021, Western Christian announced it would be leaving the conference following the 2021-2022 school year. The school noted it was operating as a geographical outlier, and that distance to the other schools was expensive. The school did not specify which conference it would be joining, it did mention that it was interesting in competing more locally. The school has attempted to join the Siouxland Conference, and was denied membership. It will remain independent of conference affiliation for the time being.

On December 17 2024 The Siouxland Conference extended invitations to Cherokee, Estherville–Lincoln Central, Spencer and Storm Lake to join starting with the 2026-27 academic year. The Siouxland Conference officially announced on January 8, 2025 that these schools will officially join the conference on August 1, 2026 along with Spirit Lake and former Lakes Conference member Western Christian to form a 15-school superconference.

== State tournament success ==
The Lakes Conference had a very successful history in the state tournaments for various sports.

=== Football ===
Spencer: State champions: 1994

Spirit Lake: State champions: 2012, 2015

Western Christian: State champions: 2016

=== Volleyball ===
Western Christian

State champions: 1993, 1994, 1995, 1998, 2001, 2002, 2003, 2004, 2006, 2007, 2008, 2010, 2015, 2016

=== Boys basketball ===
Western Christian State championships: 1985, 1991, 1996, 2007, 2008, 2010, 2014, 2016, 2017, 2021

Estherville: State championships: 1987

Storm Lake: State championships: 1968, 1980

=== Girls basketball ===
Six-on-six:

Estherville: State champions: 1982

Five-on-five:

Western Christian: State champions: 2012, 2013, 2014, 2017

Estherville-Lincoln Central: State champions: 2022

=== Boys soccer ===
Spencer: State champions: 2009

=== Baseball ===
Cherokee: State champions: 2007

Spencer: State champions: 1991, 1997

=== Softball ===
Spirit Lake State champions: 2004
