= George Edward Held =

American farmer and politician (1877–1966)

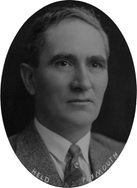
- Held in 1927, at the advent of his third consecutive term in the Iowa General Assembly

Member of the Iowa House of Representatives from the 4th district
- In office January 10, 1921 – January 13, 1929

Personal details
- Born: July 1, 1877 Hinton, Iowa, U.S.
- Died: November 27, 1966 (aged 89) Le Mars, Iowa, U.S.
- Party: Republican
- Spouse: Agnes Ayres (m. 1922)
- Children: 3
- Education: Westmar College
- Occupation: Farmer, politician

George Edward Held (July 1, 1877 — November 27, 1966) was an American farmer and politician who served on the Iowa House of Representatives from 1921 to 1929.

== Background ==
Held was born in Hinton, Iowa, on July 1, 1877, to a German immigrant family. He attended Westmar College, then named "LeMars Normal School," in 1897, and was among the first to graduate.

He would go on to establish his livelihood as concerned with cattle and sheep raising—he would also become an importer of German coach horses.

== Political career ==
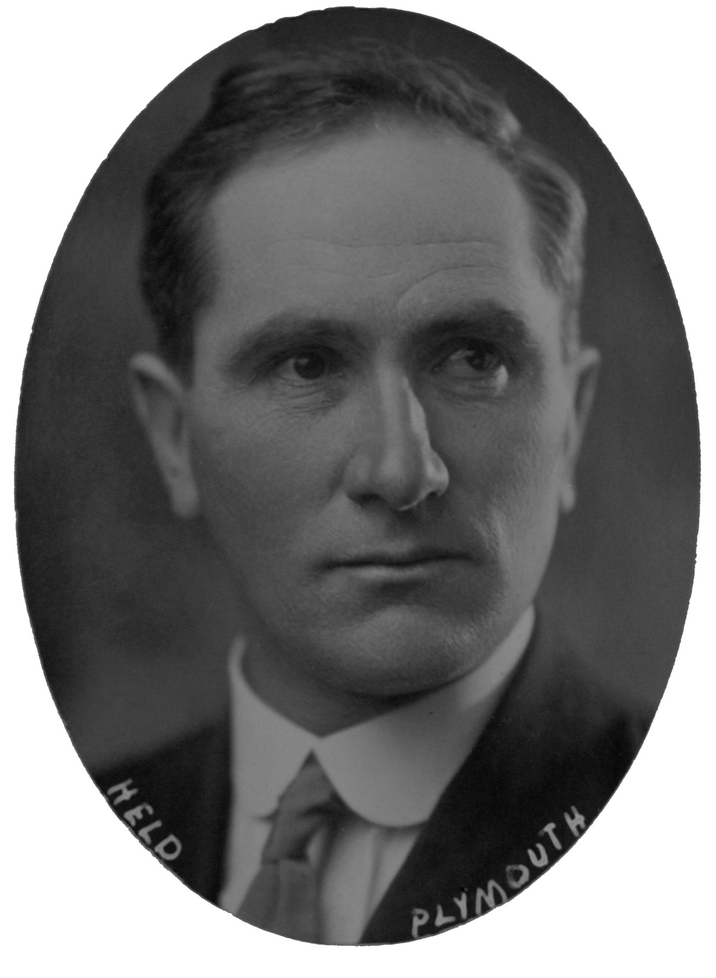
Held, 1921, during his inaugural term in the Legislature

Held first ran for the General Assembly's lower house in 1920 as a Republican, and was subsequently elected into the position. He was consistently reelected for the next two elections, with the streak ending in 1929.

== Personal life ==
On March 8, 1922, Held married Agnes Ayres, and had three children with her: namely Thomas, Stanley, and Katherine.

As far as religious affiliations go, he was a member of the Methodist Church in Hinton.

He died on November 27, 1966, as a result of a "long illness" in a nursing home situated in Le Mars.
