= Sioux Center, Iowa =

- City
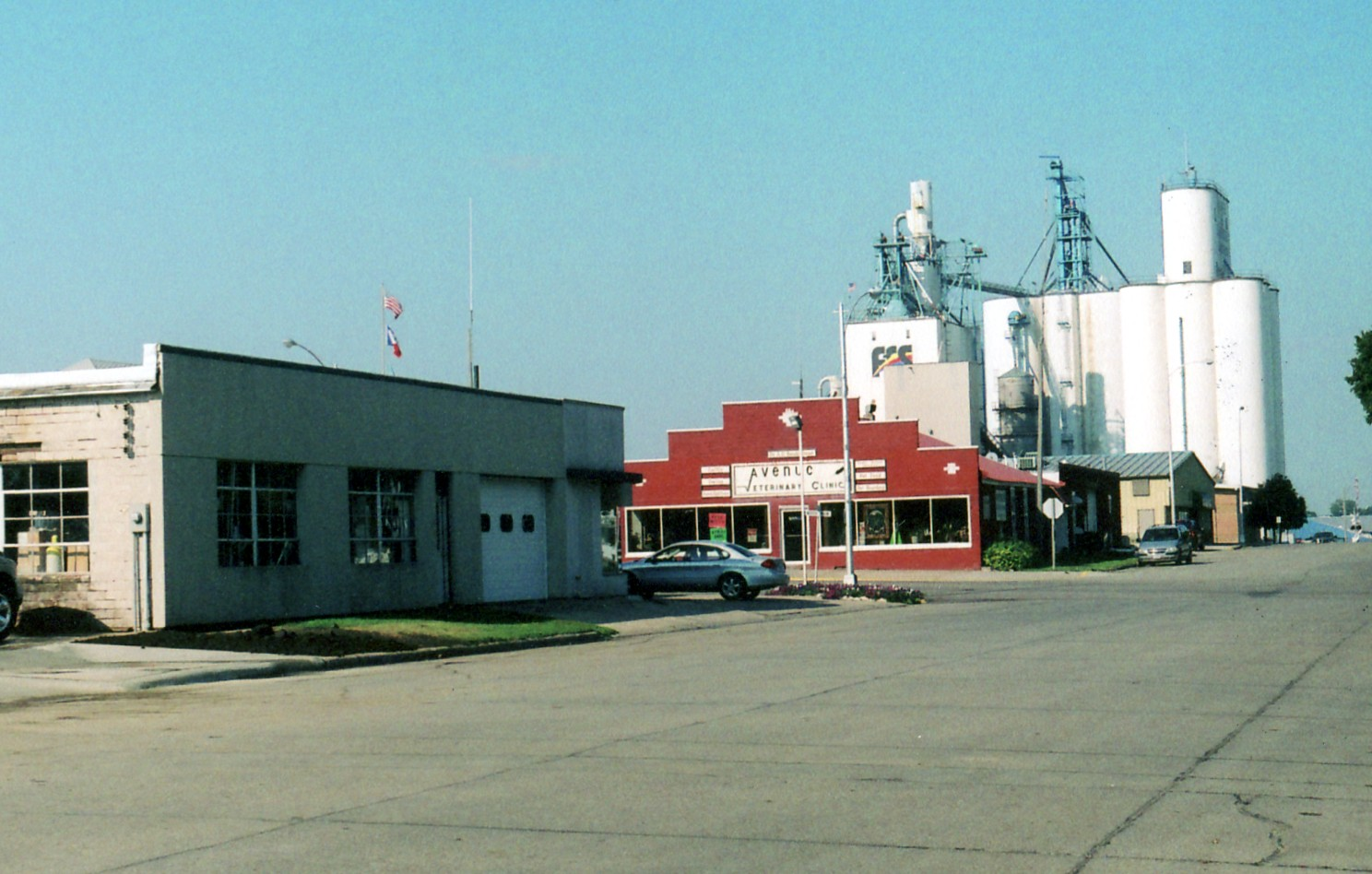
- Grain elevators in Sioux Center
- Motto: Growing Brighter
- Location of Sioux Center, Iowa

- Location in the United States Sioux Center (the United States)
- Coordinates: 43°04′29″N 96°10′13″W
- Country: United States
- State: Iowa
- County: Sioux

Government
  - Type: Mayor-council
  - Mayor: Dale Vander Berg

Area
  - Total: 6.22 sq mi (16.12 km^{2})
  - Land: 6.22 sq mi (16.12 km^{2})
  - Water: 0 sq mi (0.00 km^{2})
- Elevation: 1,427 ft (435 m)

Population (2020)
  - Total: 8,229
  - Density: 1,322.1/sq mi (510.47/km^{2})
- Time zone: UTC-6 (Central (CST))
  - Summer (DST): UTC-5 (CDT)
- ZIP code: 51250
- Area code: 712
- FIPS code: 19-73290
- GNIS feature ID: 2395892
- Website: www.siouxcenter.org

Sioux Center is a city in Sioux County, Iowa. The population was 8,229 at the time of the 2020 census. Sioux Center is notable for its Dutch heritage, agribusiness, and as the location of Dordt University.

== Geography ==
According to the United States Census Bureau, the city had a land area of 6.22 square miles (16.11 km²)

Sioux Center is at an elevation of 1,445 feet (440 m) above sea level. It lies near the north-to-south ridge, or spine, of western Iowa. The eastern side of Sioux Center drains to the Floyd River. The western side drains to the Big Sioux River. The area within a ten-mile (16 km) radius of Sioux Center has been divided into sections of one square mile each. The gravel and paved roads marking the sections do not swerve or contour for the slight hills or valleys.

=== Climate ===
Climate data for Sioux Center 2 SE, Iowa (1991−2020 normals, extremes 1899−present)
Month	Jan	Feb	Mar	Apr	May	Jun	Jul	Aug	Sep	Oct	Nov	Dec	Year
Record high °F (°C)	68 (20)	68 (20)	87 (31)	95 (35)	105 (41)	105 (41)	109 (43)	109 (43)	102 (39)	92 (33)	79 (26)	66 (19)	109 (43)
Mean maximum °F (°C)	47.1 (8.4)	52.5 (11.4)	70.3 (21.3)	83.5 (28.6)	91.1 (32.8)	94.4 (34.7)	93.9 (34.4)	92.3 (33.5)	89.5 (31.9)	84.2 (29.0)	66.6 (19.2)	49.9 (9.9)	96.6 (35.9)
Mean daily maximum °F (°C)	27.4 (−2.6)	32.9 (0.5)	46.3 (7.9)	61.2 (16.2)	73.2 (22.9)	82.4 (28.0)	84.8 (29.3)	82.3 (27.9)	77.1 (25.1)	63.6 (17.6)	45.8 (7.7)	31.5 (−0.3)	59.0 (15.0)
Daily mean °F (°C)	18.4 (−7.6)	23.4 (−4.8)	35.7 (2.1)	48.7 (9.3)	60.8 (16.0)	70.7 (21.5)	73.3 (22.9)	70.9 (21.6)	64.2 (17.9)	51.1 (10.6)	35.6 (2.0)	23.0 (−5.0)	48.0 (8.9)
Mean daily minimum °F (°C)	9.4 (−12.6)	13.9 (−10.1)	25.2 (−3.8)	36.1 (2.3)	48.4 (9.1)	58.9 (14.9)	61.8 (16.6)	59.5 (15.3)	51.2 (10.7)	38.6 (3.7)	25.4 (−3.7)	14.5 (−9.7)	36.9 (2.7)
Mean minimum °F (°C)	−15.9 (−26.6)	−9.0 (−22.8)	1.1 (−17.2)	19.1 (−7.2)	32.7 (0.4)	45.8 (7.7)	49.3 (9.6)	46.2 (7.9)	33.4 (0.8)	19.8 (−6.8)	5.2 (−14.9)	−9.5 (−23.1)	−19.0 (−28.3)
Record low °F (°C)	−37 (−38)	−33 (−36)	−19 (−28)	−1 (−18)	17 (−8)	33 (1)	38 (3)	37 (3)	21 (−6)	−2 (−19)	−20 (−29)	−32 (−36)	−37 (−38)
Average precipitation inches (mm)	0.67 (17)	0.88 (22)	1.72 (44)	2.98 (76)	4.15 (105)	4.51 (115)	3.45 (88)	3.40 (86)	3.21 (82)	2.46 (62)	1.43 (36)	0.99 (25)	29.85 (758)
Average snowfall inches (cm)	6.8 (17)	7.7 (20)	5.6 (14)	3.1 (7.9)	0.1 (0.25)	0.0 (0.0)	0.0 (0.0)	0.0 (0.0)	0.0 (0.0)	0.9 (2.3)	3.9 (9.9)	6.7 (17)	34.8 (88)
Average precipitation days (≥ 0.01 in)	5.1	5.2	6.1	9.4	12.4	10.8	8.3	9.0	7.8	7.6	5.6	5.8	93.1
Average snowy days (≥ 0.1 in)	3.8	3.9	2.6	1.2	0.0	0.0	0.0	0.0	0.0	0.5	2.3	4.1	18.4
Source: NOAA

== Demographics ==
Historical populations
Year	Pop.	±%
1900	810	—
1910	1,064	+31.4%
1920	1,389	+30.5%
1930	1,497	+7.8%
1940	1,680	+12.2%
1950	1,860	+10.7%
1960	2,275	+22.3%
1970	3,450	+51.6%
1980	4,588	+33.0%
1990	5,074	+10.6%
2000	6,002	+18.3%
2010	7,048	+17.4%
2020	8,229	+16.8%
Source:"U.S. Census website". United States Census Bureau. and Iowa Data Center; Source: U.S. Decennial Census

=== 2020 census ===
As of the 2020 census, Sioux Center had a population of 8,229, with 2,495 households and 1,846 families residing in the city. The population density was 1,322.1 inhabitants per square mile (510.5/km^{2}). There were 2,669 housing units at an average density of 428.8 per square mile (165.6/km^{2}).

The median age was 27.4 years. 28.8% of residents were under the age of 18 and 13.9% were 65 years of age or older. For every 100 females, there were 100.6 males, and for every 100 females age 18 and over, there were 98.7 males age 18 and over.

99.9% of residents lived in urban areas, while 0.1% lived in rural areas.

Of the city's households, 39.3% had children under the age of 18. Married-couple households made up 64.2%, while 12.5% had a male householder with no spouse or partner present and 20.4% had a female householder with no spouse or partner present. About 26.0% of households were non-families, 23.0% were one-person households, and 12.0% had someone living alone who was 65 years of age or older.

Of housing units, 6.5% were vacant. The homeowner vacancy rate was 4.1% and the rental vacancy rate was 6.1%.

Racial composition as of the 2020 census
Race	Number	Percent
White	6,464	78.6%
Black or African American	60	0.7%
American Indian and Alaska Native	60	0.7%
Asian	89	1.1%
Native Hawaiian and Other Pacific Islander	0	0.0%
Some other race	810	9.8%
Two or more races	746	9.1%
Hispanic or Latino (of any race)	1,728	21.0%

=== 2010 census ===
As of the census of 2010, there were 7,048 people, 2,201 households, and 1,598 families residing in the city. The population density was 1,117.0 inhabitants per square mile (431.3/km^{2}). There were 2,306 housing units at an average density of 365.5 per square mile (141.1/km^{2}). The racial makeup of the city was 91.6% White, 0.4% African American, 0.3% Native American, 1.2% Asian, 5.4% from other races, and 1.0% from two or more races. Hispanic or Latino of any race were 13.1% of the population.

There were 2,201 households, of which 35.2% had children under the age of 18 living with them, 64.4% were married couples living together, 5.5% had a female householder with no husband present, 2.7% had a male householder with no wife present, and 27.4% were non-families. 23.9% of all households were made up of individuals, and 12.6% had someone living alone who was 65 years of age or older. The average household size was 2.70 and the average family size was 3.18.

The median age in the city was 27.7 years. 24.4% of residents were under the age of 18; 22.3% were between the ages of 18 and 24; 21.6% were from 25 to 44; 18.8% were from 45 to 64; and 13% were 65 years of age or older. The gender makeup of the city was 49.4% male and 50.6% female.

=== 2000 census ===
As of the census of 2000, there were 6,002 people, 1,831 households, and 1,351 families residing in the city. The population density was 1,134.9 inhabitants per square mile (438.2/km^{2}). There were 1,933 housing units at an average density of 365.5 per square mile (141.1/km^{2}). The racial makeup of the city was 96.58% White, 0.15% African American, 0.10% Native American, 0.85% Asian, 0.03% Pacific Islander, 1.62% from other races, and 0.67% from two or more races. Hispanic or Latino of any race were 4.67% of the population, but this population continues to grow.

There were 1,831 households, out of which 33.9% had children under the age of 18 living with them, 68.0% were married couples living together, 4.8% had a female householder with no husband present, and 26.2% were non-families. 23.1% of all households were made up of individuals, and 12.4% had someone living alone who was 65 years of age or older. The average household size was 2.63 and the average family size was 3.10.

Age spread: 22.3% under the age of 18, 27.1% from 18 to 24, 20.7% from 25 to 44, 15.4% from 45 to 64, and 14.5% who were 65 years of age or older. The median age was 26 years. For every 100 females, there were 92.1 males. For every 100 females age 18 and over, there were 89.1 males.

The median income for a household in the city was $42,775, and the median income for a family was $51,039. Males had a median income of $35,821 versus $20,025 for females. The per capita income for the city was $16,912. About 4.9% of families and 7.1% of the population were below the poverty line, including 8.2% of those under age 18 and 5.8% of those age 65 or over.

In 2000, 66.66% of Sioux Center residents identified as being of Dutch heritage. This was the largest percentage of Dutch Americans of any place in the country.

== Economy ==
Sioux Center commerce, like many smaller towns in northwest Iowa, is dominated by agribusiness. Farmland near Sioux Center sold for a record $27,750 per acre in March 2024. The quality of the farmland and its ability to produce high yields of corn and soybeans is the primary natural resource that propels the economy. Many of the larger employers in the area supply support materials to grain and animal production, process the results of grain and animal production, or provide services to the people involved in agricultural supply, production, and processing. Most of the tallest and the largest structures in town are grain storage facilities.

Other major local employers include the Interstates Companies, which specialize in the design and installation of electrical systems for industrial and commercial projects, and Pella, which manufactures windows and employs approximately 400 people in the local plant.

Sioux Center continues to have freight rail service. The BNSF Railway's main line runs parallel to U.S. Highway 75 through Sioux Center. There are several rail spurs and a BNSF equipment station. Grain is the main rail transported commodity.

== Notable people ==
- Vern Den Herder, player on the undefeated Miami Dolphins NFL team of 1972
- Nancy Meendering Metcalf, American indoor volleyball player
- Dennis Muilenburg, former president, chairman, and CEO of Boeing
- Eldon Mulder, former member of the Alaska House of Representatives
- Christian Rozeboom, NFL player
- Ko Kieft, NFL player
- Delwin Vriend, whose civil rights case Vriend v. Alberta established sexual orientation as a protected human right in Canada

== Attractions and events ==
In 2012, Sioux Center was the first stop of RAGBRAI XL (Register's Annual Great Bicycle Ride Across Iowa). Sioux Center has hosted RAGBRAI on 3 other occasions: 1990, 1996, and 2002. The Sioux County Youth Fair is held every year for about one week in the middle of July. The fair is mainly focused on agriculture, but there are also live events like musical performances and various activities for kids.

Early in June the city hosts "Summer Celebration" which features a town theater production, car show, and cruise night as well as other miscellaneous events. The "pork feeders" host an annual picnic in the central park. The "Siouxperman Triathlon," inaugurated in 2007, is held annually in early May and the "Harvest Half Marathon & 10K" is held annually in early October.

Sioux Center has several entertainment options. The All Seasons Center, which includes the Siouxnami Waterpark and indoor aquatic center, an ice skating arena, and spaces available for rent, is a mixed-use facility open to local residents and students of Dordt University. The university's Campus Center has a bowling alley and recreation center.

== Religion ==
Sioux Center's strongly Dutch heritage is also largely a Reformed (Calvinistic) Protestant heritage. Sioux Center has five Christian Reformed churches, four Reformed Church in America churches, one United Reformed church, and one Netherlands Reformed Church. There is also an Evangelical Free Church, one Lutheran Congregations in Mission for Christ church, and one ELCA church. A Roman Catholic parish is part of a cluster of two other parishes in nearby towns, all served by a single priest within the Diocese of Sioux City. Sioux Center is also home to Amistad Christiana, which is a Spanish-speaking congregation affiliated with the CRC and the RCA.

== Culture ==
Sioux Center is home to the Northwest Iowa Symphony Orchestra. Their concert hall is the Dordt University chapel known as the B.J. Haan Auditorium. The orchestra is composed mostly of volunteers from the NW corner of Iowa. Some of the principals are paid positions. The orchestra also offers scholarships and opportunities for developing musicians from the local schools and colleges.

== Education ==
=== Schools ===
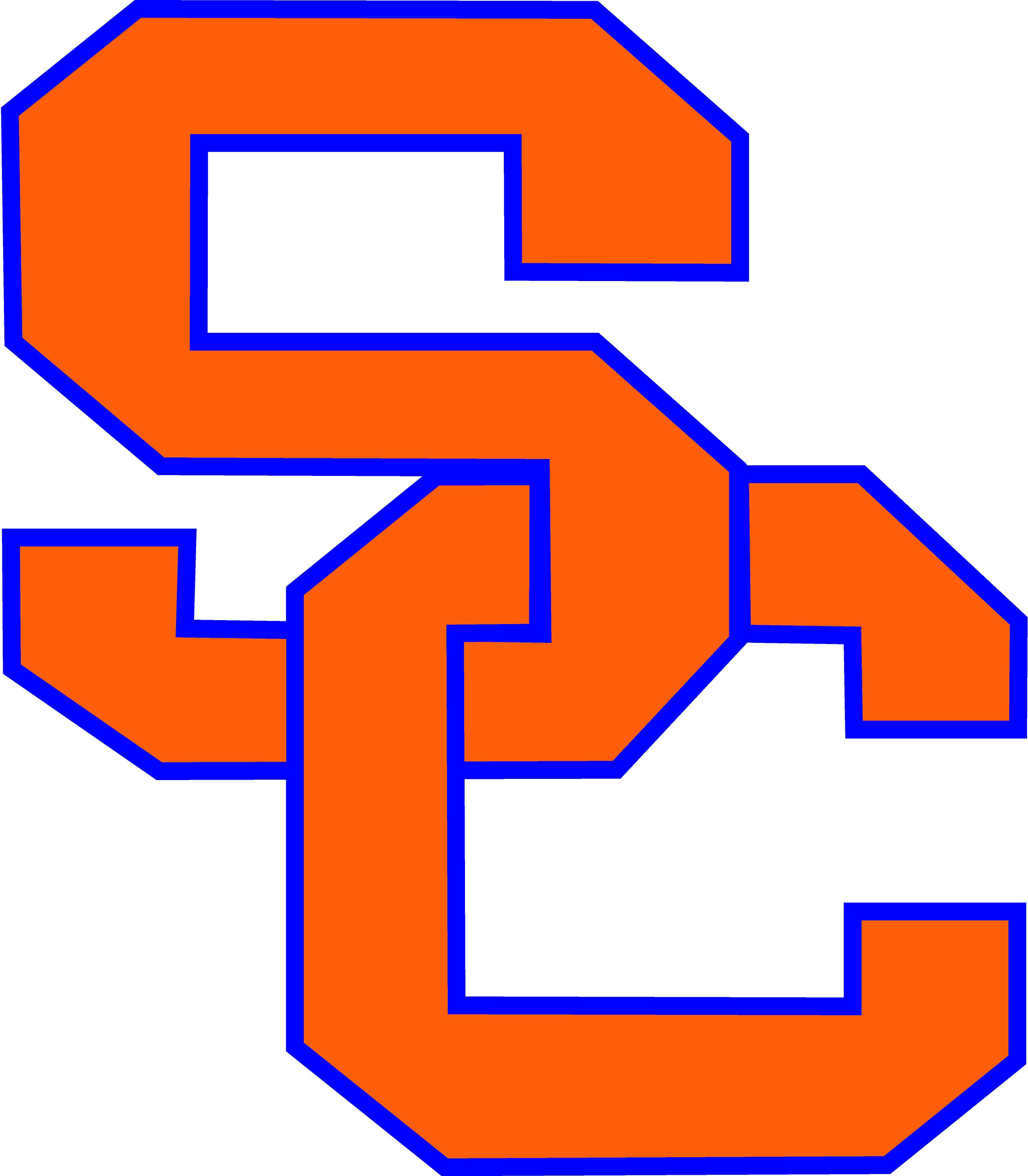
Sioux Center community schools logo

Sioux Center is the home of Dordt University, formerly known as Dordt College. Dordt's 1,500 students are drawn from the local area, Christian Reformed and Reformed communities across the United States and Canada, and other locations throughout the United States and worldwide. Dordt's engineering, education, and agriculture programs are especially popular with students.

The Sioux Center Community School district educates 1,730 students as of October 2024. The school is one of the few non-consolidated schools in northwest Iowa. The kindergarten through 4th grade Kinsey Elementary School posted an all-time high enrollment of 477 in the fall of 2024. 596 students are enrolled in the intermediate & middle schools, and 502 are at the high school. The elementary building and the middle school completed construction projects in 2010.

Sioux Center Christian School educates approximately 538 students grades pre-K through 8th. Most students who graduate from Sioux Center Christian continue to either Western Christian High School in Hull, Iowa or Unity Christian High School in Orange City, Iowa, although some go to the Sioux Center High School for their high school education.

The sports teams of Dordt University and Sioux Center Community Schools enjoy a friendly, yet heated, rivalry with the teams of Orange City. Dordt University and Northwestern College compete in a number of sports, including soccer, volleyball and basketball. Dordt University recently started a football program, fielding a Junior Varsity team in the fall of 2007 and a Varsity team in 2008. MOC-Floyd Valley Community School competes spiritedly with Sioux Center Community School in many school activities. Sioux Center is a mid-sized 3A school.

=== Library ===
The Sioux Center Public Library began in 1927. Its location changed many times over the years due to expanding demand and resource materials. In 1967, the library opened in a new location one block Southeast of the Centre Mall. On July 23, 2003, a fire started due to arson and destroyed the library and $600,000 worth of materials in it. The library was moved to the community center while plans were drawn up for construction of a new building. Completed in September 2008, the Sioux Center Library's new location opened the door to many services – private meeting rooms, an art gallery, and many computers available for public use.

== Organizations ==
=== Boy Scouts of America ===
Scouting began in Sioux Center back in 1923. The Sioux Center troop was charted as Troop 1 with Sioux City Area Council. After a number of years, Troop 1 was discontinued until 1935. Under the same council, Troop 94 was chartered by the American Legion Post #199. The Troop has continued since 1935. In 1943, the Sioux City Area Council transferred the troop to the Prairie Gold Area Council located in Fort Dodge, Iowa. At that time, Troop 94 was redesignated as Troop 211. The troop has had over 75 Scouts reach the rank of Eagle Scout in its history.

=== Sioux Center Wreaths Across America ===
The tradition of laying wreaths to honor veterans during the holiday season began in 1992, when Morrill Worcester of Worcester Wreath Company (Harrington, Maine) was stuck with a number of extra wreaths at the close of the holiday season. Remembering a boyhood trip to Arlington National Cemetery, he donated 5,000 wreaths to be placed at the headstones of an older section of the cemetery. Worcester's action grew into a national movement. In 2006, Wreaths Across America was formed as a non-profit. Every year on a Saturday in December, more than 1,000 locations participate by laying wreaths out of remembrance and respect for America's servicemen and women. Each wreath is sponsored by individuals, organizations, or businesses. Each sponsorship lays one wreath in Memory Gardens.
