= Tyler Starr =

American football player (born 1991)

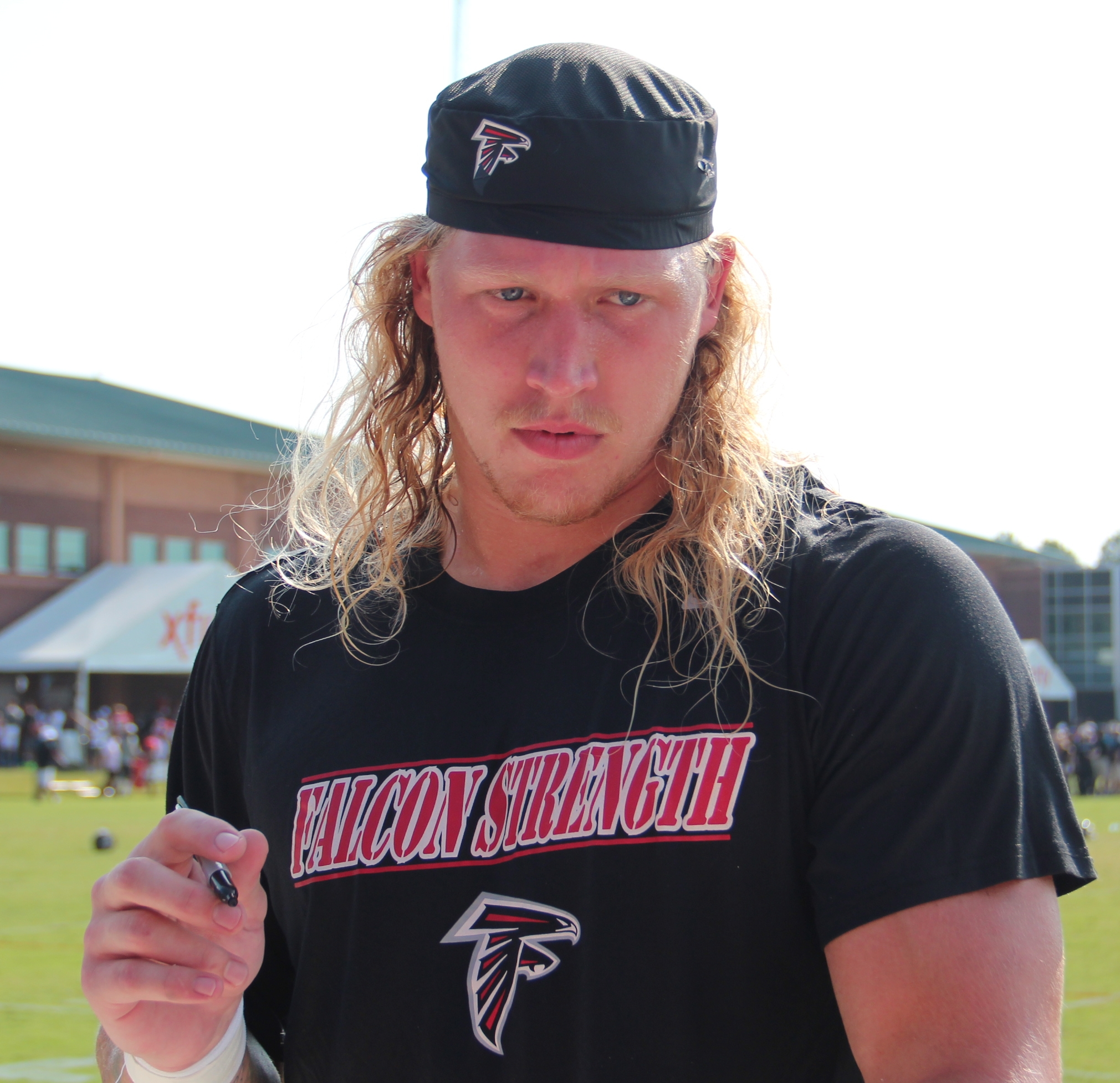
- Starr with the Atlanta Falcons in 2014

No. 41
- Position: Linebacker

Personal information
- Born: January 25, 1991 (age 35); Little Rock, Iowa, U.S.
- Listed height: 6 ft 5 in (1.96 m)
- Listed weight: 250 lb (113 kg)

Career information
- High school: George (IA) George–Little Rock
- College: South Dakota
- NFL draft: 2014: 7th round, 255th overall pick

Career history
- Atlanta Falcons (2014–2016)
- Stats at Pro Football Reference

Tyler Starr (born January 25, 1991) is an American former professional football player who was a linebacker for the Atlanta Falcons of the National Football League (NFL). He played college football for the South Dakota Coyotes. He was selected by the Falcons in the seventh round (255th overall) of the 2014 NFL draft.

== College career ==
Starr played college football for three years at the University of South Dakota.

== Professional career ==
Pre-draft measurables
Height	Weight	Arm length	Hand span	40-yard dash	20-yard shuttle	Three-cone drill	Vertical jump	Broad jump	Bench press
6 ft 4 1/8 in (1.93 m)	250 lb (113 kg)	32 1/2 in (0.83 m)	9 1/2 in (0.24 m)	4.95 s	4.15 s	6.64 s	32.0 in (0.81 m)	9 ft 8 in (2.95 m)	24 reps
All values from NFL Combine

Starr's journey to make the Falcons' 53-man roster was chronicled in the Hard Knocks documentary. On August 30, 2014, Starr made the 53-man roster for the Atlanta Falcons, but did not see any game action. On September 5, 2015, Starr was waived by the Falcons in the final cuts before the start of the regular season. On September 7, 2015, he was signed to the Falcons' practice squad. On December 18. 2015, Starr was promoted to the Falcons' 53-man roster. He played in one game for the Falcons in 2015.

On September 3, 2016, Starr was waived/injured by the Falcons and placed on injured reserve.

Starr participated in The Spring League in 2017.
