= Vern Den Herder =

American football player (born 1948)

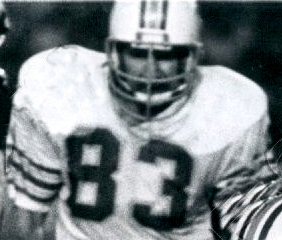
- Den Herder with the Miami Dolphins in 1979

No. 86, 83
- Position: Defensive end

Personal information
- Born: November 28, 1948 (age 77); Le Mars, Iowa, U.S.
- Listed height: 6 ft 6 in (1.98 m)
- Listed weight: 250 lb (113 kg)

Career information
- High school: Sioux Center (IA)
- College: Central (IA)
- NFL draft: 1971: 9th round, 230th overall pick

Career history
- Miami Dolphins (1971–1982)

Awards and highlights
- 2× Super Bowl champion (VII, VIII); Little All-American (1970)

Career NFL statistics
- Sacks: 65
- Fumble recoveries: 14
- Interceptions: 1
- Stats at Pro Football Reference
- College Football Hall of Fame

Vern Wayne Den Herder (born November 28, 1948) is an American former professional football player who was a defensive end for 12 seasons with the Miami Dolphins of the National Football League (NFL). He played in three Super Bowls for the Dolphins. He played college football for the Central College Dutch. In 1996, he was selected to the College Football Hall of Fame.

== Early life ==
Den Herder attended high school in Sioux Center, Iowa. There was no football team his first two years but he was a star in his junior and senior seasons. He was a star in basketball and added football his last two years.

== College career ==
Den Herder chose Central College in Pella, Iowa, because of its reputation for education in sciences and its affiliation with the Reformed Church in America. He was graduated cum laude with a major in chemistry. At 6 feet 6 inches (198 cm) in height, he was the starting center on Central's basketball team for four years and set the school scoring record. He played defensive end in football. CBS anchorman Harry Smith was a teammate.

Den Herder made All-Iowa Conference in 1968, 1969, and 1970. In 1970, his senior season, he was team captain, Iowa Conference MVP, and was named All-America, college division, by the NAIA, the Football Coaches Association, and the Associated Press. Furthermore, he was coached by the late Ron Schipper, himself a College Football Hall of Famer, at Central Iowa.

== Professional career ==
"When I'm watching the games on Sunday, it's nice to be able to think, 'I was good enough. I played in that league.' I left the game with a good taste in my mouth. I played as long as I could have, and I was able to leave when I wanted to."
— Vern Den Herder reflecting on his NFL career.

As the NFL did not officially maintain sack records until 1982, he unofficially led the Dolphins in sacks in 1972 with 10 1/2; Den Herder also unofficially led the team in 1975 with a career high 11 sacks. He was named All-AFC in 1972. In October 1973, he unofficially tied Bill Stanfill for most sacks in a single game with 5, as Stanfill had recently surpassed the previous total just two weeks earlier. Also, he unofficially led the Dolphins in sacks during the 1978 and 1979 seasons with 9. His unofficial total of 64 1/2 sacks ranks fourth on the Dolphins sack list. In addition to his five-sack game in 1973, Den Herder recorded two four-sack games (September 22, 1974, at Buffalo Bills) and (November 11, 1979, vs. Baltimore Colts). He was voted by the NEA as the Dolphins MVP in 1979.

Coach Don Shula called him "one of the most dependable players I've ever coached."

== Retirement and post-football career ==
Seeing that the game had evolved toward more passing-oriented strategies that were not attuned to his run-stopping ability, Den Herder originally decided to retire in 1981, returning to his hometown to work in a cattle feeding operation. However, Coach Shula asked him to return to the game for one more season after the Dolphins roster had thinned due to injuries. He ended his career after playing in Super Bowl XVII.

After retiring from football for the second time, Den Herder returned to Sioux Center, Iowa and became a farmer, now specializing in corn and soybeans. He is married and the father of two children. Due to a harvest, he was unable to join the rest of the 1972 Perfect Season Dolphins at a ceremony in their honor, hosted by President Barack Obama at the White House.
