= Little Rock, Iowa =

- City
- Location of Little Rock, Iowa
- Coordinates: 43°26′49″N 95°52′36″W
- Country: USA
- State: Iowa
- County: Lyon

Government
  - Type: Mayor-council

Area
  - Total: 1.02 sq mi (2.63 km^{2})
  - Land: 1.02 sq mi (2.63 km^{2})
  - Water: 0 sq mi (0.00 km^{2})
- Elevation: 1,460 ft (450 m)

Population (2020)
  - Total: 439
  - Density: 432.5/sq mi (166.98/km^{2})
- Time zone: UTC-6 (Central (CST))
  - Summer (DST): UTC-5 (CDT)
- ZIP code: 51243
- Area code: 712
- FIPS code: 19-45795
- GNIS feature ID: 2395736
- Website: littlerockia.com

Little Rock is a city in Lyon County, Iowa, United States, along the Little Rock River. The population was 439 at the time of the 2020 census. The zip code for Little Rock is 51243.

== Geography ==
According to the United States Census Bureau, the city has a total area of 0.80 square miles (2.07 km^{2}), all land.

== Demographics ==
Historical populations
Year	Pop.	±%
1900	399	—
1910	471	+18.0%
1920	573	+21.7%
1930	585	+2.1%
1940	633	+8.2%
1950	533	−15.8%
1960	564	+5.8%
1970	531	−5.9%
1980	490	−7.7%
1990	493	+0.6%
2000	489	−0.8%
2010	459	−6.1%
2020	439	−4.4%
Source:"U.S. Census website". United States Census Bureau. and Iowa Data Center; Source: U.S. Decennial Census

=== 2020 census ===
As of the census of 2020, there were 439 people, 194 households, and 129 families residing in the city. The population density was 432.5 inhabitants per square mile (167.0/km^{2}). There were 213 housing units at an average density of 209.8 per square mile (81.0/km^{2}). The racial makeup of the city was 92.0% White, 0.5% Black or African American, 0.2% Native American, 0.0% Asian, 0.5% Pacific Islander, 3.6% from other races and 3.2% from two or more races. Hispanic or Latino persons of any race comprised 7.3% of the population.

Of the 194 households, 27.8% of which had children under the age of 18 living with them, 51.5% were married couples living together, 4.6% were cohabitating couples, 29.9% had a female householder with no spouse or partner present and 13.9% had a male householder with no spouse or partner present. 33.5% of all households were non-families. 28.9% of all households were made up of individuals, 18.0% had someone living alone who was 65 years old or older.

The median age in the city was 42.3 years. 24.1% of the residents were under the age of 20; 7.5% were between the ages of 20 and 24; 22.3% were from 25 and 44; 22.3% were from 45 and 64; and 23.7% were 65 years of age or older. The gender makeup of the city was 48.5% male and 51.5% female.

=== 2010 census ===
As of the census of 2010, there were 459 people, 195 households, and 129 families living in the city. The population density was 573.8 inhabitants per square mile (221.5/km^{2}). There were 221 housing units at an average density of 276.3 per square mile (106.7/km^{2}). The racial makeup of the city was 99.8% White and 0.2% from other races. Hispanic or Latino of any race were 0.7% of the population.

There were 195 households, of which 27.2% had children under the age of 18 living with them, 56.9% were married couples living together, 7.2% had a female householder with no husband present, 2.1% had a male householder with no wife present, and 33.8% were non-families. 31.3% of all households were made up of individuals, and 15.4% had someone living alone who was 65 years of age or older. The average household size was 2.35 and the average family size was 2.95.

The median age in the city was 41.8 years. 24.6% of residents were under the age of 18; 7.7% were between the ages of 18 and 24; 22.3% were from 25 to 44; 23.9% were from 45 to 64; and 21.6% were 65 years of age or older. The gender makeup of the city was 48.4% male and 51.6% female.

=== 2000 census ===
As of the census of 2000, there were 489 people, 208 households, and 133 families living in the city. The population density was 627.9 inhabitants per square mile (242.4/km^{2}). There were 232 housing units at an average density of 297.9 per square mile (115.0/km^{2}). The racial makeup of the city was 99.59% White and 0.41% Asian.

There were 208 households, out of which 23.1% had children under the age of 18 living with them, 60.1% were married couples living together, 2.4% had a female householder with no husband present, and 35.6% were non-families. 31.7% of all households were made up of individuals, and 22.6% had someone living alone who was 65 years of age or older. The average household size was 2.35 and the average family size was 2.98.

24.3% were under the age of 18, 6.3% from 18 to 24, 21.1% from 25 to 44, 22.3% from 45 to 64, and 26.0% were 65 years of age or older. The median age was 43 years. For every 100 females, there were 87.4 males. For every 100 females age 18 and over, there were 85.0 males.

The median income for a household in the city was $31,667, and the median income for a family was $38,571. Males had a median income of $26,000 versus $18,750 for females. The per capita income for the city was $15,514. About 4.3% of families and 9.6% of the population were below the poverty line, including 13.3% of those under age 18 and 10.8% of those age 65 or over.

== Education ==
The community is served by the George–Little Rock Community School District, formed on July 1, 1990, by the merger of the George and Little Rock school districts. George–Little Rock Senior High School is the district's high school.

== Events ==
Little Rock is home to the Corn Show, an annual fair which runs for a weekend in august. The fair includes many events such as a Miss Little Rock and Little Miss Little Rock Competition, a Corn Show Button Contest, golf ball roll, car show, parade and carnival rides.

== Notable person ==
- Tyler Starr - linebacker, for the Atlanta Falcons
