= Constance Congdon =

American playwright and librettist

- Born: Rock Rapids, Iowa, United States
- Education: University of Massachusetts Amherst
- Relatives: Father - Ned Congdon
- Writing career
- Notable works: Tales of the Lost Formicans; No Mercy; One Day Earlier; Casanova; Facing Forward; Dog Opera; Losing Father's Body; Lips; Native American; A Mother; Moontel Six; The Automata Pietà
- Notable awards: Guggenheim Fellowship; Lilly Award; Legacy Playwrights Initiative Award; Arnold Weissberger Award; Berilla Kerr Award; The Helen Merrill Award

Constance S. Congdon (born 1944) is an American playwright and librettist. She has won grants and awards from the National Endowment for the Arts, the W. Alton Jones Foundation, and the Guggenheim Foundation, and is the recipient of a 2019 Lilly Award, which recognizes extraordinary women in theatre. In 2021 she was honored with the Legacy Playwrights Initiative Award by the Dramatists Guild Foundation, for her sustained achievement, enduring excellence and influence on the American theater. Congdon was described by Tony Kushner as "one of the best playwrights our country, and our language, has produced."

Her first play had 30 scenes and 57 characters, and her 2001 play Casanova covered 73 years in 19 scenes set between Paris and Venice.

Her most well-known plays and adaptations include: Tales of the Lost Formicans, Casanova, Lips, Losing Father's Body, The Misanthrope, A Mother, No Mercy, The Servant of Two Masters, Tartuffe and Paradise Street. She has written a number of opera libretti and seven plays for the Children's Theatre Company of Minneapolis. Her playwriting career includes an adaptation of Maxim Gorky's A Mother with Olympia Dukakis in the lead role.

Congdon was born in Rock Rapids, Iowa. Her first play, Gilgamesh, was produced in 1977. Congdon received her M.F.A. from the University of Massachusetts Amherst in 1982. She taught playwriting at Amherst College from 1993 to 2018 as its Playwright-in-Residence.
