= Eldon Mulder =

American lobbyist and politician

Member of the Alaska House of Representatives from the 23rd district
- In office January 1993 – January 2003
- Preceded by: Richard Foster (redistricted)
- Succeeded by: Les Gara

Personal details
- Born: August 28, 1957 (age 68) Sioux Center, Iowa, US
- Party: Republican
- Education: Central College (BA); University of Colorado Boulder (MA)
- Occupation: Lobbyist

Eldon Mulder (born August 28, 1957) is a lobbyist and former politician who represented the 23rd district in the Alaska House of Representatives between 1993 and 2003.

== Early life and education ==
Mulder was born in Sioux Center, Iowa and grew up on a farm there. He graduated from Sioux Center High School in 1976, going on to obtain a bachelor's degree in political science from Central College in 1980 and a master's degree from University of Colorado Boulder in 1982.

== Political career ==
Mulder was elected to the Alaska House in 1992, representing Anchorage. During his time in the legislature, most of his work was focused on state finances. He served as co-chair of the Finance Committee and was a member of numerous finance subcommittees.

In May 2002, Mulder announced that he would not seek reelection, citing a desire to spend more time with his family.

== Later career ==
After leaving the House, Mulder founded a lobbying firm—the Mulder Company. Mulder's clients have included the Pebble Partnership and GCI.

== Personal life ==
Mulder was formerly married to fellow lobbyist Wendy Chamberlain. He has two daughters. He is currently married to Corina Mulder.

In August 2018, Mulder received some attention in the media and online for rescuing a porcupine stranded on a rock in the Kenai River.
