= Ko Kieft =

American football player (born 1998)

- Kieft with the Tampa Bay Buccaneers in 2026

No. 41 – Tampa Bay Buccaneers
- Position: Tight end
- Roster status: Active

Personal information
- Born: January 20, 1998 (age 28); Sioux Center, Iowa, U.S.
- Listed height: 6 ft 5 in (1.96 m)
- Listed weight: 265 lb (120 kg)

Career information
- High school: Sioux Center (IA)
- College: Minnesota (2016–2021)
- NFL draft: 2022: 6th round, 218th overall pick

Career history
- Tampa Bay Buccaneers (2022–present)

Career NFL statistics as of Week 7, 2026
- Receptions: 8
- Receiving yards: 82
- Receiving touchdowns: 2
- Total tackles: 26
- Stats at Pro Football Reference

Ko Jason Kieft (born January 20, 1998) is an American professional football tight end for the Tampa Bay Buccaneers of the National Football League (NFL). He played college football for the Minnesota Golden Gophers.

== Professional career ==
Pre-draft measurables
Height	Weight	Arm length	Hand span	Wingspan	40-yard dash	10-yard split	20-yard split	20-yard shuttle	Three-cone drill	Vertical jump	Broad jump	Bench press
6 ft 4 3/8 in (1.94 m)	259 lb (117 kg)	33 in (0.84 m)	9 1/2 in (0.24 m)	6 ft 7 3/4 in (2.03 m)	4.98 s	1.80 s	2.89 s	4.53 s	7.07 s	32.0 in (0.81 m)	9 ft 3 in (2.82 m)	21 reps
All values from Pro Day

Kieft was selected by the Tampa Bay Buccaneers in the sixth round, 218th overall, in the 2022 NFL draft. In Week 4 against the Kansas City Chiefs, Kieft recorded a 19–yard gain on a pass from Tom Brady for his first career reception. As a rookie, he had seven receptions for 80 yards and a touchdown; he appeared in 17 games and started 12. In the 2023 season, Kieft appeared in 16 games and started six. He had a receiving touchdown against the Green Bay Packers in Week 15. In the 2024 season, Kieft appeared in all 17 games and started one. A majority of his production came on special teams.

Kieft began the 2025 season as one of Tampa Bay's reserve tight ends. He suffered a leg injury in Week 3 against the New York Jets, and was placed on season-ending injured reserve on September 23, 2025.

On March 13, 2026, Kieft re-signed with the Buccaneers on a one-year, $1.65 million contract.

== Personal life ==
Kieft's first name is his legal name, not a nickname. “Ko” is a derivative of “Jakobus,” the name of a great-grandfather who immigrated to the United States from the Netherlands.
