= Larrabee, Iowa =

- City
- Location of Larrabee, Iowa
- Coordinates: 42°51′41″N 95°32′41″W
- Country: USA
- State: Iowa
- County: Cherokee

Area
  - Total: 0.13 sq mi (0.34 km^{2})
  - Land: 0.13 sq mi (0.34 km^{2})
  - Water: 0 sq mi (0.00 km^{2})
- Elevation: 1,371 ft (418 m)

Population (2020)
  - Total: 123
  - Density: 944.5/sq mi (364.66/km^{2})
- Time zone: UTC-6 (Central (CST))
  - Summer (DST): UTC-5 (CDT)
- ZIP code: 51029
- Area code: 712
- FIPS code: 19-43500
- GNIS feature ID: 2395635

Larrabee is a city in Cherokee County, Iowa, United States. The population was 123 at the time of the 2020 census.

== History ==
A post office called Larrabee has been in operation since 1877. The city was named after William Larrabee, the 13th Governor of Iowa.

== Geography ==
According to the United States Census Bureau, the city has a total area of 0.12 square miles (0.31 km^{2}), all land.

== Demographics ==
Historical population
Census	Pop.	Note	%±
1900	125		—
1910	158		26.4%
1920	206		30.4%
1930	189		−8.3%
1940	189		0.0%
1950	158		−16.4%
1960	167		5.7%
1970	167		0.0%
1980	169		1.2%
1990	175		3.6%
2000	149		−14.9%
2010	132		−11.4%
2020	123		−6.8%
U.S. Decennial Census

=== 2020 census ===
As of the census of 2020, there were 123 people, 59 households, and 41 families residing in the city. The population density was 944.5 inhabitants per square mile (364.7/km^{2}). There were 67 housing units at an average density of 514.5 per square mile (198.6/km^{2}). The racial makeup of the city was 92.7% White, 0.8% Black or African American, 0.0% Native American, 1.6% Asian, 0.0% Pacific Islander, 0.8% from other races and 4.1% from two or more races. Hispanic or Latino persons of any race comprised 4.1% of the population.

Of the 59 households, 16.9% of which had children under the age of 18 living with them, 42.4% were married couples living together, 15.3% were cohabitating couples, 20.3% had a female householder with no spouse or partner present and 22.0% had a male householder with no spouse or partner present. 30.5% of all households were non-families. 22.0% of all households were made up of individuals, 5.1% had someone living alone who was 65 years old or older.

The median age in the city was 53.6 years. 13.8% of the residents were under the age of 20; 0.8% were between the ages of 20 and 24; 25.2% were from 25 and 44; 28.5% were from 45 and 64; and 31.7% were 65 years of age or older. The gender makeup of the city was 48.0% male and 52.0% female.

=== 2010 census ===
As of the census of 2010, there were 132 people, 62 households, and 38 families living in the city. The population density was 1,100.0 inhabitants per square mile (424.7/km^{2}). There were 71 housing units at an average density of 591.7 per square mile (228.5/km^{2}). The racial makeup of the city was 97.7% White and 2.3% African American. Hispanic or Latino of any race were 4.5% of the population.

There were 62 households, of which 24.2% had children under the age of 18 living with them, 38.7% were married couples living together, 14.5% had a female householder with no husband present, 8.1% had a male householder with no wife present, and 38.7% were non-families. 33.9% of all households were made up of individuals, and 11.3% had someone living alone who was 65 years of age or older. The average household size was 2.13 and the average family size was 2.58.

The median age in the city was 45.5 years. 20.5% of residents were under the age of 18; 10.6% were between the ages of 18 and 24; 19% were from 25 to 44; 35.6% were from 45 to 64; and 14.4% were 65 years of age or older. The gender makeup of the city was 50.0% male and 50.0% female.

=== 2000 census ===
As of the census of 2000, there were 149 people, 73 households, and 42 families living in the city. The population density was 1,169.2 inhabitants per square mile (451.4/km^{2}). There were 79 housing units at an average density of 619.9 per square mile (239.3/km^{2}). The racial makeup of the city was 100.00% White.

There were 73 households, out of which 23.3% had children under the age of 18 living with them, 41.1% were married couples living together, 12.3% had a female householder with no husband present, and 41.1% were non-families. 38.4% of all households were made up of individuals, and 16.4% had someone living alone who was 65 years of age or older. The average household size was 2.04 and the average family size was 2.56.

In the city, the population was spread out, with 22.1% under the age of 18, 6.0% from 18 to 24, 26.2% from 25 to 44, 26.8% from 45 to 64, and 18.8% who were 65 years of age or older. The median age was 42 years. For every 100 females, there were 91.0 males. For every 100 females age 18 and over, there were 100.0 males.

The median income for a household in the city was $22,500, and the median income for a family was $23,438. Males had a median income of $35,000 versus $19,688 for females. The per capita income for the city was $13,306. There were 3.4% of families and 3.2% of the population living below the poverty line, including no under eighteens and 11.5% of those over 64.

== Education ==
The Cherokee Community School District operates local schools.
