= Les Gara =

American politician (born 1963)

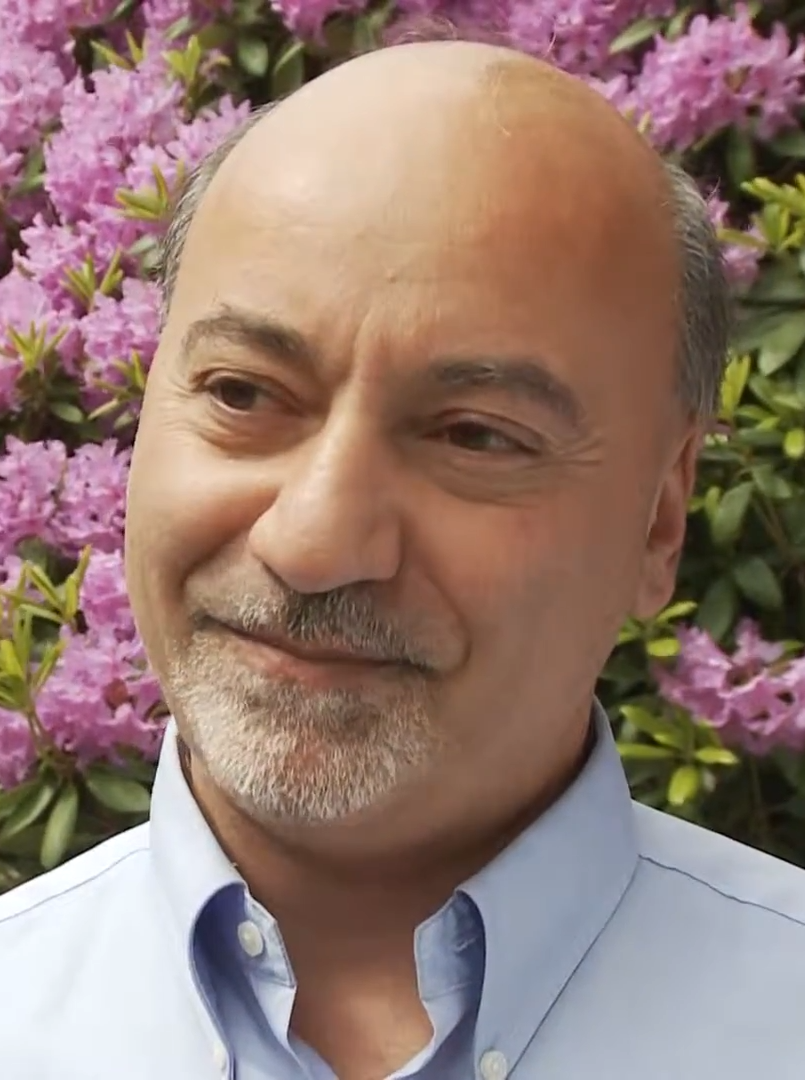

Member of the Alaska House of Representatives from the 23rd district
- In office January 20, 2003 – January 15, 2019
- Preceded by: Eldon Mulder
- Succeeded by: Zack Fields

Personal details
- Born: February 6, 1963 (age 63) New York City, New York, U.S.
- Party: Democratic
- Spouse: Kelly Gara
- Education: Boston University (BA); Harvard University (JD)

Leslie S. Gara (born February 6, 1963) is a Democratic former member of the Alaska House of Representatives, having represented the 23rd District from 2003 to 2019. Gara is also a former assistant attorney general and part owner of a local restaurant in Anchorage, Snow City Cafe.

== Early life ==
Gara was born on February 6, 1963, in New York City. He is of Iraqi-Jewish descent. He first started attending Freeport High School in 1977, graduating in 1981. Gara graduated from Boston University in 1985 with a Bachelor of Arts in history. He then earned his Juris Doctor from Harvard Law School in 1988. He served as a law clerk for Justice Jay Rabinowitz of the Alaska Supreme Court and was also an assistant attorney general. During his time as assistant attorney general he worked on the prosecution of the Exxon Valdez oil spill civil case.

== Political career ==
He was a former member of the Alaska House of Representatives, having represented the 23rd District from 2003 to 2019. In June 2018, Gara announced he would not be running for re-election.

=== 2022 election ===
On August 20, 2021, Gara announced that he would run for governor in 2022. He has criticized incumbent governor Mike Dunleavy for cutting funding for public education at the University of Alaska system. He supports "responsible development" of oil and has vowed to improve energy efficiency standards and address climate change, while opposing construction of Pebble Mine to protect fisheries. He also has pledged to protect access to Abortion in Alaska. He supported ranking former governor Bill Walker second in the governor's election under ranked-choice voting. In the election, he received 24.21% of the vote, and was defeated by incumbent governor Mike Dunleavy.

Alaska House of Representatives
Preceded by Eldon Mulder	Member of the Alaska House of Representatives from the 23rd district 2003–2019	Succeeded by Zack Fields
Party political offices
Preceded by Mark Begich	Democratic nominee for Governor of Alaska; 2022	Succeeded by Jonathan Kreiss-Tomkins
