= George–Little Rock Community School District =

Public school district in George, Iowa, United States

Coordinates: 43.341142°N 95.993721°W

Location
- George, Iowa Lyon, Osceola and Sioux counties United States
- Coordinates: 43.341142, -95.993721

District information
- Type: Local school district
- Grades: K–12
- Established: 2003
- Superintendent: Amanda Miller
- Schools: 4
- Budget: $7,5735,000 (2020-21)
- NCES District ID: 1912480

Students and staff
- Students: 426 (2022-23)
- Teachers: 34.52 FTE
- Staff: 26.94 FTE
- Student–teacher ratio: 12.34
- Athletic conference: Siouxland
- District mascot: Mustangs
- Colors: Red and Black

Other information
- Website: george-littlerock.org

George–Little Rock Community School District (G-LR) is a rural public school district headquartered at George–Little Rock Senior High School in George, Iowa. The district is mostly in Lyon County, with sections in Osceola and Sioux counties. In addition to George, it serves Little Rock.

== History ==
The district formed on July 1, 2003, by the merger of the George and Little Rock school districts.

Steve Barber, formerly principal of Spencer Middle School in the Spencer Community School District, began serving as superintendent of G-LR in 2013. In 2017 he moved to the Atlantic Community School District. John Eyerly, formerly of the Westfield Community School District, replaced him on July 1, 2017. Eyerly resigned in 2019. Tom Luxford began serving his tenure as superintendent in the 2020–21 school year, succeeding interim superintendent Pat O’Donnell.

== Schools ==
- George–Little Rock Senior High School (9–12) – George
- George–Little Rock Middle School (4–8) – Little Rock
- George–Little Rock Elementary School (PreK–3) – George

== See also ==
- List of school districts in Iowa
