= Little Rock River =

- Mouth of the Little Rock River

Location
- Country: US
- State: Iowa, Minnesota
- District: Lyon County, Iowa, Osceola County, Iowa, Nobles County, Minnesota

Physical characteristics
- Source
  - coordinates: 43°36′55″N 95°41′24″W
- Mouth: Rock River
  - location: Doon, Iowa, US
  - coordinates: 43°15′51″N 96°14′48″W
  - elevation: 1,250 ft (380 m)

The Little Rock River is a tributary of the Rock River, 74.5 miles (119.9 km) long, in southwestern Minnesota and northwestern Iowa in the United States. Via the Rock, Big Sioux and Missouri rivers, it is part of the watershed of the Mississippi River.

It has also been known as "Little Rock Creek".

== Course ==
The Little Rock River rises in Nobles County, Minnesota, 3 miles (5 km) west of the town of Worthington, and flows generally southwestward through Osceola and Lyon counties in Iowa, where it passes the towns of Little Rock and George. It flows into the Rock River about 1.5 miles (2.4 km) southwest of Doon.

== See also ==
- List of Iowa rivers
- List of Minnesota rivers
