= Hinton Community School District =

Public school district in Hinton, Iowa, United States

Coordinates: 42.625184°N 96.29608°W

Location
- Hinton, Iowa Plymouth County United States
- Coordinates: 42.625184, -96.29608

District information
- Type: Local school district
- Grades: K-12
- Superintendent: Ken Slater
- Schools: 2
- Budget: $11,352,000 (2020-21)
- NCES District ID: 1914160

Students and staff
- Students: 842 (2022-23)
- Teachers: 54.33 FTE
- Staff: 55.44 FTE
- Student–teacher ratio: 15.50
- Athletic conference: War Eagle
- District mascot: Blackhawks
- Colors: Black and Gold

Other information
- Website: www.hintonschool.com

The Hinton Community School District is a rural public school district headquartered in Hinton, Iowa.

The district is completely within southern Plymouth County, and serves the town of Hinton and the surrounding rural areas.

The school mascot is the Blackhawks, and their colors are black and gold.

Ken Slater has been the superintendent since 2020.

== Schools ==
The district operates three schools in one facility in Hinton:

- Hinton Elementary School
- Hinton Intermediate School
- Hinton High School

=== Hinton High School ===
==== Athletics ====
The Blackhawks compete in the War Eagle Conference in the following sports:

- Football
- Cross Country
- Volleyball
- Wrestling
- Basketball
  - Girls' 2025 Class 2A State Champions
- Golf
  - Boys' 2006 Class 1A State Champions
- Track and Field
- Baseball
- Softball

== See also ==
- List of school districts in Iowa
- List of high schools in Iowa
