= Storm Lake Community School District =

Public school district in Storm Lake, Iowa, United States

Coordinates: 42.642044°N 95.200435°W

Location
- Storm Lake, Iowa Buena Vista and Sac counties United States
- Coordinates: 42.642044, -95.200435

District information
- Type: Local school district
- Grades: K-12
- Superintendent: Dr. Stacey Cole
- Schools: 5
- Budget: $41,323,000 (2020-21)
- NCES District ID: 1927390

Students and staff
- Students: 2882 (2022-23)
- Teachers: 177.35 FTE
- Staff: 213.35 FTE
- Student–teacher ratio: 16.25
- Athletic conference: Siouxland Conference
- District mascot: Tornadoes
- Colors: Green and White

Other information
- Website: www.storm-lake.k12.ia.us

The Storm Lake Community School District is a public school district based in Storm Lake, Iowa. The district is mainly in Buena Vista County, with a small area in Sac County, and serves the town of Storm Lake and surrounding areas. It includes Lakeside.

The school's mascot is the Tornadoes. Their colors are green and white.

== Schools ==
The district operates five schools, all in Storm Lake:

- East Early Childhood Center
- Storm Lake Early Elementary School
- Storm Lake Elementary School
- Storm Lake Middle School
- Storm Lake High School

== Athletics ==
The Tornadoes compete in the Siouxland Conference in the following sports:

- Baseball (boys)
- Basketball (boys and girls)
  - Boys' 2-time State Champions (1968, 1980)
- Cross Country (boys and girls)
- Football
- Golf (boys and girls)
  - 1961 Boys' State Champions
- Soccer (boys and girls)
- Softball (girls)
- Swimming (boys and girls)
- Tennis (boys and girls)
- Track and Field (boys and girls)
  - Boys' 3-time Class 3A State Champions (1987, 1988, 2002)
- Volleyball (girls)
- Wrestling

== See also ==
- List of school districts in Iowa
- List of high schools in Iowa
