= Hinton, Iowa =

- City
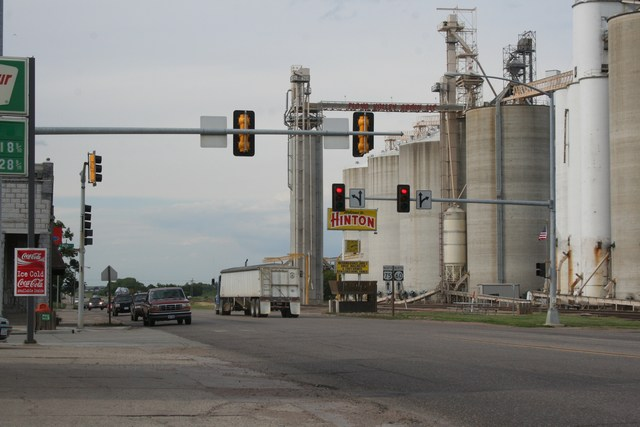
- Street scene in Hinton

- Location of Hinton, Iowa
- Coordinates: 42°37′28″N 96°17′42″W
- Country: USA
- State: Iowa
- County: Plymouth

Government
  - Type: Mayor-council

Area
  - Total: 0.71 sq mi (1.85 km^{2})
  - Land: 0.71 sq mi (1.85 km^{2})
  - Water: 0 sq mi (0.00 km^{2})
- Elevation: 1,168 ft (356 m)

Population (2020)
  - Total: 935
  - Density: 1,308.0/sq mi (505.02/km^{2})
- Time zone: UTC-6 (Central (CST))
  - Summer (DST): UTC-5 (CDT)
- ZIP code: 51024
- Area code: 712
- FIPS code: 19-36480
- GNIS feature ID: 2394391
- Website: www.hintoniowa.com

Hinton is a city in Plymouth County, Iowa, United States. The population was 935 at the time of the 2020 census.

== History ==
A post office called Hinton has been in operation since 1870. The city was named by a settler from Hinton, West Virginia. The current mayor, Kelly Kreber, is the second longest serving mayor in the towns history.

== Geography ==
According to the United States Census Bureau, the city has a total area of 0.69 square miles (1.79 km^{2}), all land.

== Demographics ==
Historical populations
Year	Pop.	±%
1910	329	—
1920	263	−20.1%
1930	289	+9.9%
1940	340	+17.6%
1950	345	+1.5%
1960	403	+16.8%
1970	488	+21.1%
1980	659	+35.0%
1990	697	+5.8%
2000	808	+15.9%
2010	928	+14.9%
2020	935	+0.8%
Source:"U.S. Census website". United States Census Bureau. and Iowa Data Center; Source: U.S. Decennial Census

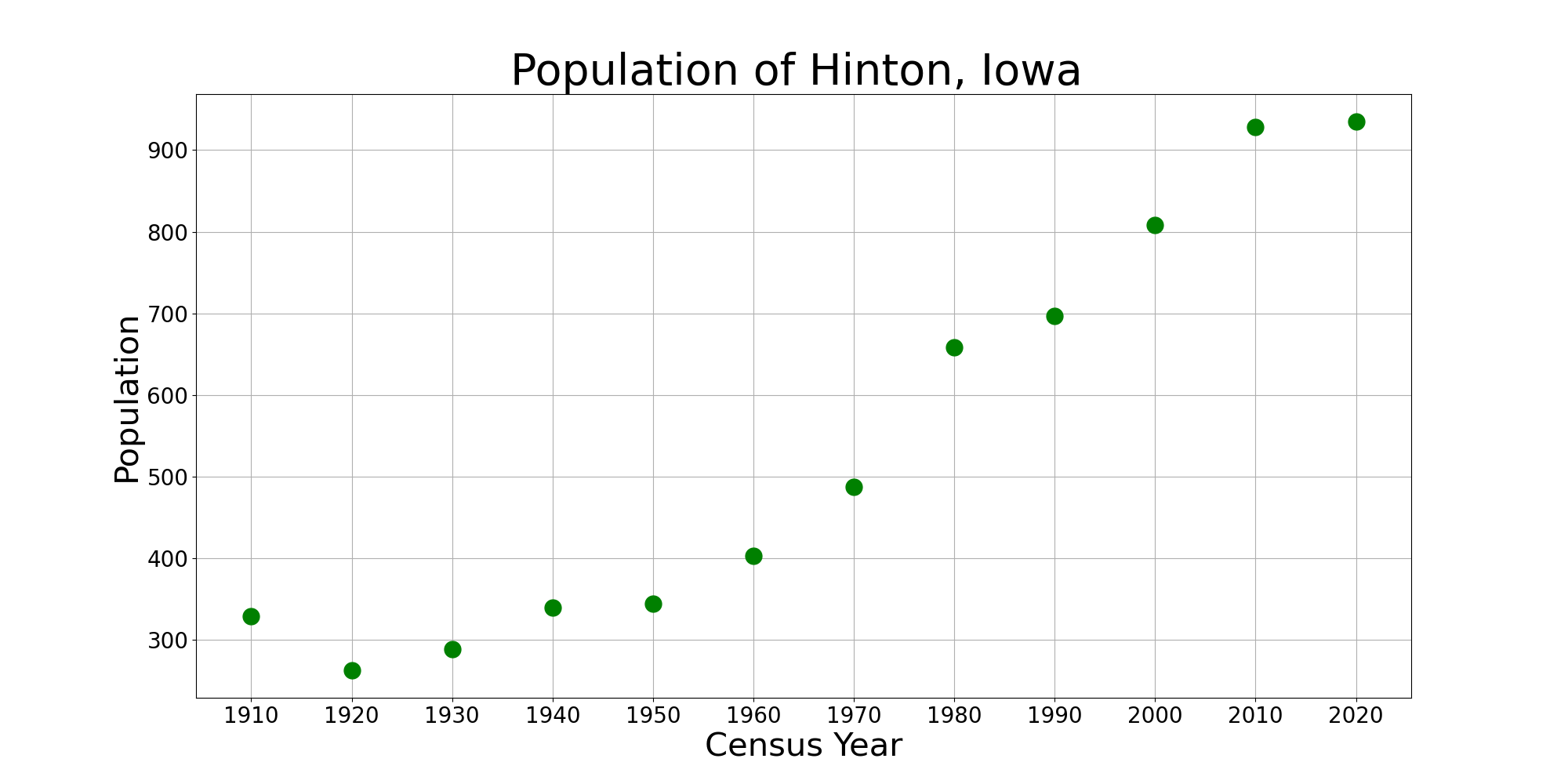
The population of Hinton, Iowa from US census data

=== 2020 census ===
As of the census of 2020, there were 935 people, 350 households, and 270 families residing in the city. The population density was 1,308.0 inhabitants per square mile (505.0/km^{2}). There were 375 housing units at an average density of 524.6 per square mile (202.5/km^{2}). The racial makeup of the city was 95.0% White, 0.3% Black or African American, 0.6% Native American, 0.3% Asian, 0.2% Pacific Islander, 0.3% from other races and 3.2% from two or more races. Hispanic or Latino persons of any race comprised 1.5% of the population.

Of the 350 households, 39.7% of which had children under the age of 18 living with them, 61.7% were married couples living together, 5.4% were cohabitating couples, 18.6% had a female householder with no spouse or partner present and 14.3% had a male householder with no spouse or partner present. 22.9% of all households were non-families. 18.0% of all households were made up of individuals, 8.3% had someone living alone who was 65 years old or older.

The median age in the city was 37.3 years. 31.8% of the residents were under the age of 20; 3.9% were between the ages of 20 and 24; 26.0% were from 25 and 44; 21.5% were from 45 and 64; and 16.9% were 65 years of age or older. The gender makeup of the city was 51.7% male and 48.3% female.

=== 2010 census ===
As of the census of 2010, there were 928 people, 363 households, and 270 families living in the city. The population density was 1,344.9 inhabitants per square mile (519.3/km^{2}). There were 374 housing units at an average density of 542.0 per square mile (209.3/km^{2}). The racial makeup of the city was 98.8% White, 0.3% African American, 0.2% Native American, 0.2% Asian, 0.1% from other races, and 0.3% from two or more races. Hispanic or Latino of any race were 0.6% of the population.

There were 363 households, of which 35.3% had children under the age of 18 living with them, 63.9% were married couples living together, 6.9% had a female householder with no husband present, 3.6% had a male householder with no wife present, and 25.6% were non-families. 22.3% of all households were made up of individuals, and 9.6% had someone living alone who was 65 years of age or older. The average household size was 2.56 and the average family size was 2.99.

The median age in the city was 39.1 years. 26.4% of residents were under the age of 18; 6.2% were between the ages of 18 and 24; 24.8% were from 25 to 44; 28.6% were from 45 to 64; and 14% were 65 years of age or older. The gender makeup of the city was 51.5% male and 48.5% female.

=== 2000 census ===
As of the census of 2000, there were 808 people, 303 households, and 226 families living in the city. The population density was 1,386.1 inhabitants per square mile (535.2/km^{2}). There were 319 housing units at an average density of 547.2 per square mile (211.3/km^{2}). The racial makeup of the city was 97.90% White, 0.50% African American, 0.37% Asian, 0.12% Pacific Islander, 0.37% from other races, and 0.74% from two or more races. Hispanic or Latino of any race were 0.62% of the population.

There were 303 households, out of which 39.3% had children under the age of 18 living with them, 66.0% were married couples living together, 6.6% had a female householder with no husband present, and 25.1% were non-families. 19.5% of all households were made up of individuals, and 10.2% had someone living alone who was 65 years of age or older. The average household size was 2.67 and the average family size was 3.08.

In the city, the population was spread out, with 28.1% under the age of 18, 6.1% from 18 to 24, 27.2% from 25 to 44, 25.4% from 45 to 64, and 13.2% who were 65 years of age or older. The median age was 38 years. For every 100 females, there were 98.0 males. For every 100 females age 18 and over, there were 95.6 males.

== Education ==
The Hinton Community School District operates local public schools.

Hinton's high school mascot is the Blackhawk, presumably after Ioway Indian tribal leader Chief Black Hawk. The school's athletics teams compete in the War Eagle Conference. The boys' and girls' golf teams both made state appearances in 2004, 2006 & 2007, with the boys winning 1st place overall in 2006.

== Notable people ==
- Sam Clovis, former fighter pilot, retired United States Air Force colonel and senior White House adviser under President Donald Trump
- Ron Wieck, graduated from Hinton High School, Republican member of Iowa Senate 2003–2010
