= Central Lyon Community School District =

Public school district in Rock Rapids, Iowa, United States

Coordinates: 43.420326°N 96.168928°W

Location
- Rock Rapids, Iowa Lyon County United States
- Coordinates: 43.420326, -96.168928

District information
- Type: Local school district
- Grades: K-12
- Superintendent: Brent Jorth
- Schools: 3
- Budget: $12,355,000 (2020-21)
- NCES District ID: 1906960

Students and staff
- Students: 796 (2022-23)
- Teachers: 61.30 FTE
- Staff: 53.33 FTE
- Student–teacher ratio: 12.99
- Athletic conference: Siouxland
- District mascot: Lions
- Colors: Purple and Gold

Other information
- Website: www.centrallyon.org

Central Lyon Community School District is a rural public school district headquartered in Rock Rapids, Iowa. The district is completely within Lyon County, and serves Rock Rapids and the town Doon, and the surrounding rural areas.

Brent Jorth has served as superintendent since 2019.

== Schools ==
The district operates three schools on a single campus at 1010 S. Greene Street, Rock Rapids:

- Central Lyon Senior High School
- Central Lyon Middle School
- Central Lyon Elementary School

=== Central Lyon Senior High School ===
==== Athletics ====
The Lions are members of the Siouxland Conference, and participate in the following sports:

- Football
  - 4-time Class 2A State Champions (1976, 1977, 2006, 2022 (as Central Lyon-George-Little))
- Cross Country
  - Boys' 1969 State Champions (as Central Lyon), and 2017 Class 2A State Champions (as Central Lyon-George-Little)
- Volleyball
- Basketball
  - Girls' 2013 Class 1A State Champions
  - Boys’ 2023 Class 2A State Champions
- Wrestling
- Golf
- Soccer
- Track and Field
  - Girls' 2010 Class 1A State Champions
- Baseball
- Softball

== See also ==
- List of school districts in Iowa
- List of high schools in Iowa
