= Cherokee Community School District =

Public school district in Cherokee, Iowa, United States

Coordinates: 42.756329°N 95.556154°W

Location
- Cherokee, Iowa Cherokee County United States
- Coordinates: 42.756329, -95.556154

District information
- Type: Local school district
- Grades: K-12
- Established: 1960
- Superintendent: Tom Ryherd
- Schools: 3
- Budget: $19,929,000 (2020-21)
- NCES District ID: 1907170

Students and staff
- Students: 1200 (2022-23)
- Teachers: 81.78 FTE
- Staff: 85.44 FTE
- Student–teacher ratio: 14.67
- Athletic conference: Siouxland Conference
- District mascot: Braves
- Colors: Black and Gold

Other information
- Website: www.ccsd.k12.ia.us

The Cherokee Community School District is a rural public school district based in Cherokee, Iowa. The district is completely within Cherokee County, and serves the towns of Cherokee and Larrabee and surrounding areas.

The school's mascot is the Braves. Their colors are black and gold.

== History ==
The first term of school taught in Cherokee was in 1858. Various unnamed log cabins and wood structures served as schools in this early period. The courthouse, built in 1864, included a schoolroom.

Webster School was built in 1881. It was demolished in 1971, and "New" Webster was built. By 1988, it was used strictly for fourth grade. Later, the fourth grade was moved to Roosevelt and it was converted to use as the Early Childhood Learning Center.

Garfield School was built in 1884, to replace the Cherokee schoolhouse that burned down on December 20, 1883. It contained seven classrooms and two recitation rooms. The first class to graduate from high school in Cherokee was in 1884, consisting of six students. The building was razed in 1934, and a new Garfield School was built on the same site, and served as the lower grade elementary school until 2001.

Lincoln High School opened in 1885, and housed primary school on the ground floor and high school on the second floor. The building included an auditorium and classrooms, including a laboratory. It served as the high school until 1916, when the second floor became the junior high, with the construction of the Wilson High School.

Larrabee School was constructed in 1912. Named after the former governor, who with his wife, purchased the land and funded the construction of the school. The building was demolished in 1989.

Wilson High School was built in 1916. Constructed of riveted steel and concrete, it was considered fireproof. The original building was 35,300 square feet, with another 1,150 square feet added in 1939. The building consisted of 24 classrooms, office, and a library. The east wing included a gymnasium and a large auditorium above the gymnasium. This building served as the high school until 1953, then served as the middle school until 2001. In 1971, a portion of the building was renovated and additional classrooms and library spaces were constructed. The gymnasium was renovated in 1982.

Construction for Washington High School began in 1952 for a 26,850 sq ft building, designed for future additions of a gymnasium, auditorium and additional classrooms. The gymnasium, locker rooms and an industrial arts room were added in 1956. A 50,452 sq ft addition, including the auditorium were constructed in 1972.

Two elementary schools were constructed in 1960-61: "New" Lincoln Elementary and Roosevelt Elementary. Due to poor location within the floodplain, Lincoln was closed in 1985, sold in 1993, and has since been demolished. Additions were constructed at Roosevelt in 1971, 1985, and 2000. Roosevelt was bought by the hospital next door. Roosevelt was demolished in 2022, replaced by Cherokee Elementary School.

In 1960, Cherokee Community School District was formed from merger of the Cherokee Independent School District, Cherokee Township School District, Afton Consolidated School District, Pilot Township School District, and a portion of Rock Township School District. The new district was an area of about 75 sections, or 75 square miles.

Cherokee Middle School was dedicated in 2001, serving 5th through 8th grades, replacing Garfield and Wilson.

Cherokee Elementary School was built in 2021. It was added on to Cherokee Middle School.

== Schools ==
The district operates three schools, all in Cherokee:

- Cherokee Elementary School
- Cherokee Middle School
- Washington High School

=== Washington High School ===
- On 600 West Bluff Street

==== Athletics ====
The Braves compete in the Siouxland Conference in the following sports:

- Baseball (boys)
  - 2007 Class 2A State Champions
- Basketball (boys and girls)
- Cross Country (boys and girls)
- Football
- Golf (boys and girls)
  - 1966 Boys' State Champions
- Soccer (boys and girls)
- Softball (girls)
- Swimming (boys and girls)
- Tennis (boys and girls)
- Track and Field (boys and girls)
  - Boys' 2-time State Champions (1966, 1994)
- Volleyball (girls)
- Wrestling
  - 1939 State Champions

== See also ==
- List of school districts in Iowa
- List of high schools in Iowa
