= Rock Rapids, Iowa =

- City
- Logo
- Motto: "Our River Flowing, Our Community Growing"
- Location within Lyon County and Iowa
- Coordinates: 43°25′38″N 96°09′58″W
- Country: United States
- State: Iowa
- County: Lyon

Area
  - Total: 4.26 sq mi (11.03 km^{2})
  - Land: 4.21 sq mi (10.90 km^{2})
  - Water: 0.050 sq mi (0.13 km^{2})
- Elevation: 1,342 ft (409 m)

Population (2020)
  - Total: 2,611
  - Density: 620.4/sq mi (239.52/km^{2})
- Time zone: UTC-6 (Central (CST))
  - Summer (DST): UTC-5 (CDT)
- ZIP code: 51246
- Area code: 712
- FIPS code: 19-68160
- GNIS feature ID: 2396402
- Website: rockrapids.com

Rock Rapids is a city in and the county seat of Lyon County, Iowa, United States. The population was 2,611 in the 2020 census, an increase from 2,573 in the 2000 census.

== History ==
A post office called Rock Rapids has been in operation since 1871. The city was named from the falls on the Rock River.

== Geography ==
Rock Rapids is located along the Rock River.

According to the United States Census Bureau, the city has a total area of 3.96 square miles (10.26 km^{2}), all land.

=== Climate ===
Rock Rapids has a humid continental climate (Koppen Dfa), with cold winters and hot summers.

Climate data for Rock Rapids, Iowa (1991−2020 normals, extremes 1893−present)
Month	Jan	Feb	Mar	Apr	May	Jun	Jul	Aug	Sep	Oct	Nov	Dec	Year
Record high °F (°C)	68 (20)	70 (21)	90 (32)	95 (35)	106 (41)	107 (42)	111 (44)	109 (43)	104 (40)	94 (34)	80 (27)	70 (21)	111 (44)
Mean maximum °F (°C)	46.8 (8.2)	51.8 (11.0)	69.8 (21.0)	82.1 (27.8)	89.6 (32.0)	94.4 (34.7)	94.5 (34.7)	93.6 (34.2)	90.0 (32.2)	83.6 (28.7)	66.3 (19.1)	49.4 (9.7)	97.1 (36.2)
Mean daily maximum °F (°C)	25.2 (−3.8)	30.3 (−0.9)	43.2 (6.2)	57.9 (14.4)	70.3 (21.3)	80.7 (27.1)	84.7 (29.3)	82.3 (27.9)	75.3 (24.1)	61.1 (16.2)	44.2 (6.8)	30.3 (−0.9)	57.1 (13.9)
Daily mean °F (°C)	15.6 (−9.1)	20.4 (−6.4)	32.7 (0.4)	45.8 (7.7)	58.5 (14.7)	69.5 (20.8)	73.3 (22.9)	70.6 (21.4)	62.4 (16.9)	48.6 (9.2)	33.6 (0.9)	21.2 (−6.0)	46.0 (7.8)
Mean daily minimum °F (°C)	6.1 (−14.4)	10.4 (−12.0)	22.3 (−5.4)	33.8 (1.0)	46.8 (8.2)	58.3 (14.6)	61.8 (16.6)	59.0 (15.0)	49.6 (9.8)	36.2 (2.3)	23.0 (−5.0)	12.1 (−11.1)	35.0 (1.7)
Mean minimum °F (°C)	−16.6 (−27.0)	−9.8 (−23.2)	0.0 (−17.8)	18.8 (−7.3)	32.3 (0.2)	45.3 (7.4)	50.6 (10.3)	47.8 (8.8)	34.0 (1.1)	20.0 (−6.7)	5.0 (−15.0)	−9.3 (−22.9)	−19.5 (−28.6)
Record low °F (°C)	−40 (−40)	−40 (−40)	−23 (−31)	3 (−16)	20 (−7)	32 (0)	32 (0)	34 (1)	18 (−8)	−10 (−23)	−20 (−29)	−30 (−34)	−40 (−40)
Average precipitation inches (mm)	0.61 (15)	0.70 (18)	1.52 (39)	3.03 (77)	3.96 (101)	5.03 (128)	3.59 (91)	3.12 (79)	3.24 (82)	2.23 (57)	1.42 (36)	0.82 (21)	29.27 (743)
Average snowfall inches (cm)	6.0 (15)	7.3 (19)	5.6 (14)	3.5 (8.9)	0.1 (0.25)	0.0 (0.0)	0.0 (0.0)	0.0 (0.0)	0.0 (0.0)	0.4 (1.0)	3.6 (9.1)	8.4 (21)	34.9 (89)
Average precipitation days (≥ 0.01 in)	4.6	4.7	5.8	8.5	12.0	10.5	7.7	8.5	7.4	6.6	4.5	5.1	85.9
Average snowy days (≥ 0.1 in)	3.6	3.8	2.5	1.2	0.0	0.0	0.0	0.0	0.0	0.4	1.7	3.7	16.9
Source: NOAA

== Demographics ==
Historical population
Census	Pop.	Note	%±
1890	1,394		—
1900	1,766		26.7%
1910	2,005		13.5%
1920	2,172		8.3%
1930	2,221		2.3%
1940	2,556		15.1%
1950	2,640		3.3%
1960	2,780		5.3%
1970	2,632		−5.3%
1980	2,693		2.3%
1990	2,601		−3.4%
2000	2,573		−1.1%
2010	2,549		−0.9%
2020	2,611		2.4%
U.S. Decennial Census

=== 2020 census ===
As of the 2020 census, Rock Rapids had a population of 2,611, with 1,049 households and 667 families residing in the city. The population density was 620.4 inhabitants per square mile (239.5/km^{2}), and there were 1,145 housing units at an average density of 272.0 per square mile (105.0/km^{2}).

The median age was 39.3 years. 26.7% of residents were under the age of 18, 28.7% were under the age of 20, 4.4% were from 20 to 24, 23.7% were from 25 to 44, 21.3% were from 45 to 64, and 21.8% were 65 years of age or older. For every 100 females there were 96.8 males, and for every 100 females age 18 and over there were 89.8 males age 18 and over. The gender makeup of the city was 49.2% male and 50.8% female.

There were 1,049 households, of which 28.7% had children under the age of 18 living in them. Of all households, 53.3% were married-couple households, 4.1% were cohabiting-couple households, 25.0% had a female householder with no spouse or partner present, and 17.6% had a male householder with no spouse or partner present. About 36.4% of households were non-families, 32.9% were made up of individuals, and 16.2% had someone living alone who was 65 years of age or older.

There were 1,145 housing units, of which 8.4% were vacant. The homeowner vacancy rate was 2.6% and the rental vacancy rate was 5.5%. 0.0% of residents lived in urban areas, while 100.0% lived in rural areas.

Racial composition as of the 2020 census
Race	Number	Percent
White	2,456	94.1%
Black or African American	14	0.5%
American Indian and Alaska Native	10	0.4%
Asian	8	0.3%
Native Hawaiian and Other Pacific Islander	0	0.0%
Some other race	42	1.6%
Two or more races	81	3.1%
Hispanic or Latino (of any race)	91	3.5%

=== 2010 census ===
As of the census of 2010, there were 2,549 people, 1,083 households, and 689 families living in the city. The population density was 643.7 inhabitants per square mile (248.5/km^{2}). There were 1,207 housing units at an average density of 304.8 per square mile (117.7/km^{2}). The racial makeup of the city was 98.2% White, 0.2% African American, 0.1% Native American, 0.1% Asian, 0.8% from other races, and 0.6% from two or more races. Hispanic or Latino of any race were 1.8% of the population.

There were 1,083 households, of which 28.3% had children under the age of 18 living with them, 53.2% were married couples living together, 8.0% had a female householder with no husband present, 2.4% had a male householder with no wife present, and 36.4% were non-families. 33.7% of all households were made up of individuals, and 18.4% had someone living alone who was 65 years of age or older. The average household size was 2.28 and the average family size was 2.92.

The median age in the city was 42.1 years. 24.4% of residents were under the age of 18; 6.2% were between the ages of 18 and 24; 23% were from 25 to 44; 24.6% were from 45 to 64; and 21.9% were 65 years of age or older. The gender makeup of the city was 47.1% male and 52.9% female.

=== 2000 census ===
As of the census of 2000, there were 2,573 people, 1,085 households, and 720 families living in the city. The population density was 650.2 inhabitants per square mile (251.0/km^{2}). There were 1,160 housing units at an average density of 293.1 per square mile (113.2/km^{2}). The racial makeup of the city was 99.14% White, 0.16% African American, 0.04% Native American, 0.35% Asian, 0.04% from other races, and 0.27% from two or more races. Hispanic or Latino of any race were 0.23% of the population.

There were 1,085 households, out of which 27.7% had children under the age of 18 living with them, 57.7% were married couples living together, 6.6% had a female householder with no husband present, and 33.6% were non-families. 31.3% of all households were made up of individuals, and 17.6% had someone living alone who was 65 years of age or older. The average household size was 2.28 and the average family size was 2.86.

23.5% are under the age of 18, 6.2% from 18 to 24, 22.5% from 25 to 44, 21.7% from 45 to 64, and 26.1% who were 65 years of age or older. The median age was 43 years. For every 100 females, there were 87.8 males. For every 100 females age 18 and over, there were 81.8 males.

The median income for a household in the city was $35,135, and the median income for a family was $47,688. Males had a median income of $30,691 versus $19,425 for females. The per capita income for the city was $18,035. About 3.4% of families and 7.5% of the population were below the poverty line, including 7.0% of those under age 18 and 12.5% of those age 65 or over.

== Education ==
Rock Rapids is served by the Central Lyon Community School District. The town of Doon is also included in this school district.

== Parks and recreation ==
One of the highlights of Rock Rapids is Island Park, so named because part of the park is completely surrounded by the Rock River. Island Park features a Rock Island railroad trestle that has been resurfaced as part of a new recreation trail and a museum in the nearby retired depot. There are two small dams in the park.

Another notable park is Emma Sater Park, which is home to the Melan Bridge.

== Mural Society ==
The Rock Rapids Mural Society was formed in 2002 to restore its historic past in artistic form.

== Notable people ==
- Bruce B. Brugmann, editor and publisher of the San Francisco Bay Guardian
- Constance Congdon, American playwright and librettist
- Donald Jay Grout, historian and author of A History of Western Music
- Jack Halloran, American composer and choral director
- Jerry Mathers, Leave It to Beaver star

== See also ==
- Rock River
- Rock Rapids BCR&N station
