= Sioux Center Community School District =

Public school district in Sioux Center, Iowa, United States

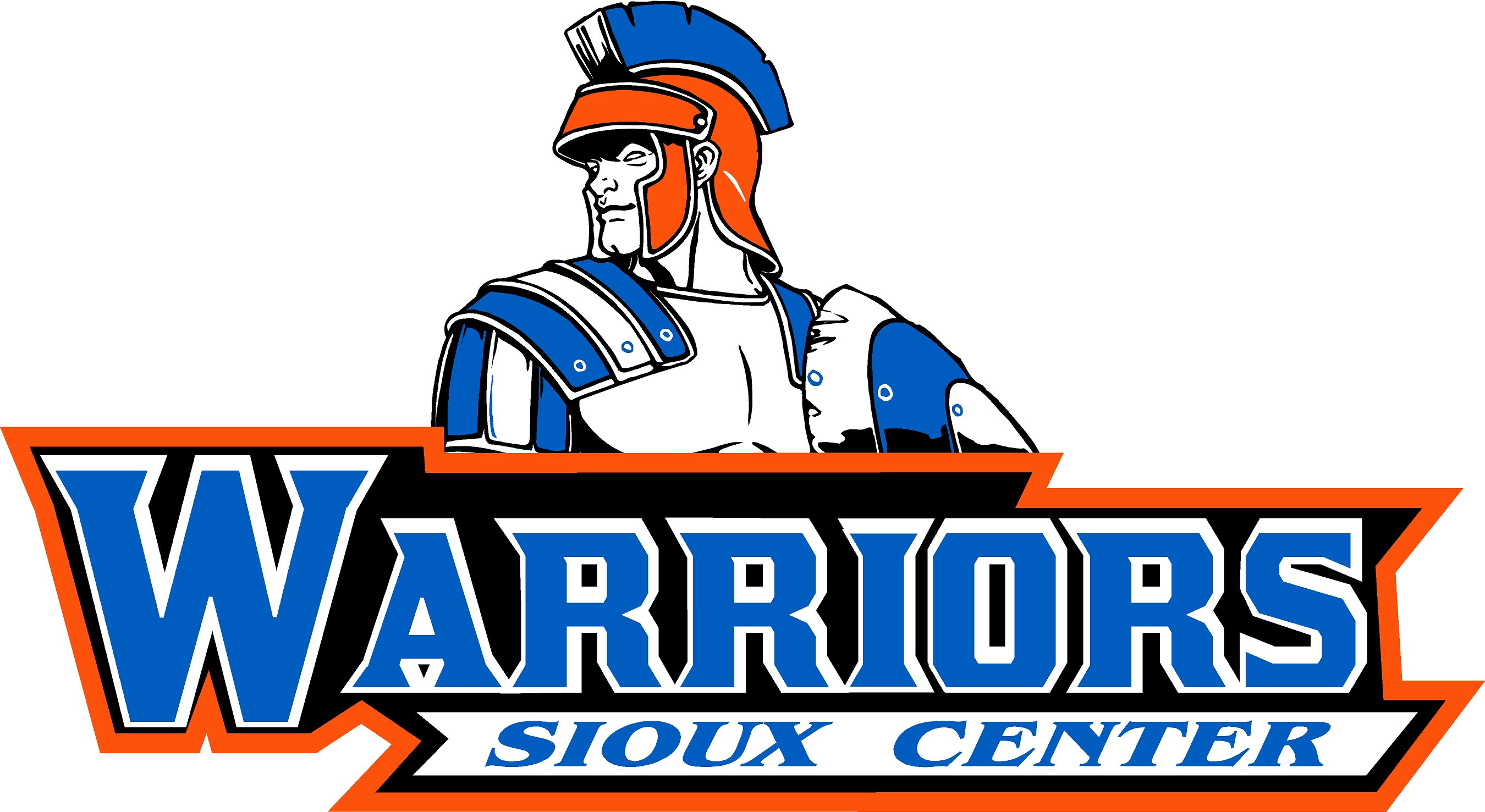

Location
- Sioux Center, Iowa Sioux County United States
- Coordinates: 43.0865°N 96.1689°W

District information
- Type: Public School District
- Motto: "Educating the Whole Student for a Whole Lifetime"
- Grades: TK-12
- Established: 1 July 1958
- Superintendent: Gary McEldowney
- Schools: 5
- Budget: $30,695,000 (2020-21)
- NCES District ID: 1926370

Students and staff
- Students: 1725 (2022-23)
- Teachers: 113.85 FTE
- Staff: 129.49 FTE
- Student–teacher ratio: 15.15
- Athletic conference: Siouxland Conference
- District mascot: Warrior
- Colors: Orange and Blue

Other information
- Website: scwarriors.org

Sioux Center Community School District is a rural public school district located in Sioux Center, Iowa. It is entirely within Sioux County, and serves Sioux Center and the surrounding rural areas.

Gary McEldowney has served as superintendent since 2018.

== Schools ==
=== Little Warrior Preschool ===
For children at least 4 years old and for 3 year olds with an IEP.

=== Kinsey Elementary ===
Kinsey Elementary includes grades TK-3. TK is a half-day transitional kindergarten.

=== Sioux Center Intermediate School ===
The intermediate school includes grades 4–5. In 2021, the 4th grade left Kinsey Elementary and joined the 5th grade to become the new christened Intermediate School in the previous Middle School facilities. The Intermediate School and Middle School are conjoined, sharing a library, art room, and some music facilities.

=== Sioux Center Middle School ===
The middle school includes grades 6–8. In 2021, the middle school moved into the previous High School facilities. 5th grade was no longer a part of the Middle School but remained in the previous facilities, now the Intermediate School. The Intermediate School and Middle School are conjoined, sharing a library, art room, and some music facilities.

=== Sioux Center High School ===
Established in 1973, the high school includes grades 9–12. In 2021, the high school moved into new facilities.

== Sioux Center High School ==
=== Activities ===
Some of the student activities are FFA, JETS, Key Club, and Math Team.

==== Athletics ====
Sioux Center High School has Basketball, Baseball, Cross Country, Volleyball, Football, Track and Field, Golf, Wrestling, Softball, and Soccer. The Warriors compete in the Siouxland Conference.

State Championships

Sioux Center's varsity teams have won three basketball titles, a football championship, and two each boys' and girls' state track meets.

- Boys' Basketball - 1959, 1967, 2003
- Football - 1972
- Boys' Track and Field - 1980, 1982
- Girls' Track and Field - 1979, 1980
- Girls' Basketball- 2023

== Recent Initiatives ==
A 1 to 1 initiative has been implemented in the 2013–14 school year. All 7th and 8th graders received a laptop for use at school and home. The laptop will "travel" with the students as they progress through the grades, and each successive class of 7th graders will receive their own laptop.

Iowa Tests of Basic Skills is a set of standardized tests given annually to students in Sioux Center Schools.

== Notable alumni ==
- Vern Den Herder, retired professional football player
- Ko Kieft, professional football player
- Dennis Muilenburg, former CEO of The Boeing Company
- Eldon Mulder, former member of the Alaska House of Representatives
- Christian Rozeboom, professional football player

== See also ==
- List of school districts in Iowa
- List of high schools in Iowa
