= Lake Park, Iowa =

- City
- Motto: A great place to spend a vacation or a lifetime
- Location of Lake Park, Iowa
- Coordinates: 43°26′49″N 95°19′34″W
- Country: USA
- State: Iowa
- County: Dickinson

Area
  - Total: 1.65 sq mi (4.27 km^{2})
  - Land: 1.58 sq mi (4.09 km^{2})
  - Water: 0.069 sq mi (0.18 km^{2})
- Elevation: 1,470 ft (450 m)

Population (2020)
  - Total: 1,167
  - Density: 739.6/sq mi (285.58/km^{2})
- Time zone: UTC-6 (Central (CST))
  - Summer (DST): UTC-5 (CDT)
- ZIP code: 51347
- Area code: 712
- FIPS code: 19-42600
- GNIS feature ID: 2395598
- Website: www.lakeparkia.com

Lake Park is a city in Dickinson County, Iowa, United States. The population was 1,167 at the time of the 2020 census. Trappers Bay State Park is located just west of the town.

== History ==
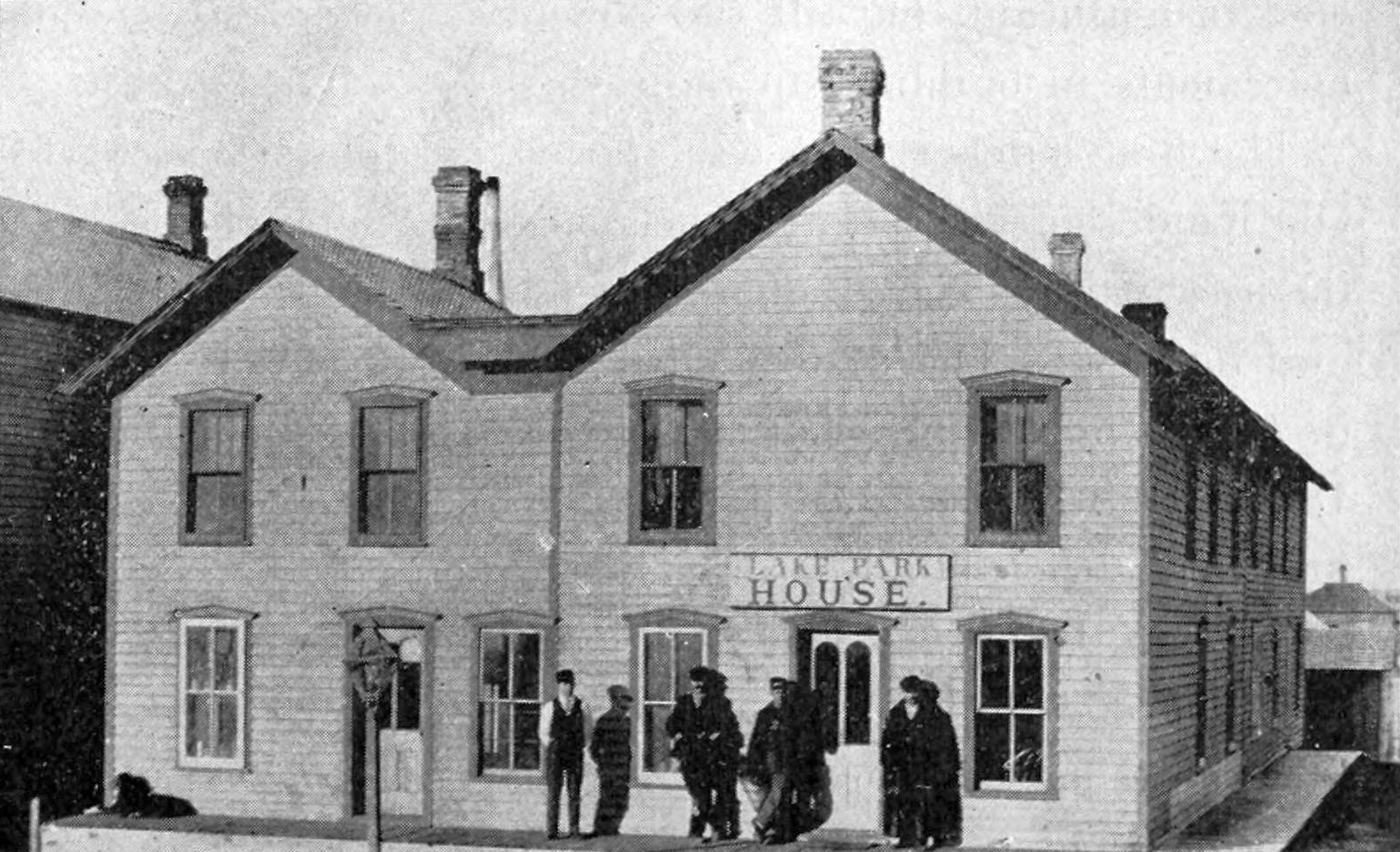
The Pioneer Hotel in Lake Park, 1902

Lake Park had its start in the year 1882 by the building of the Burlington, Cedar Rapids and Northern Railway through that territory. Lake Park was incorporated in 1892.

On January 1, 1931, the new State Theatre was officially opened. In 1942, a tornado swept through the area, destroying many farm buildings. A new water treatment plant was built in 1970. In September 1980, Lake Park gained its own ambulance. On July 2, 2002, voters in the Harris–Lake Park School District approved a $4 million bond issue for the construction of a new educational facility on Lake Park's south side. In addition to the development of a new community center, shared public/school library and athletic fields were planned in the city. In 2003 an open house was held to officially open the new community center.

== Education ==
Lake Park is served by the Harris–Lake Park Community School District.

== Geography ==
According to the United States Census Bureau, the city has a total area of 1.61 square miles (4.17 km^{2}), of which 1.55 square miles (4.01 km^{2}) is land and 0.06 square miles (0.16 km^{2}) is water.

=== Climate ===
Climate data for Lake Park, Iowa (1991−2020 normals, extremes 1912−present)
Month	Jan	Feb	Mar	Apr	May	Jun	Jul	Aug	Sep	Oct	Nov	Dec	Year
Record high °F (°C)	67 (19)	65 (18)	87 (31)	96 (36)	107 (42)	106 (41)	107 (42)	105 (41)	103 (39)	95 (35)	80 (27)	68 (20)	107 (42)
Mean maximum °F (°C)	44.2 (6.8)	48.7 (9.3)	67.7 (19.8)	81.5 (27.5)	90.1 (32.3)	94.9 (34.9)	95.2 (35.1)	93.8 (34.3)	90.4 (32.4)	83.6 (28.7)	65.2 (18.4)	47.8 (8.8)	97.7 (36.5)
Mean daily maximum °F (°C)	24.1 (−4.4)	28.5 (−1.9)	41.6 (5.3)	57.1 (13.9)	70.0 (21.1)	81.1 (27.3)	85.2 (29.6)	82.5 (28.1)	75.6 (24.2)	60.8 (16.0)	43.4 (6.3)	29.2 (−1.6)	56.6 (13.7)
Daily mean °F (°C)	14.9 (−9.5)	19.1 (−7.2)	31.8 (−0.1)	45.7 (7.6)	58.7 (14.8)	70.2 (21.2)	74.0 (23.3)	71.3 (21.8)	63.3 (17.4)	49.2 (9.6)	33.6 (0.9)	20.7 (−6.3)	46.0 (7.8)
Mean daily minimum °F (°C)	5.7 (−14.6)	9.7 (−12.4)	22.0 (−5.6)	34.3 (1.3)	47.4 (8.6)	59.3 (15.2)	62.9 (17.2)	60.1 (15.6)	51.1 (10.6)	37.7 (3.2)	23.9 (−4.5)	12.1 (−11.1)	35.5 (1.9)
Mean minimum °F (°C)	−15.5 (−26.4)	−9.8 (−23.2)	−0.6 (−18.1)	20.2 (−6.6)	33.4 (0.8)	47.6 (8.7)	52.8 (11.6)	49.8 (9.9)	35.8 (2.1)	22.8 (−5.1)	6.7 (−14.1)	−9.0 (−22.8)	−18.4 (−28.0)
Record low °F (°C)	−38 (−39)	−33 (−36)	−24 (−31)	1 (−17)	16 (−9)	34 (1)	42 (6)	36 (2)	22 (−6)	6 (−14)	−11 (−24)	−29 (−34)	−38 (−39)
Average precipitation inches (mm)	0.82 (21)	0.84 (21)	1.67 (42)	3.37 (86)	4.59 (117)	5.04 (128)	3.81 (97)	3.50 (89)	2.91 (74)	2.39 (61)	1.49 (38)	0.98 (25)	31.41 (798)
Average snowfall inches (cm)	8.4 (21)	8.7 (22)	6.3 (16)	3.4 (8.6)	0.0 (0.0)	0.0 (0.0)	0.0 (0.0)	0.0 (0.0)	0.0 (0.0)	0.6 (1.5)	4.4 (11)	9.2 (23)	41.0 (104)
Average precipitation days (≥ 0.01 in)	5.2	4.8	6.2	9.6	12.0	11.2	8.5	8.8	7.7	7.4	4.8	5.3	91.5
Average snowy days (≥ 0.1 in)	4.2	4.2	2.8	1.1	0.0	0.0	0.0	0.0	0.0	0.5	2.3	4.2	19.3
Source: NOAA

== Demographics ==
Historical populations
Year	Pop.	±%
1900	541	—
1910	552	+2.0%
1920	789	+42.9%
1930	708	−10.3%
1940	828	+16.9%
1950	924	+11.6%
1960	952	+3.0%
1970	918	−3.6%
1980	1,123	+22.3%
1990	996	−11.3%
2000	1,023	+2.7%
2010	1,105	+8.0%
2020	1,167	+5.6%
Source:"U.S. Census website". United States Census Bureau. and Iowa Data Center; Source: U.S. Decennial Census

=== 2020 census ===
As of the 2020 census, there were 1,167 people, 516 households, and 335 families residing in the city. The population density was 739.6 inhabitants per square mile (285.6/km^{2}). There were 626 housing units at an average density of 396.8 per square mile (153.2/km^{2}).

There were 516 households in the city, of which 29.7% had children under the age of 18 living with them. Of all households, 49.0% were married-couple households, 7.4% were cohabitating couples, 26.4% had a female householder with no spouse or partner present, and 17.2% had a male householder with no spouse or partner present. 35.1% of all households were non-families, 30.4% of all households were made up of individuals, and 18.2% had someone living alone who was 65 years of age or older.

The median age in the city was 46.1 years. 21.0% of residents were under the age of 18. 23.1% of residents were under the age of 20; 3.9% were between the ages of 20 and 24; 21.3% were from 25 to 44; 25.9% were from 45 to 64; and 25.7% were 65 years of age or older. The gender makeup of the city was 50.4% male and 49.6% female. For every 100 females, there were 101.6 males, and for every 100 females age 18 and over there were 93.7 males age 18 and over.

0.0% of residents lived in urban areas, while 100.0% lived in rural areas.

There were 626 housing units, of which 17.6% were vacant. The homeowner vacancy rate was 1.4% and the rental vacancy rate was 10.1%.

Racial composition as of the 2020 census
Race	Number	Percent
White	1,119	95.9%
Black or African American	6	0.5%
American Indian and Alaska Native	3	0.3%
Asian	2	0.2%
Native Hawaiian and Other Pacific Islander	0	0.0%
Some other race	3	0.3%
Two or more races	34	2.9%
Hispanic or Latino (of any race)	14	1.2%

=== 2010 census ===
As of the census of 2010, there were 1,105 people, 486 households, and 307 families residing in the city. The population density was 712.9 inhabitants per square mile (275.3/km^{2}). There were 594 housing units at an average density of 383.2 per square mile (148.0/km^{2}). The racial makeup of the city was 98.6% White, 0.5% from other races, and 1.0% from two or more races. Hispanic or Latino of any race were 1.0% of the population.

There were 486 households, of which 24.3% had children under the age of 18 living with them, 53.9% were married couples living together, 6.6% had a female householder with no husband present, 2.7% had a male householder with no wife present, and 36.8% were non-families. 31.7% of all households were made up of individuals, and 14.6% had someone living alone who was 65 years of age or older. The average household size was 2.21 and the average family size was 2.78.

The median age in the city was 47.3 years. 21.4% of residents were under the age of 18; 4.7% were between the ages of 18 and 24; 21.2% were from 25 to 44; 27.5% were from 45 to 64; and 25.1% were 65 years of age or older. The gender makeup of the city was 49.1% male and 50.9% female.

=== 2000 census ===
As of the census of 2000, there were 1,023 people, 442 households, and 300 families residing in the city. The population density was 687.7 inhabitants per square mile (265.5/km^{2}). There were 519 housing units at an average density of 348.9 per square mile (134.7/km^{2}). The racial makeup of the city was 99.32% White, 0.10% Asian, and 0.59% from two or more races. Hispanic or Latino of any race were 0.39% of the population.

There were 442 households, out of which 24.7% had children under the age of 18 living with them, 59.5% were married couples living together, 5.9% had a female householder with no husband present, and 32.1% were non-families. 29.4% of all households were made up of individuals, and 15.2% had someone living alone who was 65 years of age or older. The average household size was 2.21 and the average family size was 2.73.

In the city, the population was spread out, with 20.1% under the age of 18, 6.7% from 18 to 24, 22.8% from 25 to 44, 21.9% from 45 to 64, and 28.4% who were 65 years of age or older. The median age was 45 years. For every 100 females, there were 95.6 males. For every 100 females age 18 and over, there were 92.2 males.

The median income for a household in the city was $35,104, and the median income for a family was $44,931. Males had a median income of $29,327 versus $21,250 for females. The per capita income for the city was $18,094. About 2.4% of families and 5.8% of the population were below the poverty line, including 6.5% of those under age 18 and 8.6% of those age 65 or over.
