= Harris–Lake Park Community School District =

Public school district in Lake Park, Iowa, United States

Location
- Lake Park, Iowa Dickinson and Osceola counties United States
- Coordinates: 43.4458°N 95.3228°W

District information
- Type: Local school district
- Grades: K–12
- Superintendent: Greg Hiemstra
- Schools: 2
- Budget: $5,034,000 (2020-21)
- NCES District ID: 1916140

Students and staff
- Students: 332 (2022-23)
- Teachers: 26.24 FTE
- Staff: 26.52 FTE
- Student–teacher ratio: 12.65
- Athletic conference: War Eagle
- District mascot: Wolves
- Colors: Blue and white

Other information
- Website: harris-lp.k12.ia.us

The Harris–Lake Park Community School District, or Harris–Lake Park Schools, is a rural public school district headquartered in Lake Park, Iowa.

The district is spans northwestern Dickinson County and northeastern Osceola County. It serves the Lake Park, Harris, and the surrounding rural areas.

The school mascot is the Wolf, and their colors are blue and white.

Andy Irwin has been the superintendent since 2017.

== Schools ==
The district operates two schools in Lake Park:

- Harris–Lake Park Elementary School
- Harris–Lake Park High School

=== Harris–Lake Park High School ===
==== Athletics ====
The Wolves compete in the War Eagle Conference in the following sports:

- Football
- Cross country
- Volleyball
- Basketball
- Golf
  - Boys' 2019 class 1A state champions
- Baseball
- Softball

The students from Harris–Lake Park can also participate in the following sports as Spirit Lake Park–Okoboji:

- Soccer
- Tennis
- Track and field
- Wrestling

== See also ==
- List of school districts in Iowa
- List of high schools in Iowa
