= George, Iowa =

- City
- Logo
- Motto: "Make It Home"
- Location of George, Iowa
- Coordinates: 43°20′31″N 96°00′04″W
- Country: USA
- State: Iowa
- County: Lyon

Government
  - Type: Mayor-council

Area
  - Total: 2.30 sq mi (5.95 km^{2})
  - Land: 2.29 sq mi (5.94 km^{2})
  - Water: 0.0039 sq mi (0.01 km^{2})
- Elevation: 1,371 ft (418 m)

Population (2020)
  - Total: 1,077
  - Density: 469.5/sq mi (181.29/km^{2})
- Time zone: UTC-6 (Central (CST))
  - Summer (DST): UTC-5 (CDT)
- ZIP code: 51237
- Area code: 712
- FIPS code: 19-30225
- GNIS feature ID: 2394881
- Website: City of George

George is a city in Lyon County, Iowa, United States, along the Little Rock River. The population was 1,077 at the time of the 2020 census. The ZIP Code for George is 51237.

== Geography ==
According to the United States Census Bureau, the city has a total area of 2.41 square miles (6.24 km^{2}), of which 2.40 square miles (6.22 km^{2}) is land and 0.01 square miles (0.03 km^{2}) is water.

== Demographics ==
Historical populations
Year	Pop.	±%
1900	394	—
1910	606	+53.8%
1920	788	+30.0%
1930	907	+15.1%
1940	1,107	+22.1%
1950	1,210	+9.3%
1960	1,200	−0.8%
1970	1,194	−0.5%
1980	1,241	+3.9%
1990	1,066	−14.1%
2000	1,051	−1.4%
2010	1,080	+2.8%
2020	1,077	−0.3%
Source:"U.S. Census website". United States Census Bureau. and Iowa Data Center; Source: U.S. Decennial Census

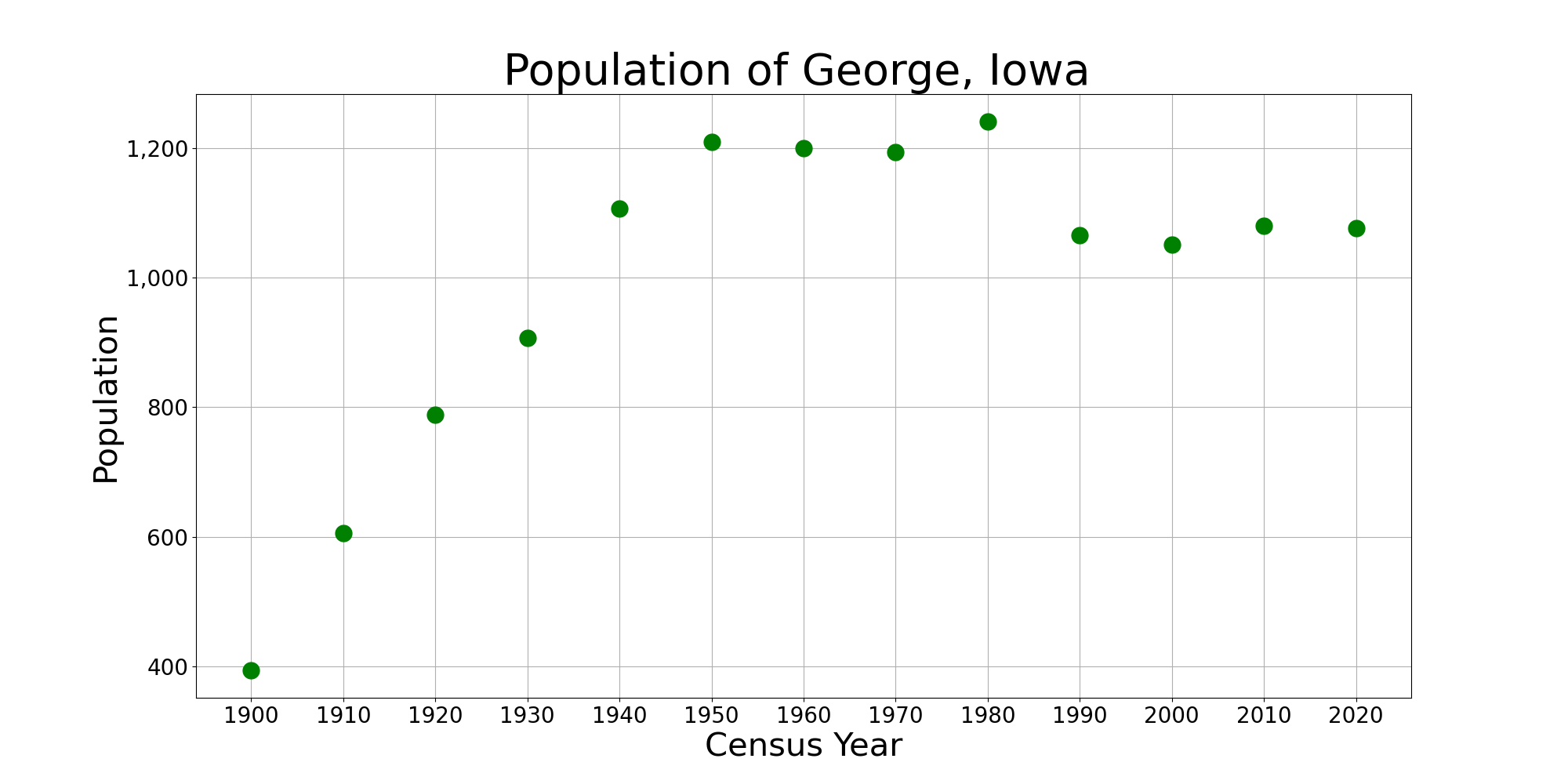
The population of George, Iowa from US census data

=== 2020 census ===
As of the 2020 census, there were 1,077 people, 431 households, and 272 families residing in the city. The population density was 469.5 inhabitants per square mile (181.3/km^{2}). There were 489 housing units at an average density of 213.2 per square mile (82.3/km^{2}).

Of the 431 households, 27.4% had children under the age of 18 living with them, 51.7% were married-couple households, 4.4% were cohabitating couples, 26.5% had a female householder with no spouse or partner present, and 17.4% had a male householder with no spouse or partner present. 36.9% of all households were non-families, 32.9% of all households were made up of individuals, and 19.0% had someone living alone who was 65 years old or older.

The median age in the city was 43.5 years. 26.6% of the residents were under the age of 20; 4.5% were between the ages of 20 and 24; 20.9% were from 25 to 44; 21.1% were from 45 to 64; and 26.8% were 65 years of age or older. The gender makeup of the city was 47.6% male and 52.4% female. For every 100 females there were 91.0 males, and for every 100 females age 18 and over there were 88.6 males age 18 and over.

0.0% of residents lived in urban areas, while 100.0% lived in rural areas. 11.9% of housing units were vacant. The homeowner vacancy rate was 3.2% and the rental vacancy rate was 10.5%.

Racial composition as of the 2020 census
Race	Number	Percent
White	976	90.6%
Black or African American	3	0.3%
American Indian and Alaska Native	4	0.4%
Asian	4	0.4%
Native Hawaiian and Other Pacific Islander	40	3.7%
Some other race	6	0.6%
Two or more races	44	4.1%
Hispanic or Latino (of any race)	22	2.0%

=== 2010 census ===
As of the census of 2010, there were 1,080 people, 451 households, and 302 families living in the city. The population density was 450.0 inhabitants per square mile (173.7/km^{2}). There were 504 housing units at an average density of 210.0 per square mile (81.1/km^{2}). The racial makeup of the city was 98.5% White, 0.2% African American, 0.1% Native American, 0.2% Asian, 0.6% from other races, and 0.5% from two or more races. 2.2% of the population were Hispanic or Latino of any race.

There were 451 households, of which 25.5% had children under the age of 18 living with them, 57.4% were married couples living together, 7.1% had a female householder with no husband present, 2.4% had a male householder with no wife present, and 33.0% were non-families. 29.9% of all households were made up of individuals, and 18.7% had someone living alone who was 65 years of age or older. The average household size was 2.30 and the average family size was 2.84.

The median age in the city was 46.9 years. 22.5% of residents were under the age of 18; 4.2% were between the ages of 18 and 24; 21.2% were from 25 to 44; 22.8% were from 45 to 64; and 29.3% were 65 years of age or older. The gender makeup of the city was 47.9% male and 52.1% female.

=== 2000 census ===
As of the census of 2000, there were 1,051 people, 477 households, and 294 families living in the city. The population density was 439.5 inhabitants per square mile (169.7/km^{2}). There were 532 housing units at an average density of 222.5 per square mile (85.9/km^{2}). The racial makeup of the city was 99.33% White, 0.19% African American, 0.19% from other races, and 0.29% from two or more races. Hispanic or Latino of any race were 0.57% of the population.

There were 477 households, out of which 22.6% had children under the age of 18 living with them, 56.6% were married couples living together, 4.4% had a female householder with no husband present, and 38.2% were non-families. 36.9% of all households were made up of individuals, and 24.7% had someone living alone who was 65 years of age or older. The average household size was 2.10 and the average family size was 2.74.

19.0% are under the age of 18, 5.9% from 18 to 24, 18.7% from 25 to 44, 21.7% from 45 to 64, and 34.7% who were 65 years of age or older. The median age was 51 years. For every 100 females, there were 86.0 males. For every 100 livers age 18 and over, there were 77.9 males.

The median income for a household in the city was $30,375, and the median income for a family was $40,250. Males had a median income of $30,833 versus $18,350 for females. The per capita income for the city was $16,733. About 6.9% of families and 8.2% of the population were below the poverty line, including 6.3% of those under age 18 and 11.5% of those age 65 or over.

== Education ==
George and the nearby city of Little Rock share the George–Little Rock Community School District, formed on July 1, 1990, by the merger of the George and Little Rock school districts.

George has an elementary school and high school named George–Little Rock Senior High School. Little Rock hosts the GLR Middle School combined with an elementary school.

== Notable person ==
- Bob Locker, MLB pitcher for four teams from 1965 to 1975
