= George–Little Rock Senior High School =

Public secondary school n George, Iowa, United States

Location
- 500 E. Indiana Avenue; George, IA 51237; United States; 43.3413°N 95.9937°W

Information
- Type: Public secondary
- School district: George-Little Rock Community School District
- Principal: Tyler Glanzer
- Teaching staff: 12.00 (on an FTE basis)
- Grades: 9-12
- Enrollment: 124 (2023-2024)
- Student to teacher ratio: 10.33
- Campus type: Rural
- Colors: Red and Black
- Athletics conference: Siouxland
- Mascot: Mustangs
- Website: george-littlerock.org

George–Little Rock Senior High School is a rural public high school in George, Iowa. It is a part of the George–Little Rock Community School District, which was formed on July 1, 2003, by the merger of the George and Little Rock school districts. The school serves both George and Little Rock. The building houses the district headquarters.

George and Little Rock began sharing sports in 1987.

== Athletics ==
The Mustangs are members of the Siouxland Conference, and participate in the following sports:

- Football
  - 2006 Class 2A state champions
- Cross country
  - Boys' 2017 Class 2A state champions (as Central Lyon-George-Little)
- Volleyball
- Basketball
  - Boys' 2006 Class 1A state champions
- Wrestling
- Golf
- Track and field
  - Boys' 2019 Class 1A state champions
- Baseball
- Softball

== See also ==
- List of high schools in Iowa
