= Hartley–Melvin–Sanborn High School =

Public secondary school in Hartley, Iowa, United States

Location
- 300 N. 8th Ave W. Hartley, Iowa 51346; United States; 43.186°N 95.485°W

Information
- Type: Public secondary
- Motto: The mission of the H-M-S Community School District is to nurture and prepare students to become responsible citizens, equipped to meet the challenges of an ever-changing world.
- School district: Hartley–Melvin–Sanborn Community School District
- Superintendent: Patrick Carlin
- Principal: Tenee Jessen
- Teaching staff: 19.03 (FTE)
- Grades: 9–12
- Enrollment: 208 (2023-2024)
- Student to teacher ratio: 10.93
- Colors: Maroon and Gold
- Athletics conference: War Eagle
- Mascot: Hawk
- Website: hmscsdia.sites.thrillshare.com/page/high-school

The Hartley–Melvin–Sanborn High School is a rural public high school located in Hartley, Iowa. It is part of the Hartley–Melvin–Sanborn Community School District. The school's mascot is the Hawk and athletic competitions take place in the War Eagle Conference.

== Athletics ==
The Hawks compete in the following sports in the War Eagle Conference:

- Cross country
- Volleyball
- Football
- Basketball
- Wrestling
- Track and field
- Golf
- Baseball
- Softball

== See also ==
- List of high schools in Iowa
