= Iowa Highway 60 =

Highway in Iowa

Iowa Highway 60
- Iowa 60 highlighted in red

Route information
- Maintained by Iowa DOT
- Length: 58.771 mi (94.583 km)
- Existed: January 1, 1969–present

Major junctions
- South end: US 75 / US 75 Bus. at Le Mars
- US 18 near Sheldon; Iowa 9 near Sibley
- North end: MN 60 near Bigelow, MN

Location
- Country: United States
- State: Iowa
- Counties: Plymouth; Sioux; O'Brien; Osceola

Highway system
- Iowa Primary Highway System; Interstate; US; State; Secondary; Scenic
← US 59	→ US 61
← Iowa 32	Iowa 33	→ US 34

Iowa Highway 60 (Iowa 60) is a north–south state highway in northwest Iowa. The highway runs at a southwest-to-northeast angle. The southern end of Iowa Highway 60 is near Le Mars at a freeway interchange with U.S. Highway 75 and U.S. Highway 75 Business. Its northern end is at the Minnesota border just south of Bigelow, Minnesota, where the highway continues in Minnesota as Minnesota State Highway 60.

The highway was designated on January 1, 1969, when it replaced Iowa 33. It was renumbered to provide a continuous number across the state line into Minnesota. Since 2004, the highway has been upgraded to expressway status, with some freeway sections, as part of a highway corridor connecting Sioux City with the Twin Cities metropolitan area in Minnesota.

== Route description ==
Iowa 60 begins north of Le Mars at an interchange with U.S. Highway 75 (US 75) and its business loop. Northbound Iowa 60 is a continuation of northbound US 75, while northbound US 75 traffic must exit to continue on that route. Iowa 60 heads to the northeast adjacent to the Floyd River along a four-lane expressway. Over its first 13 miles (21 km), it passes the small town of Seney and acres (hectares) of farmland until it reaches Alton.

It continues northeast, bypassing Hospers and Sheldon. On the Sheldon bypass, it meets U.S. Highway 18. It proceeds north and bypasses Ashton, then continues northeast to bypass Sibley, where it meets Iowa Highway 9. The highway continues northeasterly until ending at the Minnesota border just south of Bigelow, Minnesota.

== Exit list ==
County	Location	mi	km	Exit	Destinations	Notes
Plymouth	America Township	0.000	0.000	120	US 75 / US 75 Bus. south – Le Mars, Sioux City, Sioux Center	Freeway continuation past interchange; exit number is based on US 75 exit numbering
Sioux	Nassau Township	13.317	21.432	12	Alton	
Sioux	Alton	16.201	26.073	16	To Iowa 10 – Alton, Orange City	Access via unsigned Iowa 450 (450th Street); serves Orange City Area Hospital
Sioux–O'Brien county line	Lynn–Carroll township line	30.754	49.494	31	Iowa 60 Business / CR L26 (2nd Avenue)	
O'Brien	Carroll Township	32.817	52.814	33	Country Club Road	
O'Brien	Sheldon	34.433	55.415	34	US 18 (Park Avenue) / Iowa 60 Business – Spencer	
Osceola	West Holman Township	48.861	78.634	48	2nd Avenue	
Osceola	East Holman Township	51.588	83.023	51	CR A22 – Sibley	Access to Osceola Community Hospital
Osceola	East Holman–Wilson township line	53.576	86.222	53	Iowa 9 – Rock Rapids, Spirit Lake	
Osceola	Wilson Township	58.771	94.583		MN 60 east / CSAH 2 west	Continuation east into Minnesota as MN 60
1.000 mi = 1.609 km; 1.000 km = 0.621 mi

== Related route ==
Iowa Highway 60 Business
- Location: Sheldon

Iowa Highway 60 Business serves Sheldon, following the old route of Iowa 60 north into Sheldon, then turning east on U.S. 18 to return to Iowa 60.
