= Allendorf, Iowa =

- Unincorporated Community
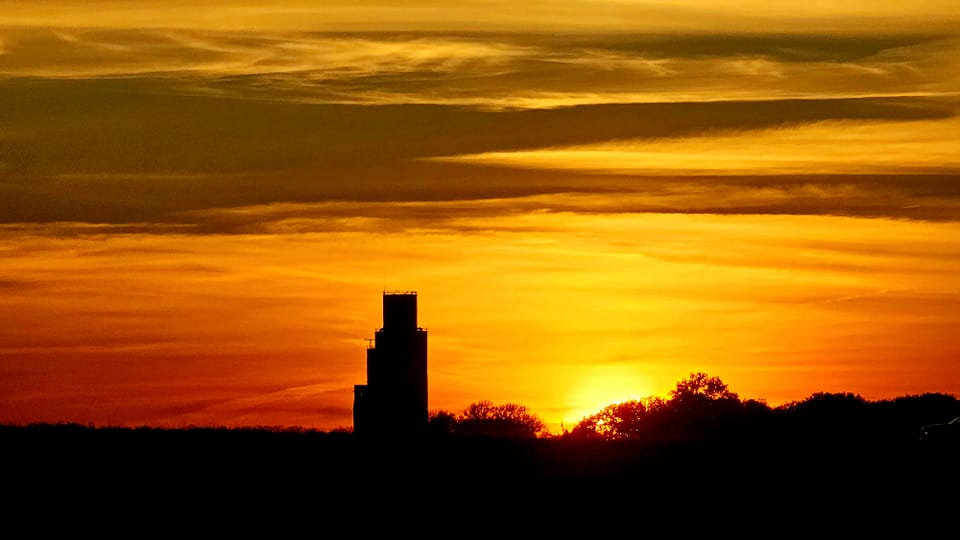
- Grain Elevator in Allendorf

- Location within Iowa Location within the United States
- Coordinates: 43°24′53″N 95°38′36″W
- Country: USA
- State: Iowa
- County: Osceola County
- Elevation: 487 m (1,598 ft)
- Time zone: UTC-6 (Central (CST))
  - Summer (DST): UTC-5 (CDT)
- Zip code: 51354
- Area code: 712
- GNIS feature ID: 454138

Allendorf is an unincorporated community in Osceola County, Iowa, United States.

== Geography ==
It is located on Highway 59, five miles east of Sibley, adjacent to the Johnson Wilderness Area.

== History ==
Allendorf was founded in 1895, possibly named after a town named Allendorf in Germany; the town was originally named Oliver. Allendorf was founded on the Rock Island Railroad line in sections 11 and 12 of East Holman Township.

Allendorf's population was 13 in 1900, and 35 in 1925. The population was 60 in 1940.

== See also ==
- Cloverdale, Iowa
