= Harrison Township, Osceola County, Iowa =

Township in Osceola County, Iowa, U.S.

Coordinates: 43.299°N 95.447°W

Harrison Township is a township in Osceola County, Iowa, United States. Harrison Township includes the unincorporated town of May City, Iowa. The Ocheyedan River flows through Harrison Township.

== History ==
Harrison Township was founded in 1888.
