= Ocheyedan =

Ocheyedan may refer to a place in the United States:

- Ocheyedan, Iowa
- Ocheyedan River, in Minnesota and Iowa
