= Osceola County Courthouse =

Osceola County Courthouse can refer to multiple county courthouses:

- Osceola County Courthouse (Florida)
- Osceola County Courthouse (Iowa)
