= Gilman Township, Osceola County, Iowa =

Township in Osceola County, Iowa, U.S.

Coordinates: 43.302°N 95.802°W

Gilman Township is a township in Osceola County, Iowa, United States. The city of Ashton is located in Gilman Township.

== History ==
Gilman Township was founded in 1884.
