= 1924 United States presidential election in Iowa =

- November 4, 1924

Nominee	Calvin Coolidge	Robert M. La Follette	John W. Davis
Party	Republican	Progressive	Democratic
Home state	Massachusetts	Wisconsin	West Virginia
Running mate	Charles G. Dawes	Burton K. Wheeler	Charles W. Bryan
Electoral vote	13	0	0
Popular vote	537,458	274,448	160,382
Percentage	55.02%	28.10%	16.42%
County results
Coolidge
40–50%
50–60%
60–70%
La Follette
40–50%
President before election
Calvin Coolidge
Republican
Elected President
Calvin Coolidge
Republican

The 1924 United States presidential election in Iowa took place on November 4, 1924, as part of the 1924 United States presidential election which was held throughout all contemporary 48 states. Voters chose 13 representatives, or electors to the Electoral College, who voted for president and vice president.

Iowa voted for the Republican nominee, incumbent President Calvin Coolidge of Massachusetts, over Progressive nominee, Wisconsin Senator Robert M. La Follette and Democratic nominee, Ambassador John W. Davis of West Virginia. Coolidge ran with former Budget Director Charles G. Dawes of Illinois, while Davis ran with Governor Charles W. Bryan of Nebraska while La Follette ran with Montana Senator Burton K. Wheeler.

Iowa was the most southeasterly of 12 states where Democrat Davis ran third behind both Coolidge and La Follette. Davis’ performance is the worst by any major-party nominee since Iowa became a state in 1846, whilst La Follette's is the second-best by any third-party candidate in Iowa presidential election history behind Theodore Roosevelt in 1912.

== Results ==
Presidential Candidate	Running Mate	Party	Electoral Vote (EV)	Popular Vote (PV)	
Calvin Coolidge of Massachusetts	Charles G. Dawes	Republican	13	537,458	55.02%
Robert M. La Follette	Burton K. Wheeler	Progressive	0	274,448	28.10%
John W. Davis	Charles W. Bryan	Democratic	0	160,382	16.42%
William Z. Foster	Benjamin Gitlow	Communist	0	4,037	0.41%
—	—	Write-ins	0	445	0.05%

=== Results by county ===
County	John Calvin Coolidge Republican		John William Davis Democratic		Robert Marion La Follette Sr. Progressive		William Z. Foster Communist		Various candidates Write-ins		Margin (Note: Because La Follette finished ahead of Davis in Iowa as a whole, all margins given are Coolidge vote minus La Follette vote and all percentage margins Coolidge percentage minus La Follette percentage unless otherwise stated for the county in question.)		Total votes cast
County	#	%	#	%	#	%	#	%	#	%	#	%	Total votes cast
Adair	4,043	67.29%	688	11.45%	1,275	21.22%	2	0.03%			2,768	46.07%	6,008
Adams	2,547	54.28%	897	19.12%	1,247	26.58%	1	0.02%			1,300	27.71%	4,692
Allamakee	2,755	38.40%	1,289	17.97%	3,110	43.34%	17	0.24%	4	0.06%	-355	-4.95%	7,175
Appanoose	6,421	57.14%	2,032	18.08%	2,722	24.22%	56	0.50%	7	0.06%	3,699	32.92%	11,238
Audubon	2,475	53.86%	965	21.00%	1,152	25.07%	1	0.02%	2	0.04%	1,323	28.79%	4,595
Benton	5,314	58.13%	1,459	15.96%	2,329	25.48%	36	0.39%	4	0.04%	2,985	32.65%	9,142
Black Hawk	15,813	65.29%	2,981	12.31%	5,397	22.28%	21	0.09%	9	0.04%	10,416	43.00%	24,221
Boone	4,980	45.57%	702	6.42%	4,953	45.32%	286	2.62%	7	0.06%	27	0.25%	10,928
Bremer	3,532	48.32%	911	12.46%	2,859	39.11%	7	0.10%	1	0.01%	673	9.21%	7,310
Buchanan	5,459	63.10%	1,780	20.58%	1,409	16.29%	3	0.03%			3,679 (Note: In this county where Davis did run second ahead of La Follette, margin given is Coolidge vote minus Davis vote and percentage margin Coolidge percentage minus Davis percentage.)	42.53%	8,651
Buena Vista	3,812	52.38%	683	9.39%	2,771	38.08%	2	0.03%	9	0.12%	1,041	14.31%	7,277
Butler	3,823	59.57%	667	10.39%	1,921	29.93%	6	0.09%	1	0.02%	1,902	29.64%	6,418
Calhoun	3,529	53.21%	714	10.77%	2,358	35.55%	31	0.47%			1,171	17.66%	6,632
Carroll	3,590	41.06%	1,994	22.80%	3,159	36.13%	1	0.01%			431	4.93%	8,744
Cass	5,721	68.70%	1,099	13.20%	1,488	17.87%	5	0.06%	15	0.18%	4,233	50.83%	8,328
Cedar	4,625	60.74%	1,478	19.41%	1,510	19.83%	1	0.01%	1	0.01%	3,115	40.91%	7,615
Cerro Gordo	8,410	58.85%	1,345	9.41%	4,514	31.59%	18	0.13%	4	0.03%	3,896	27.26%	14,291
Cherokee	3,240	52.29%	904	14.59%	2,028	32.73%	12	0.19%	12	0.19%	1,212	19.56%	6,196
Chickasaw	3,416	46.50%	1,736	23.63%	2,188	29.78%	4	0.05%	3	0.04%	1,228	16.71%	7,347
Clarke	2,554	52.48%	743	15.27%	1,563	32.11%	6	0.12%	1	0.02%	991	20.36%	4,867
Clay	3,549	60.95%	378	6.49%	1,853	31.82%	40	0.69%	3	0.05%	1,696	29.13%	5,823
Clayton	4,168	41.48%	1,556	15.48%	4,314	42.93%	9	0.09%	2	0.02%	-146	-1.45%	10,049
Clinton	10,359	52.68%	3,811	19.38%	5,466	27.80%	16	0.08%	13	0.07%	4,893	24.88%	19,665
Crawford	2,882	36.26%	1,255	15.79%	3,638	45.77%	165	2.08%	9	0.11%	-756	-9.51%	7,949
Dallas	6,359	61.97%	933	9.09%	2,959	28.84%	6	0.06%	4	0.04%	3,400	33.14%	10,261
Davis	2,804	48.76%	1,802	31.33%	1,142	19.86%	2	0.03%	1	0.02%	1,002	17.42%	5,751
Decatur	3,221	47.13%	1,693	24.77%	1,917	28.05%	4	0.06%			1,304	19.08%	6,835
Delaware	4,938	64.68%	1,146	15.01%	1,546	20.25%	4	0.05%	1	0.01%	3,392	44.43%	7,635
Des Moines	7,995	53.98%	2,616	17.66%	4,128	27.87%	59	0.40%	12	0.08%	3,867	26.11%	14,810
Dickinson	2,967	66.18%	435	9.70%	1,017	22.69%	63	1.41%	1	0.02%	1,950	43.50%	4,483
Dubuque	8,280	32.77%	5,718	22.63%	10,568	41.83%	668	2.64%	33	0.13%	-2,288	-9.06%	25,267
Emmet	2,739	53.26%	407	7.91%	1,987	38.64%	7	0.14%	3	0.06%	752	14.62%	5,143
Fayette	5,974	50.21%	1,272	10.69%	4,634	38.95%	15	0.13%	3	0.03%	1,340	11.26%	11,898
Floyd	5,012	66.00%	529	6.97%	2,048	26.97%	4	0.05%	1	0.01%	2,964	39.03%	7,594
Franklin	3,064	58.74%	360	6.90%	1,704	32.67%	83	1.59%	5	0.10%	1,360	26.07%	5,216
Fremont	3,313	53.24%	2,525	40.58%	382	6.14%	2	0.03%	1	0.02%	788	12.66%	6,223
Greene	4,599	66.76%	790	11.47%	1,497	21.73%	2	0.03%	1	0.01%	3,102	45.03%	6,889
Grundy	3,322	57.84%	615	10.71%	1,801	31.36%	4	0.07%	1	0.02%	1,521	26.48%	5,743
Guthrie	4,314	60.06%	840	11.69%	2,027	28.22%	2	0.03%			2,287	31.84%	7,183
Hamilton	4,401	60.74%	490	6.76%	2,348	32.40%	4	0.06%	3	0.04%	2,053	28.33%	7,246
Hancock	3,183	59.62%	550	10.30%	1,605	30.06%	1	0.02%			1,578	29.56%	5,339
Hardin	4,714	59.51%	634	8.00%	2,485	31.37%	79	1.00%	9	0.11%	2,229	28.14%	7,921
Harrison	5,062	51.01%	3,179	32.03%	1,674	16.87%	7	0.07%	2	0.02%	1,883	18.97%	9,924
Henry	4,536	62.17%	1,344	18.42%	1,413	19.37%	0	0.00%	3	0.04%	3,123	42.80%	7,296
Howard	2,850	47.67%	1,604	26.83%	1,521	25.44%	4	0.07%			1,246	20.84%	5,979
Humboldt	2,841	59.71%	370	7.78%	1,543	32.43%	3	0.06%	1	0.02%	1,298	27.28%	4,758
Ida	2,033	43.46%	685	14.64%	1,956	41.81%	4	0.09%			77	1.65%	4,678
Iowa	3,549	51.91%	1,458	21.33%	1,806	26.42%	22	0.32%	2	0.03%	1,743	25.49%	6,837
Jackson	4,218	50.20%	2,352	27.99%	1,755	20.89%	73	0.87%	5	0.06%	1,866	22.21%	8,403
Jasper	6,565	56.81%	1,214	10.50%	3,764	32.57%	10	0.09%	4	0.03%	2,801	24.24%	11,557
Jefferson	4,062	61.61%	1,249	18.94%	1,279	19.40%	0	0.00%	3	0.05%	2,783	42.21%	6,593
Johnson	5,741	44.53%	4,570	35.45%	2,553	19.80%	17	0.13%	10	0.08%	1,171	9.08%	12,891
Jones	4,524	57.14%	2,212	27.94%	1,182	14.93%	0	0.00%			2,312	29.20%	7,918
Keokuk	4,795	51.36%	2,568	27.51%	1,966	21.06%	4	0.04%	3	0.03%	2,227	23.85%	9,336
Kossuth	3,806	43.51%	1,369	15.65%	3,562	40.72%	5	0.06%	5	0.06%	244	2.79%	8,747
Lee	9,999	54.41%	4,903	26.68%	3,448	18.76%	16	0.09%	11	0.06%	5,096	27.73%	18,377
Linn	22,371	64.49%	5,941	17.13%	6,335	18.26%	24	0.07%	19	0.05%	16,036	46.23%	34,690
Louisa	2,952	64.89%	643	14.13%	945	20.77%	4	0.09%	5	0.11%	2,007	44.12%	4,549
Lucas	3,288	52.64%	824	13.19%	2,130	34.10%	4	0.06%			1,158	18.54%	6,246
Lyon	2,082	43.99%	481	10.16%	2,162	45.68%	6	0.13%	2	0.04%	-80	-1.69%	4,733
Madison	4,191	60.80%	1,367	19.83%	1,330	19.29%	3	0.04%	2	0.03%	2,824	40.97%	6,893
Mahaska	5,810	55.11%	1,673	15.87%	3,010	28.55%	46	0.44%	4	0.04%	2,800	26.56%	10,543
Marion	5,058	47.65%	2,383	22.45%	3,154	29.71%	16	0.15%	4	0.04%	1,904	17.94%	10,615
Marshall	9,010	68.09%	1,516	11.46%	2,584	19.53%	116	0.88%	7	0.05%	6,426	48.56%	13,233
Mills	3,348	57.38%	1,750	29.99%	727	12.46%	7	0.12%	3	0.05%	1,598	27.39%	5,835
Mitchell	2,892	46.93%	400	6.49%	2,858	46.37%	13	0.21%			34	0.55%	6,163
Monona	3,195	50.94%	1,271	20.26%	1,802	28.73%	3	0.05%	1	0.02%	1,393	22.21%	6,272
Monroe	4,098	50.92%	1,388	17.25%	2,514	31.24%	41	0.51%	7	0.09%	1,584	19.68%	8,048
Montgomery	4,617	64.51%	805	11.25%	1,732	24.20%	1	0.01%	2	0.03%	2,885	40.31%	7,157
Muscatine	7,731	64.87%	1,963	16.47%	2,091	17.55%	119	1.00%	13	0.11%	5,640	47.33%	11,917
O'Brien	4,172	58.47%	756	10.60%	2,200	30.83%	6	0.08%	1	0.01%	1,972	27.64%	7,135
Osceola	1,876	50.42%	386	10.37%	1,454	39.08%	4	0.11%	1	0.03%	422	11.34%	3,721
Page	6,023	65.58%	1,643	17.89%	1,511	16.45%	2	0.02%	5	0.05%	4,380	47.69%	9,184
Palo Alto	2,943	49.49%	593	9.97%	2,393	40.24%	17	0.29%	1	0.02%	550	9.25%	5,947
Plymouth	3,803	42.09%	1,605	17.76%	3,628	40.15%	0	0.00%			175	1.94%	9,036
Pocahontas	2,537	39.65%	819	12.80%	2,934	45.86%	105	1.64%	3	0.05%	-397	-6.21%	6,398
Polk	37,491	62.21%	6,665	11.06%	15,567	25.83%	513	0.85%	34	0.06%	21,924	36.38%	60,270
Pottawattamie	13,380	52.78%	5,305	20.93%	6,637	26.18%	23	0.09%	7	0.03%	6,743	26.60%	25,352
Poweshiek	4,414	53.57%	1,428	17.33%	2,379	28.87%	12	0.15%	6	0.07%	2,035	24.70%	8,239
Ringgold	3,147	60.68%	882	17.01%	1,157	22.31%	0	0.00%			1,990	38.37%	5,186
Sac	3,970	60.65%	674	10.30%	1,889	28.86%	12	0.18%	1	0.02%	2,081	31.79%	6,546
Scott	18,360	60.32%	4,347	14.28%	7,487	24.60%	226	0.74%	18	0.06%	10,873	35.72%	30,438
Shelby	3,252	47.96%	2,297	33.88%	1,201	17.71%	28	0.41%	2	0.03%	955	14.09%	6,780
Sioux	4,960	58.91%	900	10.69%	2,556	30.36%	3	0.04%	1	0.01%	2,404	28.55%	8,420
Story	6,916	63.06%	1,310	11.94%	2,554	23.29%	184	1.68%	4	0.04%	4,362	39.77%	10,968
Tama	5,177	55.27%	2,180	23.27%	2,003	21.38%	0	0.00%	7	0.07%	2,997	32.00%	9,367
Taylor	4,254	60.95%	1,138	16.30%	1,579	22.62%	8	0.11%	1	0.01%	2,675	38.32%	6,980
Union	4,250	54.15%	1,166	14.86%	2,425	30.90%	4	0.05%	3	0.04%	1,825	23.25%	7,848
Van Buren	3,623	60.69%	1,209	20.25%	1,132	18.96%	4	0.07%	2	0.03%	2,414	40.44%	5,970
Wapello	9,870	56.96%	3,039	17.54%	4,398	25.38%	15	0.09%	7	0.04%	5,472	31.58%	17,329
Warren	4,683	62.08%	1,274	16.89%	1,579	20.93%	4	0.05%	3	0.04%	3,104	41.15%	7,543
Washington	5,053	60.31%	1,868	22.30%	1,450	17.31%	5	0.06%	2	0.02%	3,185	38.02%	8,378
Wayne	3,322	49.97%	1,826	27.47%	1,486	22.35%	11	0.17%	3	0.05%	1,496	22.50%	6,648
Webster	6,641	46.00%	2,076	14.38%	5,279	36.56%	430	2.98%	12	0.08%	1,362	9.43%	14,438
Winnebago	2,445	47.27%	225	4.35%	2,497	48.28%	5	0.10%			-52	-1.01%	5,172
Winneshiek	4,154	43.96%	1,510	15.98%	3,763	39.82%	20	0.21%	3	0.03%	391	4.14%	9,450
Woodbury	16,639	47.38%	5,676	16.16%	12,719	36.22%	73	0.21%	12	0.03%	3,920	11.16%	35,119
Worth	2,340	50.97%	180	3.92%	2,069	45.07%	0	0.00%	2	0.04%	271	5.90%	4,591
Wright	4,323	57.40%	501	6.65%	2,707	35.94%	0	0.00%			1,616	21.46%	7,531
Totals	537,458	55.02%	160,382	16.42%	274,448	28.10%	4,037	0.41%	445	0.05%	263,010	26.93%	976,770

== See also ==
- United States presidential elections in Iowa
