= Baker Township, Osceola County, Iowa =

Township in Osceola County, Iowa, U.S.

Coordinates: 43.3005°N 95.5647°W

Baker Township is a township in Osceola County, Iowa, United States. The city of Melvin is located in Baker Township. It has a population of 474.

== History ==
Baker Township was founded in 1875.
