= Ocheyedan Township, Osceola County, Iowa =

Township in Iowa, USA

Coordinates: 43.3877°N 95.5646°W

Ocheyedan Township is a township in Osceola County, Iowa, United States.
