= Sibley–Ocheyedan Community School District =

Public school district in Sibley, Iowa, United States

Coordinates: 43.404724°N 95.735640°W

Location
- Sibley, Iowa Osceola County United States
- Coordinates: 43.404724, -95.735640

District information
- Type: Local school district
- Grades: K-12
- Established: 1985
- Superintendent: Stan De Zeeuw
- Schools: 3
- Budget: $11,219,000 (2020-21)
- NCES District ID: 1900015

Students and staff
- Students: 769 (2022-23)
- Teachers: 59.02 FTE
- Staff: 68.24 FTE
- Student–teacher ratio: 12.35
- Athletic conference: Siouxland (Currently Applying to War Eagle Conference)
- District mascot: Generals
- Colors: Orange and Black

Other information
- Website: thegenerals2.socsdit.org

Sibley–Ocheyedan Community School District (SOCSD) is a rural public school district headquartered in Sibley, Iowa. The district, entirely in Osceola County, serves Sibley and Ocheyedan.

The district formed on July 1, 1985, as a merger of the Sibley and Ocheyedan school districts.

== Schools ==
All schools are in Sibley.

- Sibley–Ocheyedan High School (grades 7–12) - As of 2020 it had about 40 employees and 350 students.
- Sibley–Ocheyedan Middle School (grades 5–8)
- Sibley–Ocheyedan Elementary School (K-4)

It previously operated two separate elementary schools: Ben Franklin Elementary School and Ocheyedan Elementary School. The district closed the latter school in 2009. A reduction in the number of students was the reason for the closure. By 2014, the district was trying to find another use for the building.

=== Sibley–Ocheyedan High School ===
==== Athletics ====
The Generals are members of the War Eagle Conference, and participate in the following sports:

- Football
  - 1978 Class 2A State Champions
- Cross Country
  - Girls' 1997 Class 2A State Champions
  - Girls' 2022 Class 1A 3rd Place Finish at State
- Volleyball
- Basketball
  - Girls' 2-time State Champions (1986, 1996)
- Wrestling
- Golf
  - Boys' 3-time State Champions (1977, 1978, 2013)
  - Girls' 2-time Class 1A State Champions (1984, 1985)
- Track and Field
- Baseball
- Softball

== See also ==
- List of school districts in Iowa
- List of high schools in Iowa
