= 1940 United States presidential election in Iowa =

- November 5, 1940

All 11 Iowa votes to the Electoral College

Nominee	Wendell Willkie	Franklin D. Roosevelt
Party	Republican	Democratic
Home state	New York	New York
Running mate	Charles L. McNary	Henry A. Wallace
Electoral vote	11	0
Popular vote	632,370	578,800
Percentage	52.03%	47.62%
County results
Willkie
40–50%
50–60%
60–70%
Roosevelt
40–50%
50–60%
President before election
Franklin D. Roosevelt
Democratic
Elected President
Franklin D. Roosevelt
Democratic

The 1940 United States presidential election in Iowa took place on November 5, 1940, as part of the 1940 United States presidential election. Iowa voters chose 11 representatives, or electors, to the Electoral College, who voted for president and vice president.

Iowa was won by Wendell Willkie (R–New York), running with Minority Leader Charles L. McNary, with 52.03% of the popular vote, against incumbent President Franklin D. Roosevelt (D–New York), running with Secretary Henry A. Wallace (who resided in Iowa), with 47.62% of the popular vote.

== Results ==
1940 United States presidential election in Iowa
Party	Candidate	Votes	%
Republican	Wendell Willkie	632,370	52.03%
Democratic	Franklin D. Roosevelt (inc.)	578,800	47.62%
Prohibition	Roger W. Babson	2,284	0.19%
Communist	Earl R. Browder	1,524	0.13%
Socialist Labor	John W. Aiken	452	0.04%
Total votes		1,215,430	100%

=== Results by county ===
County	Wendell Lewis Willkie Republican		Franklin Delano Roosevelt Democratic		Roger Ward Babson Prohibition		Earl Russell Browder Communist		John W. Aiken Socialist Labor		Margin		Total votes cast
County	#	%	#	%	#	%	#	%	#	%	#	%	Total votes cast
Adair	3,907	58.77%	2,734	41.13%	6	0.09%	1	0.02%	0	0.00%	1,173	17.64%	6,648
Adams	3,182	60.13%	2,088	39.46%	16	0.30%	5	0.09%	1	0.02%	1,094	20.67%	5,292
Allamakee	5,840	64.02%	3,258	35.72%	5	0.05%	18	0.20%	1	0.01%	2,582	28.31%	9,122
Appanoose	6,032	49.43%	6,069	49.74%	40	0.33%	57	0.47%	4	0.03%	-37	-0.30%	12,202
Audubon	2,632	44.80%	3,236	55.08%	1	0.02%	6	0.10%	0	0.00%	-604	-10.28%	5,875
Benton	5,298	49.55%	5,363	50.15%	18	0.17%	7	0.07%	7	0.07%	-65	-0.61%	10,693
Black Hawk	17,132	49.61%	17,305	50.11%	47	0.14%	40	0.12%	8	0.02%	-173	-0.50%	34,532
Boone	5,227	41.92%	7,168	57.49%	55	0.44%	16	0.13%	3	0.02%	-1,941	-15.57%	12,469
Bremer	5,374	63.26%	3,103	36.53%	11	0.13%	6	0.07%	1	0.01%	2,271	26.73%	8,495
Buchanan	5,630	54.61%	4,649	45.10%	23	0.22%	4	0.04%	3	0.03%	981	9.52%	10,309
Buena Vista	4,576	48.69%	4,784	50.90%	29	0.31%	3	0.03%	7	0.07%	-208	-2.21%	9,399
Butler	4,848	63.56%	2,760	36.18%	12	0.16%	1	0.01%	7	0.09%	2,088	27.37%	7,628
Calhoun	3,792	46.46%	4,344	53.23%	12	0.15%	8	0.10%	5	0.06%	-552	-6.76%	8,161
Carroll	5,376	49.22%	5,526	50.59%	14	0.13%	6	0.05%	1	0.01%	-150	-1.37%	10,923
Cass	6,377	62.69%	3,763	36.99%	26	0.26%	6	0.06%	0	0.00%	2,614	25.70%	10,172
Cedar	5,521	62.45%	3,293	37.25%	10	0.11%	9	0.10%	7	0.08%	2,228	25.20%	8,840
Cerro Gordo	9,728	47.20%	10,839	52.59%	27	0.13%	15	0.07%	3	0.01%	-1,111	-5.39%	20,612
Cherokee	4,458	53.50%	3,855	46.27%	15	0.18%	3	0.04%	1	0.01%	603	7.24%	8,332
Chickasaw	4,440	52.71%	3,981	47.26%	1	0.01%	1	0.01%	0	0.00%	459	5.45%	8,423
Clarke	2,962	53.76%	2,513	45.61%	29	0.53%	5	0.09%	1	0.02%	449	8.15%	5,510
Clay	3,673	45.77%	4,328	53.93%	19	0.24%	1	0.01%	4	0.05%	-655	-8.16%	8,025
Clayton	7,443	59.86%	4,973	40.00%	10	0.08%	4	0.03%	4	0.03%	2,470	19.86%	12,434
Clinton	12,177	54.17%	10,251	45.60%	15	0.07%	17	0.08%	18	0.08%	1,926	8.57%	22,478
Crawford	5,284	55.92%	4,130	43.71%	8	0.08%	17	0.18%	10	0.11%	1,154	12.21%	9,449
Dallas	6,218	49.24%	6,279	49.72%	56	0.44%	73	0.58%	2	0.02%	-61	-0.48%	12,628
Davis	2,975	46.65%	3,374	52.91%	23	0.36%	4	0.06%	1	0.02%	-399	-6.26%	6,377
Decatur	3,494	46.91%	3,938	52.87%	9	0.12%	5	0.07%	2	0.03%	-444	-5.96%	7,448
Delaware	6,175	67.30%	2,985	32.53%	8	0.09%	6	0.07%	2	0.02%	3,190	34.76%	9,176
Des Moines	10,988	62.34%	6,578	37.32%	36	0.20%	11	0.06%	12	0.07%	4,410	25.02%	17,625
Dickinson	2,736	47.65%	2,985	51.99%	15	0.26%	3	0.05%	3	0.05%	-249	-4.34%	5,742
Dubuque	14,590	51.30%	13,805	48.54%	16	0.06%	11	0.04%	19	0.07%	785	2.76%	28,441
Emmet	3,053	49.27%	3,097	49.98%	16	0.26%	28	0.45%	3	0.05%	-44	-0.71%	6,197
Fayette	8,237	57.43%	6,066	42.30%	18	0.13%	20	0.14%	1	0.01%	2,171	15.14%	14,342
Floyd	5,829	58.11%	4,167	41.54%	22	0.22%	9	0.09%	4	0.04%	1,662	16.57%	10,031
Franklin	3,623	49.56%	3,540	48.43%	13	0.18%	130	1.78%	4	0.05%	83	1.14%	7,310
Fremont	3,825	49.27%	3,914	50.41%	18	0.23%	6	0.08%	1	0.01%	-89	-1.15%	7,764
Greene	3,920	52.22%	3,566	47.51%	13	0.17%	6	0.08%	1	0.01%	354	4.72%	7,506
Grundy	3,908	58.56%	2,745	41.13%	16	0.24%	3	0.04%	2	0.03%	1,163	17.43%	6,674
Guthrie	4,733	57.33%	3,489	42.27%	23	0.28%	7	0.08%	3	0.04%	1,244	15.07%	8,255
Hamilton	4,183	44.03%	5,279	55.56%	23	0.24%	13	0.14%	3	0.03%	-1,096	-11.54%	9,501
Hancock	3,632	50.63%	3,514	48.99%	14	0.20%	12	0.17%	1	0.01%	118	1.65%	7,173
Hardin	5,692	54.26%	4,764	45.41%	25	0.24%	4	0.04%	6	0.06%	928	8.85%	10,491
Harrison	6,094	53.33%	5,317	46.53%	10	0.09%	7	0.06%	0	0.00%	777	6.80%	11,428
Henry	5,893	67.36%	2,837	32.43%	18	0.21%	1	0.01%	0	0.00%	3,056	34.93%	8,749
Howard	3,714	50.16%	3,675	49.63%	5	0.07%	7	0.09%	4	0.05%	39	0.53%	7,405
Humboldt	2,853	46.44%	3,268	53.20%	9	0.15%	13	0.21%	0	0.00%	-415	-6.76%	6,143
Ida	3,166	57.70%	2,306	42.03%	8	0.15%	7	0.13%	0	0.00%	860	15.67%	5,487
Iowa	4,696	55.33%	3,649	42.99%	14	0.16%	120	1.41%	9	0.11%	1,047	12.34%	8,488
Jackson	5,417	56.07%	4,218	43.66%	8	0.08%	10	0.10%	8	0.08%	1,199	12.41%	9,661
Jasper	7,240	46.95%	8,129	52.71%	26	0.17%	20	0.13%	6	0.04%	-889	-5.76%	15,421
Jefferson	4,891	58.67%	3,402	40.81%	36	0.43%	5	0.06%	2	0.02%	1,489	17.86%	8,336
Johnson	7,206	44.27%	9,017	55.39%	16	0.10%	30	0.18%	9	0.06%	-1,811	-11.13%	16,278
Jones	5,630	56.70%	4,273	43.04%	10	0.10%	16	0.16%	0	0.00%	1,357	13.67%	9,929
Keokuk	5,394	54.00%	4,552	45.57%	35	0.35%	4	0.04%	3	0.03%	842	8.43%	9,988
Kossuth	5,639	46.35%	6,502	53.45%	8	0.07%	13	0.11%	3	0.02%	-863	-7.09%	12,165
Lee	10,616	53.71%	9,117	46.12%	19	0.10%	11	0.06%	3	0.02%	1,499	7.58%	19,766
Linn	23,581	54.54%	19,531	45.17%	75	0.17%	27	0.06%	21	0.05%	4,050	9.37%	43,235
Louisa	3,330	59.18%	2,247	39.93%	21	0.37%	28	0.50%	1	0.02%	1,083	19.25%	5,627
Lucas	3,806	53.24%	3,255	45.53%	33	0.46%	50	0.70%	5	0.07%	551	7.71%	7,149
Lyon	3,880	59.33%	2,648	40.49%	6	0.09%	6	0.09%	0	0.00%	1,232	18.84%	6,540
Madison	4,477	58.91%	3,094	40.71%	25	0.33%	3	0.04%	1	0.01%	1,383	18.20%	7,600
Mahaska	6,123	51.12%	5,757	48.07%	83	0.69%	7	0.06%	7	0.06%	366	3.06%	11,977
Marion	5,763	45.19%	6,915	54.22%	48	0.38%	25	0.20%	2	0.02%	-1,152	-9.03%	12,753
Marshall	8,503	56.44%	6,497	43.13%	46	0.31%	16	0.11%	3	0.02%	2,006	13.32%	15,065
Mills	3,873	57.39%	2,862	42.41%	8	0.12%	4	0.06%	2	0.03%	1,011	14.98%	6,749
Mitchell	3,947	56.49%	3,025	43.29%	11	0.16%	3	0.04%	1	0.01%	922	13.20%	6,987
Monona	4,192	46.63%	4,783	53.20%	4	0.04%	11	0.12%	0	0.00%	-591	-6.57%	8,990
Monroe	3,270	44.57%	3,994	54.44%	46	0.63%	23	0.31%	3	0.04%	-724	-9.87%	7,336
Montgomery	4,848	58.98%	3,332	40.54%	24	0.29%	15	0.18%	1	0.01%	1,516	18.44%	8,220
Muscatine	8,543	59.24%	5,825	40.39%	28	0.19%	13	0.09%	12	0.08%	2,718	18.85%	14,421
O'Brien	4,760	53.30%	4,133	46.28%	18	0.20%	19	0.21%	1	0.01%	627	7.02%	8,931
Osceola	2,425	51.14%	2,288	48.25%	9	0.19%	16	0.34%	4	0.08%	137	2.89%	4,742
Page	7,407	64.04%	4,102	35.47%	42	0.36%	10	0.09%	5	0.04%	3,305	28.58%	11,566
Palo Alto	3,322	42.47%	4,482	57.30%	13	0.17%	4	0.05%	1	0.01%	-1,160	-14.83%	7,822
Plymouth	7,725	66.72%	3,831	33.09%	14	0.12%	9	0.08%	0	0.00%	3,894	33.63%	11,579
Pocahontas	2,985	41.92%	4,118	57.83%	10	0.14%	4	0.06%	4	0.06%	-1,133	-15.91%	7,121
Polk	41,245	44.26%	51,647	55.42%	176	0.19%	77	0.08%	48	0.05%	-10,402	-11.16%	93,193
Pottawattamie	15,929	51.07%	15,221	48.80%	20	0.06%	12	0.04%	6	0.02%	708	2.27%	31,188
Poweshiek	4,773	49.66%	4,794	49.88%	32	0.33%	8	0.08%	4	0.04%	-21	-0.22%	9,611
Ringgold	3,507	59.50%	2,374	40.28%	9	0.15%	4	0.07%	0	0.00%	1,133	19.22%	5,894
Sac	4,358	53.66%	3,754	46.23%	2	0.02%	7	0.09%	0	0.00%	604	7.44%	8,121
Scott	18,504	46.69%	20,996	52.98%	59	0.15%	50	0.13%	21	0.05%	-2,492	-6.29%	39,630
Shelby	4,613	54.53%	3,811	45.05%	17	0.20%	16	0.19%	3	0.04%	802	9.48%	8,460
Sioux	7,585	64.55%	4,144	35.27%	16	0.14%	3	0.03%	2	0.02%	3,441	29.29%	11,750
Story	7,853	52.11%	7,152	47.46%	53	0.35%	9	0.06%	3	0.02%	701	4.65%	15,070
Tama	5,865	49.31%	5,996	50.42%	12	0.10%	16	0.13%	4	0.03%	-131	-1.10%	11,893
Taylor	4,420	59.56%	2,976	40.10%	19	0.26%	2	0.03%	4	0.05%	1,444	19.46%	7,421
Union	5,421	62.54%	3,229	37.25%	11	0.13%	6	0.07%	1	0.01%	2,192	25.29%	8,668
Van Buren	4,108	62.72%	2,416	36.89%	24	0.37%	2	0.03%	0	0.00%	1,692	25.83%	6,550
Wapello	9,039	43.03%	11,880	56.56%	44	0.21%	27	0.13%	16	0.08%	-2,841	-13.52%	21,006
Warren	5,016	56.21%	3,856	43.21%	31	0.35%	14	0.16%	6	0.07%	1,160	13.00%	8,923
Washington	5,649	58.11%	4,030	41.46%	29	0.30%	9	0.09%	4	0.04%	1,619	16.65%	9,721
Wayne	3,748	50.64%	3,625	48.98%	12	0.16%	12	0.16%	4	0.05%	123	1.66%	7,401
Webster	7,583	41.29%	10,731	58.43%	28	0.15%	12	0.07%	12	0.07%	-3,148	-17.14%	18,366
Winnebago	3,308	51.78%	3,051	47.76%	17	0.27%	10	0.16%	2	0.03%	257	4.02%	6,388
Winneshiek	6,208	53.35%	5,405	46.45%	12	0.10%	8	0.07%	4	0.03%	803	6.90%	11,637
Woodbury	22,832	48.19%	24,457	51.62%	33	0.07%	41	0.09%	15	0.03%	-1,625	-3.43%	47,378
Worth	2,434	44.62%	3,007	55.12%	12	0.22%	2	0.04%	0	0.00%	-573	-10.50%	5,455
Wright	4,443	47.52%	4,871	52.10%	17	0.18%	14	0.15%	5	0.05%	-428	-4.58%	9,350
Totals	632,370	52.03%	578,802	47.62%	2,284	0.19%	1,524	0.13%	452	0.04%	53,568	4.41%	1,215,432

==== Counties that flipped from Democratic to Republican ====
- Allamakee
- Bremer
- Buchanan
- Butler
- Cedar
- Cherokee
- Chickasaw
- Clarke
- Clayton
- Clinton
- Crawford
- Des Moines
- Dubuque
- Fayette
- Franklin
- Greene
- Grundy
- Hancock
- Hardin
- Harrison
- Howard
- Ida
- Iowa
- Jackson
- Jones
- Keokuk
- Lee
- Linn
- Lousia
- Lucas
- Lyon
- Mahaska
- Mills
- Mitchell
- Muscatine
- O'Brien
- Osceola
- Plymouth
- Pottawattamie
- Sac
- Sioux
- Shelby
- Story
- Wayne
- Winnebago
- Winneshiek

== See also ==
- United States presidential elections in Iowa
