= Cloverdale, Iowa =

Unincorporated community in Iowa, US

- Unincorporated Community
- Location within Iowa Location within the United States
- Coordinates: 43°20′49″N 95°41′09″W
- Country: USA
- State: Iowa
- County: Osceola County
- Elevation: 466 m (1,529 ft)
- Time zone: UTC-6 (Central (CST))
  - Summer (DST): UTC-5 (CDT)
- Zip code: 51249
- Area code: 712
- GNIS feature ID: 455489

Cloverdale is an unincorporated community in Osceola County, Iowa, United States. It is located 5 miles southeast of the county seat Sibley, and 10 miles from the Iowa-Minnesota border.

== History ==
Cloverdale's population was 50 in 1925. The population was also 50 in 1940.
