= Ocheyedan, Iowa =

- City
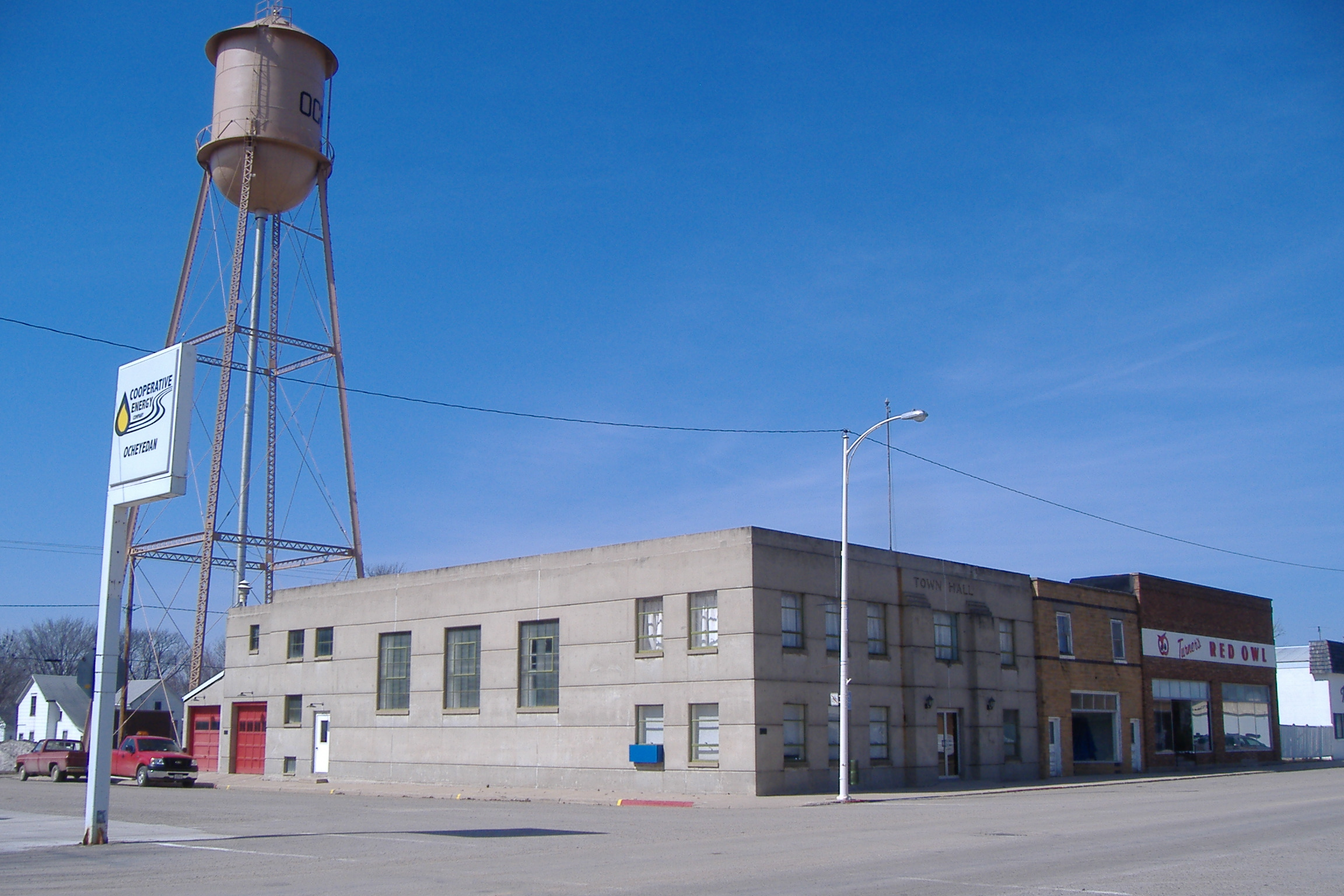
- City water tower and stores

- Location of Ocheyedan, Iowa
- Coordinates: 43°25′06″N 95°32′12″W
- Country: United States
- State: Iowa
- County: Osceola

Area
  - Total: 1.13 sq mi (2.93 km^{2})
  - Land: 1.13 sq mi (2.93 km^{2})
  - Water: 0 sq mi (0.00 km^{2})
- Elevation: 1,555 ft (474 m)

Population (2020)
  - Total: 439
  - Density: 387.9/sq mi (149.76/km^{2})
- Time zone: UTC-6 (Central (CST))
  - Summer (DST): UTC-5 (CDT)
- ZIP codes: 51349, 51354
- Area code: 712
- FIPS code: 19-58530
- GNIS feature ID: 2395296
- Website: ocheyedaniowa.gov

Ocheyedan is a city in Osceola County, Iowa, United States. The population was 439 at the time of the 2020 census.

== History ==
Ocheyedan had its start in the year 1884 by the building of the Burlington, Cedar Rapids and Northern Railroad through that territory.

Ocheyedan was declared the "most difficult to pronounce" place name in the state of Iowa by Reader's Digest. There is no standard pronunciation of the name, but the most widely known and generally accepted pronunciation is "oh-CHEED-en."

== Geography ==
According to the United States Census Bureau, the city has a total area of 1.16 square miles (3.00 km^{2}), all land.

There is a common misconception that the highest point in Iowa is the Ocheyedan Mound, located near Ocheyedan. The Ocheyedan Mound rises to 1,655 feet above sea level, just fifteen feet short of the actual highest point in Iowa, Hawkeye Point, which has an elevation of 1,670 feet.

The Ocheyedan River flows southwest of the city.

== Demographics ==
Historical population
Census	Pop.	Note	%±
1900	599		—
1910	595		−0.7%
1920	686		15.3%
1930	627		−8.6%
1940	712		13.6%
1950	700		−1.7%
1960	662		−5.4%
1970	545		−17.7%
1980	599		9.9%
1990	539		−10.0%
2000	536		−0.6%
2010	490		−8.6%
2020	439		−10.4%
U.S. Decennial Census

=== 2020 census ===
As of the census of 2020, there were 439 people, 211 households, and 127 families residing in the city. The population density was 387.9 inhabitants per square mile (149.8/km^{2}). There were 243 housing units at an average density of 214.7 per square mile (82.9/km^{2}). The racial makeup of the city was 94.1% White, 0.2% Black or African American, 0.2% Native American, 0.7% Asian, 0.0% Pacific Islander, 1.8% from other races and 3.0% from two or more races. Hispanic or Latino persons of any race comprised 3.2% of the population.

Of the 211 households, 23.2% of which had children under the age of 18 living with them, 49.3% were married couples living together, 7.6% were cohabitating couples, 21.3% had a female householder with no spouse or partner present and 21.8% had a male householder with no spouse or partner present. 39.8% of all households were non-families. 31.8% of all households were made up of individuals, 18.0% had someone living alone who was 65 years old or older.

The median age in the city was 46.5 years. 21.0% of the residents were under the age of 20; 6.4% were between the ages of 20 and 24; 20.0% were from 25 and 44; 28.5% were from 45 and 64; and 24.1% were 65 years of age or older. The gender makeup of the city was 50.1% male and 49.9% female.

=== 2010 census ===
As of the census of 2010, there were 490 people, 223 households, and 137 families residing in the city. The population density was 422.4 inhabitants per square mile (163.1/km^{2}). There were 252 housing units at an average density of 217.2 per square mile (83.9/km^{2}). The racial makeup of the city was 95.7% White, 0.2% African American, 0.4% Native American, 0.2% Asian, 2.0% from other races, and 1.4% from two or more races. Hispanic or Latino of any race were 3.7% of the population.

There were 223 households, of which 24.7% had children under the age of 18 living with them, 53.8% were married couples living together, 4.5% had a female householder with no husband present, 3.1% had a male householder with no wife present, and 38.6% were non-families. 35.9% of all households were made up of individuals, and 17.9% had someone living alone who was 65 years of age or older. The average household size was 2.20 and the average family size was 2.84.

The median age in the city was 46.3 years. 20.8% of residents were under the age of 18; 5.9% were between the ages of 18 and 24; 22.2% were from 25 to 44; 28.1% were from 45 to 64; and 22.9% were 65 years of age or older. The gender makeup of the city was 49.6% male and 50.4% female.

=== 2000 census ===
As of the census of 2000, there were 536 people, 223 households, and 146 families residing in the city. The population density was 461.1 inhabitants per square mile (178.0/km^{2}). There were 254 housing units at an average density of 218.5 per square mile (84.4/km^{2}). The racial makeup of the city was 99.63% White, 0.19% from other races, and 0.19% from two or more races. Hispanic or Latino of any race were 0.56% of the population.

There were 223 households, out of which 29.6% had children under the age of 18 living with them, 59.6% were married couples living together, 4.9% had a female householder with no husband present, and 34.1% were non-families. 31.8% of all households were made up of individuals, and 17.5% had someone living alone who was 65 years of age or older. The average household size was 2.40 and the average family size was 3.04.

Population spread: 25.4% under the age of 18, 8.0% from 18 to 24, 25.9% from 25 to 44, 20.5% from 45 to 64, and 20.1% who were 65 years of age or older. The median age was 40 years. For every 100 females, there were 100.7 males. For every 100 females age 18 and over, there were 92.3 males.

The median income for a household in the city was $31,513, and the median income for a family was $36,607. Males had a median income of $29,464 versus $16,944 for females. The per capita income for the city was $14,554. About 5.3% of families and 4.8% of the population were below the poverty line, including 1.5% of those under age 18 and 10.8% of those age 65 or over.

== Education ==
Sibley-Ocheyedan Community School District serves the community. The district formed on July 1, 1985, as a merger of the Sibley and Ocheyedan school districts.

The district previously operated Ocheyedan Elementary School. The district closed it in 2009. A reduction in the number of students was the reason for the closure. By 2014 the district was trying to find another use for the building.

== Notable people ==
- Don Frerichs, businessman and Minnesota State Representative
- Emma Clara Schweer, Illinois politician
