= Viola Township, Osceola County, Iowa =

Township in Osceola County, Iowa, U.S.

Coordinates: 43°28′N 95°48′W

Viola Township is a township in Osceola County, Iowa, United States. Viola Township is located on the Minnesota-Iowa border.

== History ==
Viola Township was originally called Fenton Township, and under the latter name established in 1872.
