= Osceola County Courthouse (Iowa) =

- U.S. National Register of Historic Places
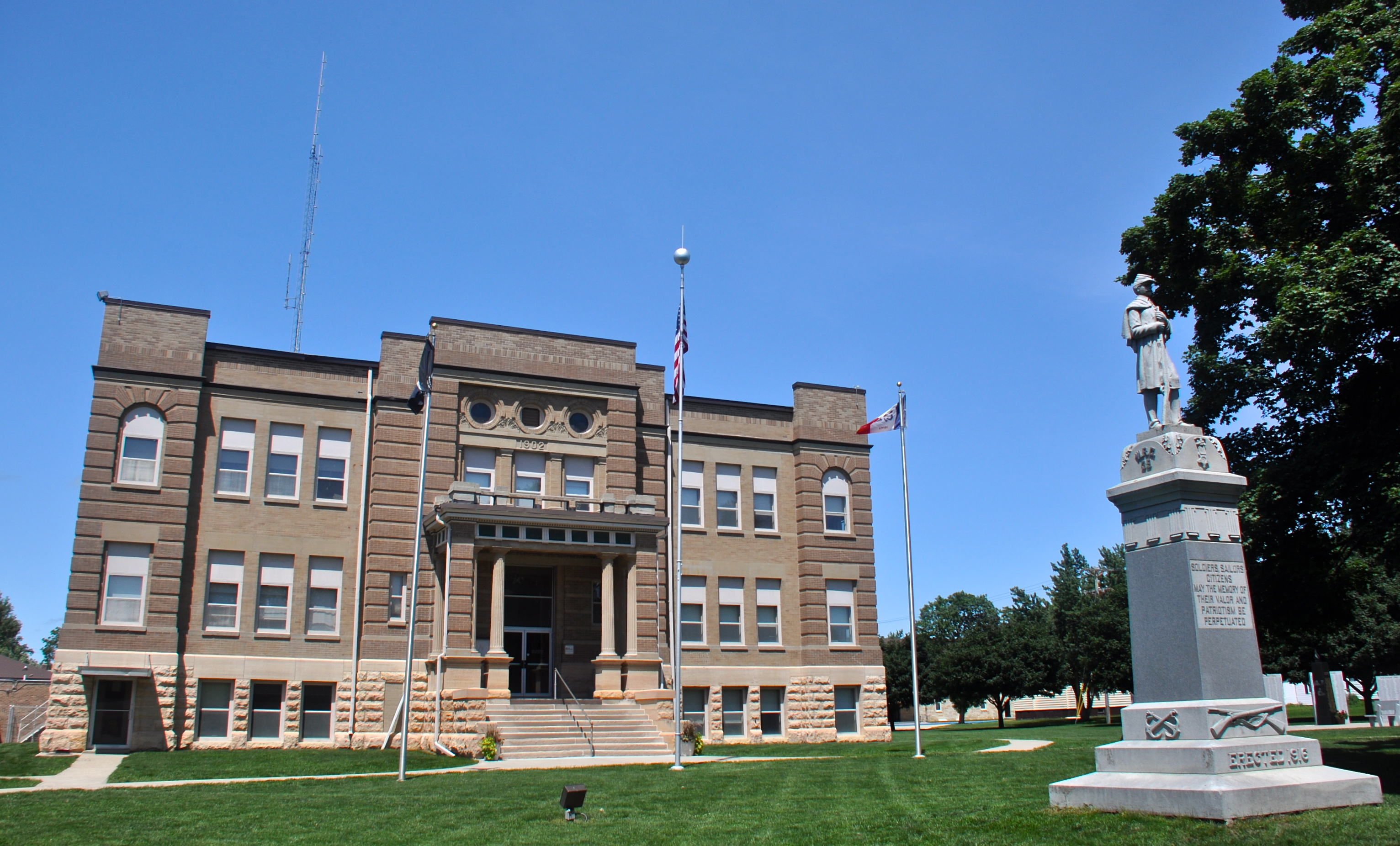
- Osceola County Courthouse, July 2014.

- Location within Iowa Location within the United States
- Location: 3rd Ave & 8th St. Sibley, Iowa
- Coordinates: 43°24′07.5″N 95°44′57.7″W
- Area: less than one acre
- Built: 1903
- Built by: C.E. Atkinson
- Architect: E.N. Kinney
- MPS: County Courthouses in Iowa TR
- NRHP reference No.: 81000261
- Added to NRHP: July 2, 1981

The Osceola County Courthouse in Sibley, Iowa, United States, was built in 1902. It was listed on the National Register of Historic Places in 1981 as a part of the County Courthouses in Iowa Thematic Resource. The courthouse is the second building the county has used for court functions and county administration.

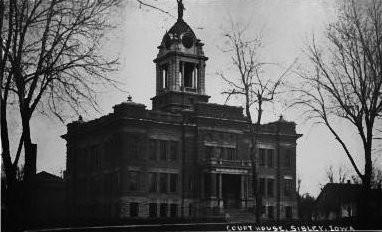
Courthouse circa 1914.

== History ==
Sibley was chosen as the Osceola County county seat because it was the first town established in the county. All of the wagon trails in the county led there after the railroad was completed there in 1872. The first courthouse was a two-story frame building built the same year for $5,000. There were shutters on all of the windows. The present courthouse was designed by E.N. Kinney and built by C.E. Atkinson from 1902 to 1903. The building follows no definable architectural style. It featured a cupola with a clock and a statue of Justice on top. The building had major renovation projects in the 1920s and in 1961. The cupola, clock and statue were removed during the later renovation.

== Architecture ==
The courthouse is a two-story stone structure built on a raised basement and capped with a flat roof. The basement level of the building is coarse stone. The south elevation has a projecting pavilion with a single-story portico that features two columns and a recessed entrance. Three circular windows are located above the second story windows. Each of the corners of the building also project from the main building and have arched windows on the second story. The interior may be the more significant part of the building. The rotunda is separated from the hallways by column screens. The rotunda also features wide friezes with medallions, oval opening in the floor, wooden balusters, and brass railings. The first floor has tile floors. The significance of the courthouse is derived from its association with county government, and the political power and prestige of Sibley as the county seat.
