= Goewey Township, Osceola County, Iowa =

Township in Iowa, USA

Coordinates: 43°18′N 95°41′W

Goewey Township is a township in Osceola County, Iowa, United States.
