= Fairview Township, Osceola County, Iowa =

Township in Osceola County, Iowa, U.S.

Coordinates: 43.465°N 95.446°W

Fairview Township is a township in Osceola County, Iowa, United States. The city of Harris is located in Fairview Township.

== History ==
Fairview Township was founded in 1874. It was named from the beauty of their land.
