= Hartley–Melvin–Sanborn Community School District =

Public school district in Hartley, Iowa, United States

Coordinates: 43.185717°N 95.485024°W

Location
- Hartley, Iowa O'Brien, Osceola, and Dickinson counties United States
- Coordinates: 43.185717, -95.485024

District information
- Type: Local school district
- Grades: K–12
- Established: 1991
- Superintendent: Patrick Carlin
- Schools: 3
- Budget: $11,871,000 (2020-21)
- NCES District ID: 1931660

Students and staff
- Students: 663 (2022-23)
- Teachers: 56.36 FTE
- Staff: 51.57 FTE
- Student–teacher ratio: 11.76
- Athletic conference: War Eagle
- District mascot: Hawks
- Colors: Maroon and Gold

Other information
- Website: www.hartley-ms.k12.ia.us

The Hartley–Melvin–Sanborn (H-M-S) Community School District is a rural public school district headquartered in Hartley, Iowa. The district is located in portions of O'Brien and Osceola counties, with a small section in Dickinson County. It serves the cities of Hartley, Melvin, Sanborn and May City.

== History ==
The district formed on July 1, 1991, with the merger of the Hartley–Melvin and Sanborn districts.

In April 2014, there was a first attempt at a school bond that was voted down with only 40% of voters approving, and in September 2016 a second attempt, with $16.2 million for the bond, failed with 56% support. The margin of failure that time was 47 votes.

The district attempted to pass a $16.5 million bond in April 2017 and stated it would close Hartley–Melvin–Sanborn Elementary School in Hartley if it did not pass. The bond needed a 60% threshold to pass, but the count was 904–615, with only 59.5% approving. On December 11, 2017, the district said the school would close after Spring 2019. Initial plans were to move elementary students to the middle school building.

In 2018 another bond, for $18.9 million, was voted on and passed. The new bond will add a new elementary school to the high school and renovated and expanded the existing middle school. This project is estimated to be completed in the fall of 2020.

The HMS Quizbowl team won the 2020 KCAU9 tournament hosted by Buena Vista University. Thus earning themselves a spot at the state and national competitions that were ultimately canceled by COVID-19.

== Schools ==
- Hartley–Melvin–Sanborn High School (Hartley)
- Hartley–Melvin–Sanborn Middle School (Sanborn)
- Hartley–Melvin–Sanborn Elementary School (Hartley)
  - It previously had a standalone building constructed in the 1930s. In 2018 HMS administrators stated that the building did not comply with the Americans with Disabilities Act (ADA), and also argued that it was generally out of date. The former building was scheduled to close in 2019.
  - The new elementary school was completed in August 2020 by Boyd Jones construction.

== See also ==
- List of school districts in Iowa
