= Harris, Iowa =

- City
- Location of Harris, Iowa
- Coordinates: 43°26′42″N 95°26′14″W
- Country: USA
- State: Iowa
- County: Osceola

Area
  - Total: 1.00 sq mi (2.59 km^{2})
  - Land: 1.00 sq mi (2.59 km^{2})
  - Water: 0 sq mi (0.00 km^{2})
- Elevation: 1,542 ft (470 m)

Population (2020)
  - Total: 151
  - Density: 150.7/sq mi (58.19/km^{2})
- Time zone: UTC-6 (Central (CST))
  - Summer (DST): UTC-5 (CDT)
- ZIP code: 51345
- Area code: 712
- FIPS code: 19-34635
- GNIS feature ID: 2394303

Harris is a city in Osceola County, Iowa, United States. The population was 151 at the time of the 2020 census.

== History ==
Harris had its start in the year 1889 by the building of the Burlington, Cedar Rapids & Northern Railway through Fairview Township. It was named for one of its founders, A. W. Harris. Homer E. Richards was postmaster of Harris from 1900 until 1910; after being elected county treasurer he relocated his family to Sibley on 1 January 1911.

Harris has acted as a city since 1903, the year the Rock Island Line took over the railroad. But incorporation papers could not be found in county nor state archives, so by legislative act effective 1 July 1979 the incorporation of the City of Harris was legalized.

== Geography ==
According to the United States Census Bureau, the city has a total area of 0.79 square miles (2.05 km^{2}), all land.

== Demographics ==
Historical population
Census	Pop.	Note	%±
1900	217		—
1910	239		10.1%
1920	359		50.2%
1930	328		−8.6%
1940	309		−5.8%
1950	319		3.2%
1960	258		−19.1%
1970	195		−24.4%
1980	228		16.9%
1990	170		−25.4%
2000	200		17.6%
2010	170		−15.0%
2020	151		−11.2%
U.S. Decennial Census

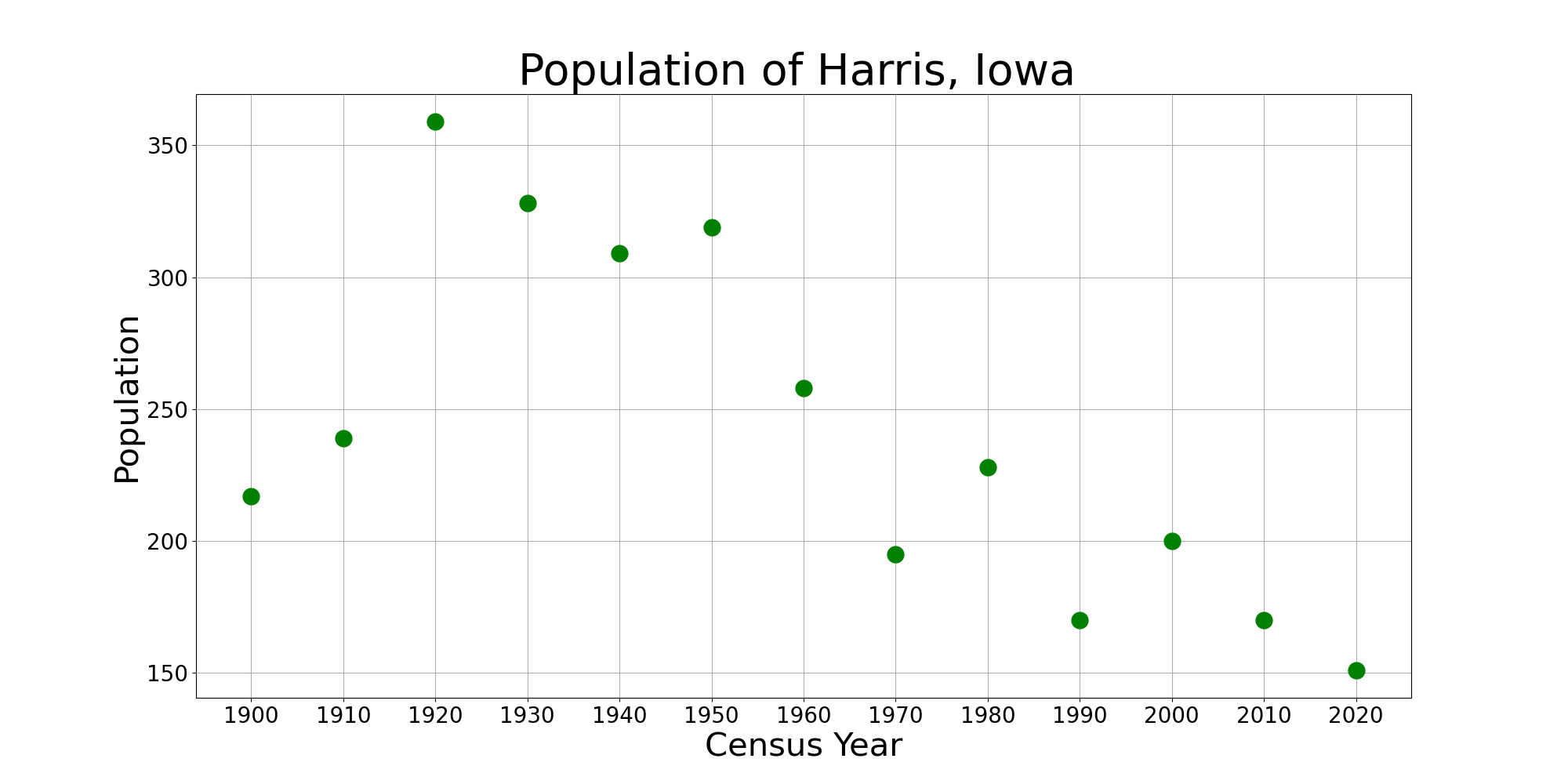
The population of Harris, Iowa from US census data

=== 2020 census ===
As of the census of 2020, there were 151 people, 76 households, and 44 families residing in the city. The population density was 150.7 inhabitants per square mile (58.2/km^{2}). There were 86 housing units at an average density of 85.8 per square mile (33.1/km^{2}). The racial makeup of the city was 89.4% White, 0.0% Black or African American, 1.3% Native American, 0.0% Asian, 0.0% Pacific Islander, 1.3% from other races and 7.9% from two or more races. Hispanic or Latino persons of any race comprised 3.3% of the population.

Of the 76 households, 34.2% of which had children under the age of 18 living with them, 43.4% were married couples living together, 7.9% were cohabitating couples, 19.7% had a female householder with no spouse or partner present and 28.9% had a male householder with no spouse or partner present. 42.1% of all households were non-families. 34.2% of all households were made up of individuals, 9.2% had someone living alone who was 65 years old or older.

The median age in the city was 53.2 years. 22.5% of the residents were under the age of 20; 1.3% were between the ages of 20 and 24; 16.6% were from 25 and 44; 32.5% were from 45 and 64; and 27.2% were 65 years of age or older. The gender makeup of the city was 55.0% male and 45.0% female.

=== 2010 census ===
As of the census of 2010, there were 170 people, 75 households, and 45 families living in the city. The population density was 215.2 inhabitants per square mile (83.1/km^{2}). There were 90 housing units at an average density of 113.9 per square mile (44.0/km^{2}). The racial makeup of the city was 97.6% White, 1.2% Native American, and 1.2% from two or more races. Hispanic or Latino of any race were 1.2% of the population.

There were 75 households, of which 25.3% had children under the age of 18 living with them, 46.7% were married couples living together, 9.3% had a female householder with no husband present, 4.0% had a male householder with no wife present, and 40.0% were non-families. 33.3% of all households were made up of individuals, and 10.6% had someone living alone who was 65 years of age or older. The average household size was 2.27 and the average family size was 2.82.

The median age in the city was 44 years. 20.6% of residents were under the age of 18; 10% were between the ages of 18 and 24; 20.6% were from 25 to 44; 34.7% were from 45 to 64; and 14.1% were 65 years of age or older. The gender makeup of the city was 52.4% male and 47.6% female.

=== 2000 census ===
As of the census of 2000, there were 200 people, 86 households, and 47 families living in the city. The population density was 252.6 inhabitants per square mile (97.5/km^{2}). There were 91 housing units at an average density of 114.9 per square mile (44.4/km^{2}). The racial makeup of the city was 95.00% White, 0.50% Native American, 1.50% from other races, and 3.00% from two or more races. Hispanic or Latino of any race were 4.00% of the population.

There were 86 households, out of which 25.6% had children under the age of 18 living with them, 45.3% were married couples living together, 7.0% had a female householder with no husband present, and 44.2% were non-families. 37.2% of all households were made up of individuals, and 9.3% had someone living alone who was 65 years of age or older. The average household size was 2.33 and the average family size was 3.19.

Age spread: 25.5% under the age of 18, 10.5% from 18 to 24, 33.0% from 25 to 44, 21.0% from 45 to 64, and 10.0% who were 65 years of age or older. The median age was 35 years. For every 100 females, there were 94.2 males. For every 100 females age 18 and over, there were 106.9 males.

The median income for a household in the city was $35,625, and the median income for a family was $46,250. Males had a median income of $27,500 versus $23,571 for females. The per capita income for the city was $15,788. About 13.7% of families and 14.1% of the population were below the poverty line, including 29.1% of those under the age of eighteen and 26.1% of those 65 or over.
