= Carroll Township, O'Brien County, Iowa =

Township in O'Brien County, Iowa

Coordinates: 43.1278°N 95.8017°W

Carroll Township is a township in O'Brien County, Iowa, United States.

== History ==
Carroll Township was founded in 1872. It was named for Patrick Carroll, a pioneer settler.
