= Horton Township, Osceola County, Iowa =

Township in Iowa, USA

Coordinates: 43°29′N 95°34′W

Horton Township is a township in Osceola County, Iowa, United States.
