= Osceola County, Iowa =

County in Iowa, United States

- County
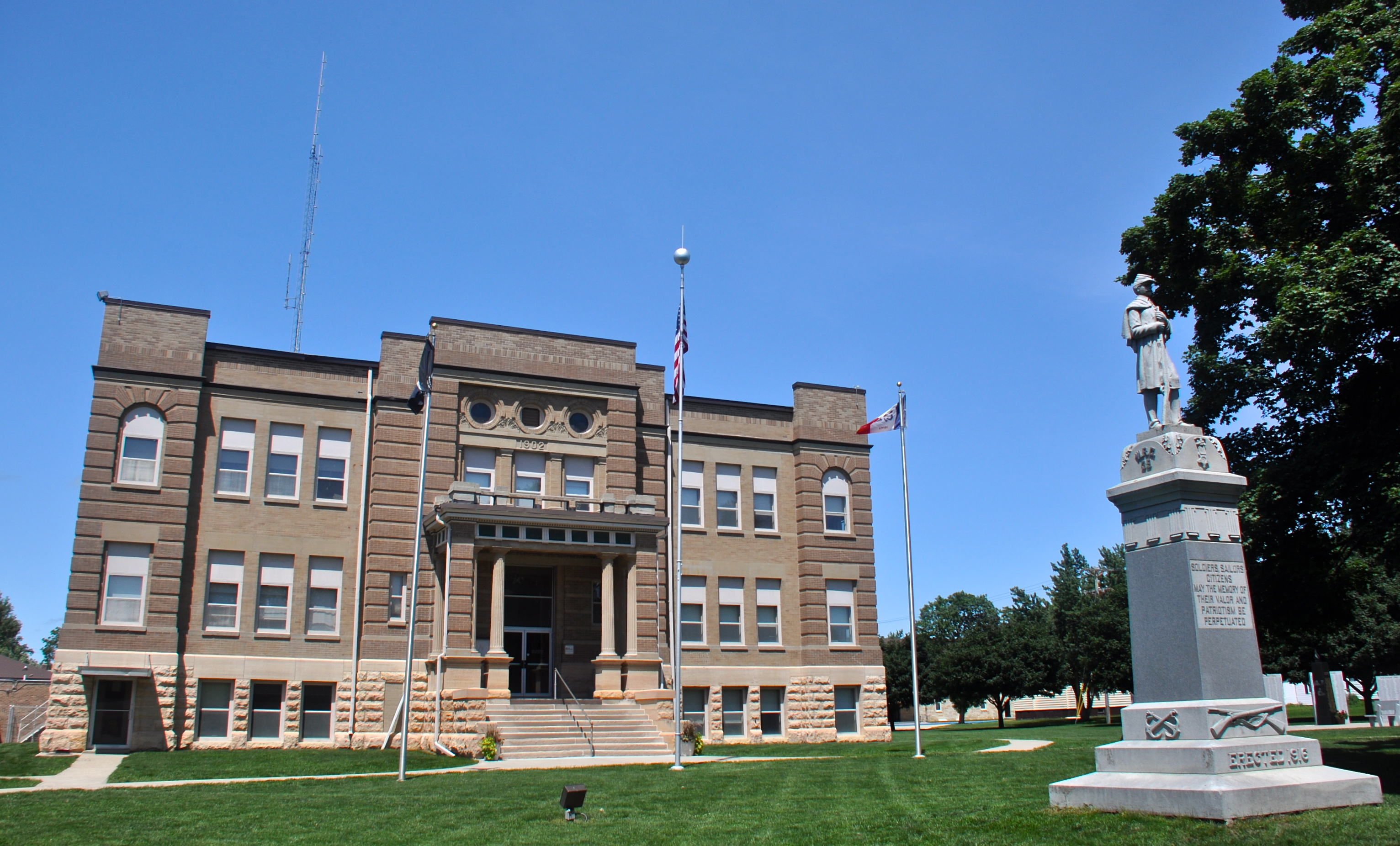
- The Osceola County Courthouse in Sibley in July 2014

- Location within the U.S. state of Iowa
- Coordinates: 43.378542°N 95.633788°W
- Country: United States
- State: Iowa
- Founded: January 15, 1851 (created); January 1, 1872 (organized)
- Named for: Osceola
- Seat: Sibley
- Largest city: Sibley

Area
  - Total: 399.396 sq mi (1,034.43 km^{2})
  - Land: 398.687 sq mi (1,032.59 km^{2})
  - Water: 0.709 sq mi (1.84 km^{2}) 0.18%

Population (2020)
  - Total: 6,192
  - Estimate (2025): 5,980 ▼
  - Density: 15.53/sq mi (5.997/km^{2})
- Time zone: UTC−6 (Central)
  - Summer (DST): UTC−5 (CDT)
- Area code: 712
- Congressional district: 4th
- Website: osceolacountyia.gov
- Iowa county number 72

Osceola County (/ˌɒsiˈoʊlə/ OSS-ee-OH-lə) is a county located in the U.S. state of Iowa. As of the 2020 census the population was 6,192, and was estimated to be 5,980 in 2025, making it the fifth-least populous county in Iowa. It is named for Seminole war chief Osceola. The county seat and the largest city is Sibley, named for H. H. Sibley of Minnesota.

== History ==
Osceola County was created on January 15, 1851 and organized on January 1, 1872. It was named after the eponymous chief of the Seminole. It is the smallest and most recent county in Iowa. In the same year the first settler arrived, Captain Eldred Huff, and laid his claim. On January 1, 1872, the county government conferred for the first time. The first courthouse, constructed of wood, was built in November of the following year and simultaneously served as the conference chamber, school and church. In September 1903, the second courthouse was finished and was wired for electricity in October 1915.

== Geography ==
According to the United States Census Bureau, the county has a total area of 399.396 square miles (1,034.43 km^{2}), of which 398.687 square miles (1,032.59 km^{2}) is land and 0.709 square miles (1.84 km^{2}) (0.18%) is water. It is the third-smallest county in Iowa by total area. The highest natural point in Iowa, Hawkeye Point at 1,670 feet (510 m), is located in Osceola County.

=== Major highways ===
- U.S. Highway 59
- Iowa Highway 9
- Iowa Highway 60

=== Adjacent counties ===
- Nobles County, Minnesota (northwest)
- Jackson County, Minnesota (northeast)
- Dickinson County (east)
- O'Brien County (south)
- Lyon County (west)

== Demographics ==
Historical population
Census	Pop.	Note	%±
1880	2,219		—
1890	5,574		151.2%
1900	8,725		56.5%
1910	8,956		2.6%
1920	10,223		14.1%
1930	10,182		−0.4%
1940	10,607		4.2%
1950	10,181		−4.0%
1960	10,064		−1.1%
1970	8,555		−15.0%
1980	8,371		−2.2%
1990	7,267		−13.2%
2000	7,003		−3.6%
2010	6,462		−7.7%
2020	6,192		−4.2%
2025 (est.)	5,980	▼	−3.4%
U.S. Decennial Census; 1790–1960 1900–1990; 1990–2000 2010–2020

As of the second quarter of 2025, the median home value in Osceola County was $139,287.

As of the 2024 American Community Survey, there are 2,634 estimated households in Osceola County with an average of 2.27 persons per household. The county has a median household income of $69,239. Approximately 16.0% of the county's population lives at or below the poverty line. Osceola County has an estimated 63.0% employment rate, with 16.7% of the population holding a bachelor's degree or higher and 87.4% holding a high school diploma. There were 2,868 housing units at an average density of 7.19 per square mile (2.8/km^{2}).

The top five reported languages (people were allowed to report up to two languages, thus the figures will generally add to more than 100%) were English (89.8%), Spanish (9.2%), Indo-European (0.4%), Asian and Pacific Islander (0.6%), and Other (0.0%).

The median age in the county was 43.1 years.

Osceola County, Iowa – racial and ethnic composition Note: the US Census treats Hispanic/Latino as an ethnic category. This table excludes Latinos from the racial categories and assigns them to a separate category. Hispanics/Latinos may be of any race.
Race / ethnicity (NH = non-Hispanic)	Pop. 1980	Pop. 1990	Pop. 2000	Pop. 2010	Pop. 2020
White alone (NH)	8,314 (99.32%)	7,220 (99.35%)	6,812 (97.27%)	5,937 (91.88%)	5,341 (86.26%)
Black or African American alone (NH)	10 (0.12%)	3 (0.04%)	8 (0.11%)	15 (0.23%)	28 (0.45%)
Native American or Alaska Native alone (NH)	12 (0.14%)	9 (0.12%)	18 (0.26%)	19 (0.29%)	18 (0.29%)
Asian alone (NH)	6 (0.07%)	16 (0.22%)	14 (0.20%)	19 (0.29%)	21 (0.34%)
Pacific Islander alone (NH)	—	—	0 (0.00%)	1 (0.02%)	36 (0.58%)
Other race alone (NH)	7 (0.08%)	3 (0.04%)	0 (0.00%)	3 (0.05%)	11 (0.18%)
Mixed race or multiracial (NH)	—	—	26 (0.37%)	38 (0.59%)	134 (2.16%)
Hispanic or Latino (any race)	22 (0.26%)	16 (0.22%)	125 (1.78%)	430 (6.65%)	603 (9.74%)
Total	8,371 (100.00%)	7,267 (100.00%)	7,003 (100.00%)	6,462 (100.00%)	6,192 (100.00%)

=== 2024 estimate ===
As of the 2024 estimate, there were 6,036 people, 2,634 households, and _ families residing in the county. The population density was 15.14 inhabitants per square mile (5.8/km^{2}). There were 2,868 housing units at an average density of 7.19 per square mile (2.8/km^{2}). The racial makeup of the county was 94.4% White (83.7% NH White), 1.3% African American, 0.6% Native American, 1.0% Asian, 1.1% Pacific Islander, _% from some other races and 1.5% from two or more races. Hispanic or Latino people of any race were 11.5% of the population.

=== 2020 census ===
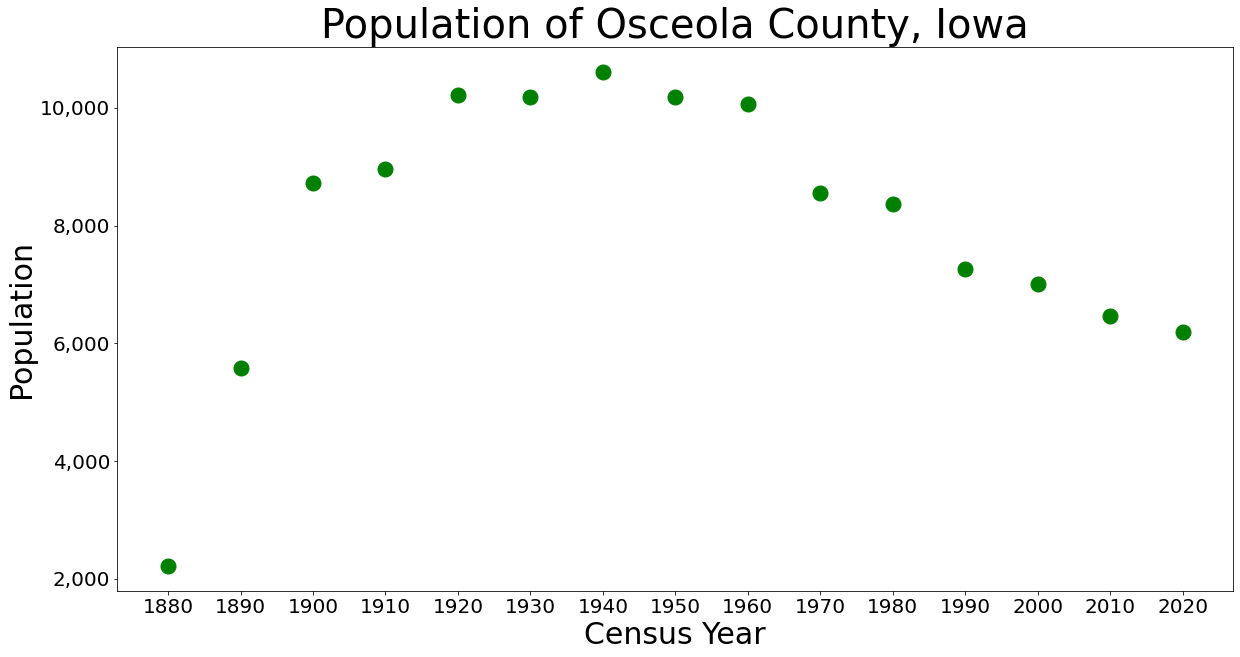
Population of Osceola County from the U.S. census data

As of the 2020 census, there were 6,192 people, 2,599 households, and 1,680 families residing in the county. The population density was 15.53 inhabitants per square mile (6.0/km^{2}). There were 2,878 housing units at an average density of 7.22 per square mile (2.8/km^{2}). The racial makeup of the county was 88.58% White, 0.48% African American, 0.52% Native American, 0.34% Asian, 0.58% Pacific Islander, 4.44% from some other races and 5.05% from two or more races. Hispanic or Latino people of any race were 9.74% of the population.

The median age was 43.1 years. 22.8% of residents were under the age of 18 and 21.2% of residents were 65 years of age or older. For every 100 females there were 102.6 males, and for every 100 females age 18 and over there were 100.7 males age 18 and over.

<0.1% of residents lived in urban areas, while 100.0% lived in rural areas.

There were 2,599 households in the county, of which 27.7% had children under the age of 18 living in them. Of all households, 52.7% were married-couple households, 18.7% were households with a male householder and no spouse or partner present, and 21.7% were households with a female householder and no spouse or partner present. About 30.0% of all households were made up of individuals and 14.8% had someone living alone who was 65 years of age or older.

Of the housing units, 9.7% were vacant. Among occupied housing units, 77.1% were owner-occupied and 22.9% were renter-occupied; the homeowner vacancy rate was 1.2% and the rental vacancy rate was 7.0%.

=== 2010 census ===
As of the 2010 census, there were 6,462 people, 2,682 households, and _ families residing in the county. The population density was 16.21 inhabitants per square mile (6.3/km^{2}). There were 2,990 housing units at an average density of 7.50 per square mile (2.9/km^{2}). The racial makeup of the county was 95.16% White, 0.28% African American, 0.32% Native American, 0.29% Asian, 0.08% Pacific Islander, 3.10% from some other races and 0.77% from two or more races. Hispanic or Latino people of any race were 6.65% of the population.

=== 2000 census ===
As of the 2000 census, there were 7,003 people, 2,778 households, and 1,941 families residing in the county. The population density was 17.57 inhabitants per square mile (6.8/km^{2}). There were 3,012 housing units at an average density of 7.55 per square mile (2.9/km^{2}). The racial makeup of the county was 98.04% White, 0.11% African American, 0.26% Native American, 0.20% Asian, 0.01% Pacific Islander, 0.84% from some other races and 0.53% from two or more races. Hispanic or Latino people of any race were 1.78% of the population.

There were 2,778 households, out of which 31.70% had children under the age of 18 living with them, 62.00% were married couples living together, 5.10% had a female householder with no husband present, and 30.10% were non-families. 27.60% of all households were made up of individuals, and 15.10% had someone living alone who was 65 years of age or older. The average household size was 2.48 and the average family size was 3.03.

In the county, the population was spread out, with 26.10% under the age of 18, 7.20% from 18 to 24, 26.20% from 25 to 44, 21.60% from 45 to 64, and 18.90% who were 65 years of age or older. The median age was 40 years. For every 100 females there were 95.00 males. For every 100 females age 18 and over, there were 94.30 males.

The median income for a household in the county was $34,274, and the median income for a family was $41,977. Males had a median income of $29,624 versus $20,522 for females. The per capita income for the county was $16,463. About 6.00% of families and 7.00% of the population were below the poverty line, including 7.90% of those under age 18 and 9.80% of those age 65 or over.

== Communities ==
=== Cities ===
- Ashton
- Harris
- Melvin
- Ocheyedan
- Sibley

=== Townships ===
- Allison
- Baker
- East Holman
- Fairview
- Gilman
- Goewey
- Harrison
- Horton
- Ocheyedan
- Viola
- West Holman
- Wilson

=== Unincorporated communities ===
- Allendorf
- Cloverdale
- May City

=== Population ranking ===
The population ranking of the following table is based on the 2020 census of Osceola County.

† county seat

Rank	City/Town/etc.	Municipal type	Population (2020 Census)	Population (2024 Estimate)
1	† Sibley	City	2,860	2,787
2	Ocheyedan	City	439	424
3	Ashton	City	436	434
4	Melvin	City	199	196
5	Harris	City	151	145

== Politics ==
In presidential elections, Osceola County voters have cast their lot chiefly with Republican candidates for office, with the last Democrat to win the county being Lyndon Johnson in 1964.

United States presidential election results for Osceola County, Iowa
Year	Republican		Democratic		Third party(ies)	
Year	No.	%	No.	%	No.	%
1896	1,094	57.91%	767	40.60%	28	1.48%
1900	1,106	56.89%	799	41.10%	39	2.01%
1904	1,179	67.37%	554	31.66%	17	0.97%
1908	1,000	55.34%	777	43.00%	30	1.66%
1912	520	26.56%	786	40.14%	652	33.30%
1916	1,258	58.05%	874	40.33%	35	1.62%
1920	2,717	76.73%	754	21.29%	70	1.98%
1924	1,876	50.42%	386	10.37%	1,459	39.21%
1928	2,085	56.69%	1,567	42.60%	26	0.71%
1932	1,190	31.08%	2,590	67.64%	49	1.28%
1936	1,539	34.56%	2,812	63.15%	102	2.29%
1940	2,425	51.14%	2,288	48.25%	29	0.61%
1944	2,100	55.29%	1,689	44.47%	9	0.24%
1948	1,772	44.99%	2,123	53.90%	44	1.12%
1952	3,573	71.73%	1,396	28.03%	12	0.24%
1956	2,986	62.57%	1,779	37.28%	7	0.15%
1960	2,965	62.00%	1,814	37.93%	3	0.06%
1964	1,798	41.80%	2,498	58.08%	5	0.12%
1968	2,516	61.34%	1,420	34.62%	166	4.05%
1972	2,262	62.56%	1,317	36.42%	37	1.02%
1976	1,955	58.52%	1,309	39.18%	77	2.30%
1980	2,177	62.45%	1,051	30.15%	258	7.40%
1984	2,285	65.98%	1,146	33.09%	32	0.92%
1988	1,951	59.77%	1,277	39.12%	36	1.10%
1992	1,756	48.78%	990	27.50%	854	23.72%
1996	1,736	56.90%	1,010	33.10%	305	10.00%
2000	2,064	67.38%	913	29.81%	86	2.81%
2004	2,295	70.27%	934	28.60%	37	1.13%
2008	2,027	64.78%	1,037	33.14%	65	2.08%
2012	2,230	69.82%	912	28.55%	52	1.63%
2016	2,531	78.77%	552	17.18%	130	4.05%
2020	2,690	80.83%	601	18.06%	37	1.11%
2024	2,623	81.23%	555	17.19%	51	1.58%

== Education ==
School districts include:

- Sibley–Ocheyedan Community School District, Sibley
- George–Little Rock Community School District, George
- Hartley–Melvin–Sanborn Community School District, Hartley
- Harris–Lake Park Community School District, Lake Park
- Sheldon Community School District, Sheldon

== See also ==
- Osceola County Courthouse
- National Register of Historic Places listings in Osceola County, Iowa
