= 1912 United States presidential election in Iowa =

- November 5, 1912

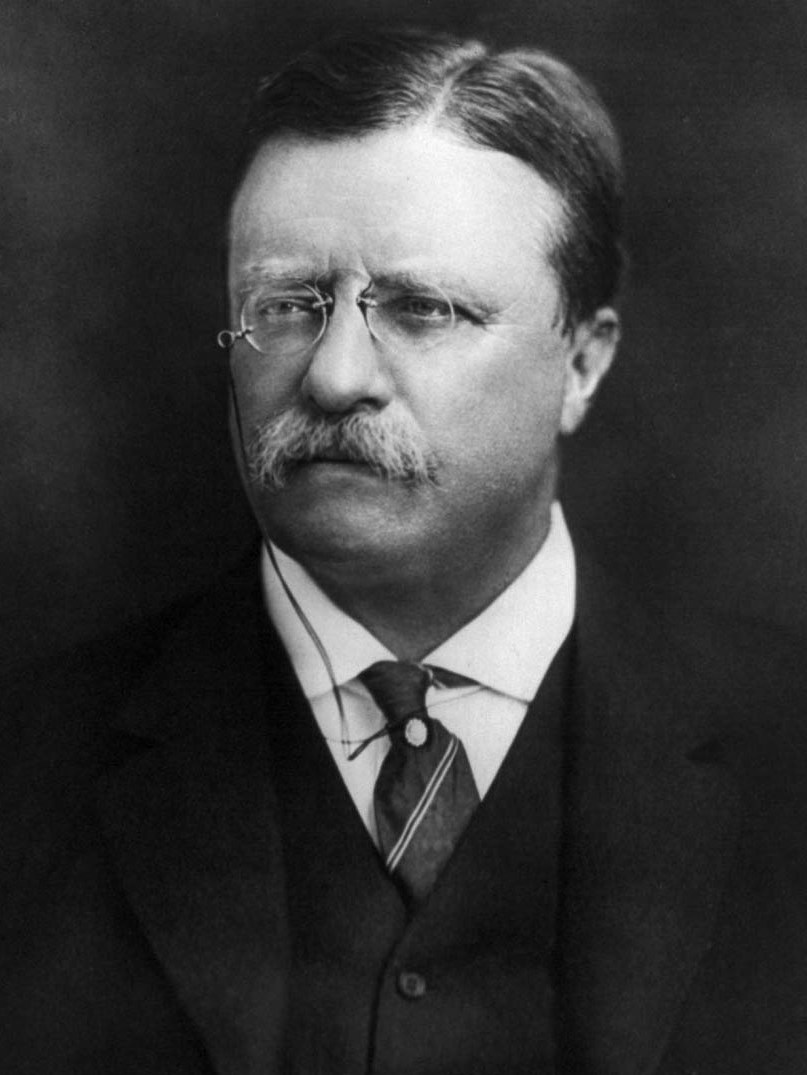

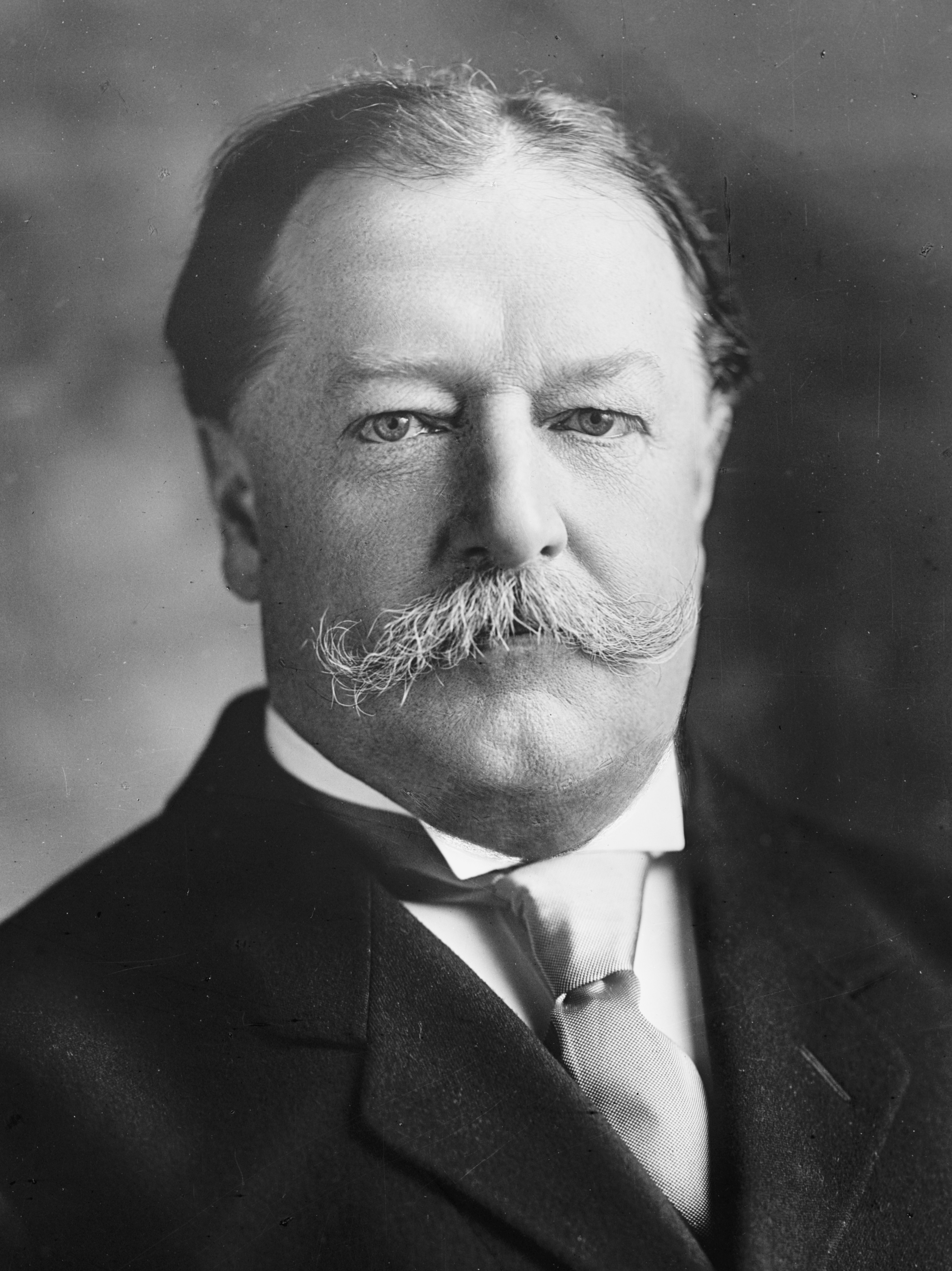
Nominee	Woodrow Wilson	Theodore Roosevelt	William Howard Taft
Party	Democratic	Progressive	Republican
Home state	New Jersey	New York	Ohio
Running mate	Thomas R. Marshall	Hiram Johnson	Nicholas M. Butler
Electoral vote	13	0	0
Popular vote	185,325	161,819	119,805
Percentage	37.64%	32.87%	24.33%
County results
Wilson
30–40%
40–50%
50–60%
Roosevelt
20–30%
30–40%
40–50%
50–60%
Taft
30–40%
40–50%
President before election
William Howard Taft
Republican
Elected President
Woodrow Wilson
Democratic

The 1912 United States presidential election in Iowa took place on November 5, 1912, as part of the 1912 United States presidential election. Voters chose 13 representatives, or electors, to the Electoral College, who voted for president and vice president.

Iowa was won by Princeton University President Woodrow Wilson (D–New Jersey), running with governor of Indiana Thomas R. Marshall, with 37.64% of the popular vote, against the 26th president of the United States Theodore Roosevelt (P–New York), running with governor of California Hiram Johnson, with 32.87% of the popular vote and the 27th president of the United States William Howard Taft (R–Ohio), running with Columbia University President Nicholas Murray Butler, with 24.33% of the popular vote.

Wilson was the first Democrat to win Iowa's electoral votes since Franklin Pierce in 1852. No Democrat would obtain a majority until Franklin Roosevelt in 1932.

== Results ==
1912 United States presidential election in Iowa
Party	Candidate	Votes	%
Democratic	Woodrow Wilson	185,325	37.64%
Progressive	Theodore Roosevelt	161,819	32.87%
Republican	William Howard Taft (incumbent)	119,805	24.33%
Socialist	Eugene V. Debs	16,967	3.45%
Prohibition	Eugene Chafin	8,440	1.71%
Total votes		492,356	100%

=== Results by county ===
County	Thomas Woodrow Wilson Democratic		William Howard Taft Republican		Theodore Roosevelt Progressive "Bull Moose"		Eugene Victor Debs Socialist		Eugene Wilder Chafin Prohibition		Margin (Note: Because Wilson finished first and Roosevelt second in Iowa as a whole, all margins given are Wilson vote minus Roosevelt vote and percentage margins Wilson percentage minus Roosevelt percentage unless otherwise stated for the county in question.)		Total votes cast
County	#	%	#	%	#	%	#	%	#	%	#	%	Total votes cast
Adair	1,195	35.13%	1,248	36.68%	890	26.16%	31	0.91%	38	1.12%	-53 (Note: In this county where Roosevelt did run third behind Wilson and Taft, margin given is Wilson vote minus Taft vote and percentage margin Wilson percentage minus Taft percentage.)	-1.56%	3,402
Adams	1,215	43.66%	913	32.81%	571	20.52%	32	1.15%	52	1.87%	302	10.85%	2,783
Allamakee	1,767	40.52%	1,269	29.10%	1,273	29.19%	39	0.89%	13	0.30%	494	11.33%	4,361
Appanoose	2,058	35.44%	2,356	40.57%	969	16.69%	359	6.18%	65	1.12%	-298	-5.13%	5,807
Audubon	963	36.39%	692	26.15%	968	36.58%	10	0.38%	13	0.49%	-5	-0.19%	2,646
Benton	2,472	42.56%	1,831	31.53%	1,234	21.25%	199	3.43%	72	1.24%	641	11.04%	5,808
Black Hawk	3,702	34.76%	1,601	15.03%	4,724	44.36%	411	3.86%	211	1.98%	-1,022	-9.60%	10,649
Boone	1,601	27.23%	802	13.64%	2,835	48.21%	537	9.13%	105	1.79%	-1,234	-20.99%	5,880
Bremer	1,944	51.65%	1,013	26.91%	741	19.69%	24	0.64%	42	1.12%	931	24.73%	3,764
Buchanan	1,866	39.54%	1,271	26.93%	1,455	30.83%	23	0.49%	104	2.20%	411	8.71%	4,719
Buena Vista	921	25.34%	755	20.77%	1,852	50.95%	61	1.68%	46	1.27%	-931	-25.61%	3,635
Butler	926	26.48%	903	25.82%	1,553	44.41%	28	0.80%	87	2.49%	-627	-17.93%	3,497
Calhoun	1,182	32.66%	963	26.61%	1,324	36.58%	85	2.35%	65	1.80%	-142	-3.92%	3,619
Carroll	2,326	54.32%	664	15.51%	1,188	27.74%	53	1.24%	51	1.19%	1,138	26.58%	4,282
Cass	1,510	33.59%	1,724	38.35%	1,096	24.38%	103	2.29%	62	1.38%	-214	-4.76%	4,495
Cedar	1,938	43.85%	1,036	23.44%	1,364	30.86%	43	0.97%	39	0.88%	574	12.99%	4,420
Cerro Gordo	1,742	33.49%	1,334	25.64%	1,814	34.87%	212	4.08%	100	1.92%	-72	-1.38%	5,202
Cherokee	930	30.08%	381	12.32%	1,680	54.33%	56	1.81%	45	1.46%	-750	-24.26%	3,092
Chickasaw	1,891	52.08%	1,022	28.15%	662	18.23%	35	0.96%	21	0.58%	869	23.93%	3,631
Clarke	910	36.56%	882	35.44%	595	23.91%	21	0.84%	81	3.25%	28	1.12%	2,489
Clay	707	25.04%	679	24.04%	1,347	47.70%	50	1.77%	41	1.45%	-640	-22.66%	2,824
Clayton	2,919	49.80%	1,239	21.14%	1,471	25.10%	142	2.42%	90	1.54%	1,448	24.71%	5,861
Clinton	3,633	39.55%	1,890	20.58%	3,188	34.71%	403	4.39%	71	0.77%	445	4.84%	9,185
Crawford	2,193	46.96%	1,169	25.03%	1,181	25.29%	66	1.41%	61	1.31%	1,012	21.67%	4,670
Dallas	1,718	32.73%	1,825	34.77%	1,361	25.93%	200	3.81%	145	2.76%	-107	-2.04%	5,249
Davis	1,453	47.41%	1,184	38.63%	353	11.52%	44	1.44%	31	1.01%	269	8.78%	3,065
Decatur	1,659	42.24%	1,351	34.39%	773	19.68%	90	2.29%	55	1.40%	308	7.84%	3,928
Delaware	1,399	34.42%	1,394	34.30%	1,145	28.17%	83	2.04%	43	1.06%	5	0.12%	4,064
Des Moines	3,169	39.30%	2,136	26.49%	2,090	25.92%	537	6.66%	132	1.64%	1,033	12.81%	8,064
Dickinson	502	26.96%	457	24.54%	850	45.65%	38	2.04%	15	0.81%	-348	-18.69%	1,862
Dubuque	6,237	53.20%	1,620	13.82%	3,421	29.18%	415	3.54%	31	0.26%	2,816	24.02%	11,724
Emmet	486	25.01%	602	30.98%	738	37.98%	99	5.10%	18	0.93%	-136 (Note: In this county where Wilson ran third behind both Taft and Roosevelt, margin given is Taft vote minus Roosevelt vote and percentage margin Taft percentage minus Roosevelt percentage.)	-7.00%	1,943
Fayette	2,379	38.20%	1,192	19.14%	2,240	35.97%	250	4.01%	166	2.67%	139	2.23%	6,227
Floyd	1,244	31.85%	1,216	31.13%	1,256	32.16%	142	3.64%	48	1.23%	-12	-0.31%	3,906
Franklin	694	22.64%	773	25.21%	1,403	45.76%	67	2.19%	129	4.21%	-630	-20.55%	3,066
Fremont	1,762	47.63%	973	26.30%	861	23.28%	65	1.76%	38	1.03%	789	21.33%	3,699
Greene	980	27.51%	1,324	37.17%	1,166	32.73%	29	0.81%	63	1.77%	158	4.44%	3,562
Grundy	1,149	37.12%	421	13.60%	1,465	47.33%	12	0.39%	48	1.55%	-316	-10.21%	3,095
Guthrie	1,390	33.93%	1,258	30.71%	1,303	31.80%	74	1.81%	72	1.76%	87	2.12%	4,097
Hamilton	1,041	24.27%	831	19.37%	2,282	53.19%	68	1.59%	68	1.59%	-1,241	-28.93%	4,290
Hancock	710	28.32%	860	34.30%	899	35.86%	8	0.32%	30	1.20%	-39	-1.56%	2,507
Hardin	1,072	24.07%	732	16.43%	2,362	53.03%	87	1.95%	201	4.51%	-1,290	-28.96%	4,454
Harrison	2,157	40.54%	1,528	28.72%	1,336	25.11%	226	4.25%	74	1.39%	629	11.82%	5,321
Henry	1,580	37.17%	1,663	39.12%	856	20.14%	47	1.11%	105	2.47%	-83	-1.95%	4,251
Howard	1,416	45.17%	750	23.92%	837	26.70%	69	2.20%	63	2.01%	579	18.47%	3,135
Humboldt	634	24.93%	477	18.76%	1,377	54.15%	16	0.63%	39	1.53%	-743	-29.22%	2,543
Ida	1,087	38.93%	530	18.98%	1,144	40.97%	18	0.64%	13	0.47%	-57	-2.04%	2,792
Iowa	1,841	45.77%	1,237	30.76%	875	21.76%	24	0.60%	45	1.12%	604	15.02%	4,022
Jackson	2,259	47.06%	1,174	24.46%	1,003	20.90%	109	2.27%	255	5.31%	1,085	22.60%	4,800
Jasper	2,487	39.20%	1,766	27.83%	1,531	24.13%	397	6.26%	164	2.58%	721	11.36%	6,345
Jefferson	1,311	35.80%	1,378	37.63%	786	21.46%	72	1.97%	115	3.14%	-67	-1.83%	3,662
Johnson	3,327	56.52%	1,645	27.95%	763	12.96%	92	1.56%	59	1.00%	1,682	28.58%	5,886
Jones	2,189	47.93%	1,622	35.52%	689	15.09%	34	0.74%	33	0.72%	567	12.42%	4,567
Keokuk	2,434	46.63%	1,361	26.07%	1,232	23.60%	74	1.42%	119	2.28%	1,073	20.56%	5,220
Kossuth	1,813	39.53%	857	18.69%	1,860	40.56%	21	0.46%	35	0.76%	-47	-1.02%	4,586
Lee	3,891	45.67%	2,016	23.66%	2,299	26.98%	258	3.03%	56	0.66%	1,592	18.69%	8,520
Linn	5,422	40.12%	4,326	32.01%	3,038	22.48%	487	3.60%	242	1.79%	1,096	8.11%	13,515
Louisa	881	29.94%	1,070	36.36%	891	30.28%	58	1.97%	43	1.46%	179	6.08%	2,943
Lucas	968	33.11%	939	32.11%	855	29.24%	110	3.76%	52	1.78%	29	0.99%	2,924
Lyon	896	32.27%	412	14.84%	1,361	49.01%	89	3.20%	19	0.68%	-465	-16.74%	2,777
Madison	1,185	31.43%	1,274	33.79%	1,121	29.73%	86	2.28%	104	2.76%	-89	-2.36%	3,770
Mahaska	2,576	39.95%	1,682	26.09%	1,705	26.44%	202	3.13%	283	4.39%	871	13.51%	6,448
Marion	2,276	43.31%	1,191	22.66%	1,419	27.00%	297	5.65%	72	1.37%	857	16.31%	5,255
Marshall	2,162	32.19%	926	13.79%	3,106	46.24%	324	4.82%	199	2.96%	-944	-14.05%	6,717
Mills	1,312	39.22%	850	25.41%	1,093	32.68%	57	1.70%	33	0.99%	219	6.55%	3,345
Mitchell	1,082	37.28%	590	20.33%	1,171	40.35%	29	1.00%	30	1.03%	-89	-3.07%	2,902
Monona	1,358	35.51%	1,109	29.00%	1,289	33.71%	36	0.94%	32	0.84%	69	1.80%	3,824
Monroe	1,485	28.11%	1,385	26.22%	1,495	28.30%	856	16.21%	61	1.15%	-10	-0.19%	5,282
Montgomery	1,206	30.35%	917	23.07%	1,713	43.11%	106	2.67%	32	0.81%	-507	-12.76%	3,974
Muscatine	2,679	37.68%	789	11.10%	2,796	39.32%	758	10.66%	88	1.24%	-117	-1.65%	7,110
O'Brien	1,506	38.91%	620	16.02%	1,659	42.87%	53	1.37%	32	0.83%	-153	-3.95%	3,870
Osceola	786	40.14%	520	26.56%	609	31.10%	29	1.48%	14	0.72%	177	9.04%	1,958
Page	1,462	29.32%	980	19.65%	2,216	44.44%	197	3.95%	132	2.65%	-754	-15.12%	4,987
Palo Alto	1,274	40.51%	953	30.30%	755	24.01%	101	3.21%	62	1.97%	321	10.21%	3,145
Plymouth	2,038	41.24%	825	16.69%	2,005	40.57%	28	0.57%	46	0.93%	33	0.67%	4,942
Pocahontas	1,176	35.52%	760	22.95%	1,277	38.57%	69	2.08%	29	0.88%	-101	-3.05%	3,311
Polk	7,239	32.07%	4,665	20.66%	8,110	35.92%	1,695	7.51%	866	3.84%	-871	-3.86%	22,575
Pottawattamie	4,993	42.08%	1,753	14.77%	4,538	38.24%	489	4.12%	93	0.78%	455	3.83%	11,866
Poweshiek	1,631	35.89%	902	19.85%	1,792	39.43%	107	2.35%	113	2.49%	-161	-3.54%	4,545
Ringgold	958	32.72%	916	31.28%	939	32.07%	45	1.54%	70	2.39%	19	0.65%	2,928
Sac	1,124	30.67%	622	16.97%	1,819	49.63%	58	1.58%	42	1.15%	-695	-18.96%	3,665
Scott	5,632	41.17%	1,568	11.46%	4,977	36.38%	1,444	10.56%	58	0.42%	655	4.79%	13,679
Shelby	1,841	47.78%	872	22.63%	1,073	27.85%	38	0.99%	29	0.75%	768	19.93%	3,853
Sioux	1,453	31.15%	575	12.33%	2,566	55.02%	55	1.18%	15	0.32%	-1,113	-23.86%	4,664
Story	1,224	23.39%	1,247	23.82%	2,515	48.05%	76	1.45%	172	3.29%	-1,268	-24.23%	5,234
Tama	2,446	44.76%	1,179	21.57%	1,722	31.51%	45	0.82%	73	1.34%	724	13.25%	5,465
Taylor	1,372	35.61%	1,364	35.40%	999	25.93%	40	1.04%	78	2.02%	8	0.21%	3,853
Union	1,528	39.25%	1,096	28.15%	1,115	28.64%	75	1.93%	79	2.03%	413	10.61%	3,893
Van Buren	1,495	39.68%	1,483	39.36%	675	17.91%	52	1.38%	63	1.67%	12	0.32%	3,768
Wapello	3,102	36.62%	2,755	32.53%	1,838	21.70%	699	8.25%	76	0.90%	347	4.10%	8,470
Warren	1,396	34.46%	1,386	34.21%	1,102	27.20%	53	1.31%	114	2.81%	10	0.25%	4,051
Washington	2,003	41.76%	1,264	26.35%	1,330	27.73%	84	1.75%	116	2.42%	673	14.03%	4,797
Wayne	1,581	41.93%	1,193	31.64%	796	21.11%	88	2.33%	113	3.00%	388	10.29%	3,771
Webster	2,370	33.25%	2,123	29.79%	2,171	30.46%	316	4.43%	147	2.06%	199	2.79%	7,127
Winnebago	390	17.48%	532	23.85%	1,035	46.39%	142	6.36%	132	5.92%	-503	-22.55%	2,231
Winneshiek	2,105	41.03%	802	15.63%	2,136	41.64%	61	1.19%	26	0.51%	-31	-0.60%	5,130
Woodbury	4,564	34.89%	2,441	18.66%	5,463	41.76%	449	3.43%	165	1.26%	-899	-6.87%	13,082
Worth	402	20.28%	354	17.86%	1,147	57.87%	42	2.12%	37	1.87%	-745	-37.59%	1,982
Wright	765	21.52%	805	22.64%	1,856	52.21%	54	1.52%	75	2.11%	-1,051	-29.56%	3,555
Total	185,325	37.64%	119,805	24.33%	161,819	32.87%	16,967	3.45%	8,440	1.71%	23,506	4.77%	492,356

== See also ==
- United States presidential elections in Iowa
