= West Holman Township, Osceola County, Iowa =

Township in Iowa, USA

Coordinates: 43°23′N 95°48′W

West Holman Township is a township in Osceola County, Iowa, United States.
