= Wilson Township, Osceola County, Iowa =

Township in Osceola County, Iowa, U.S.

Coordinates: 43.466°N 95.682°W

Wilson Township is a township in Osceola County, Iowa, United States. The township is home to Hawkeye Point, the highest natural point in Iowa, at 1,670 ft.

== History ==
Wilson Township was founded in 1872.
