= May City, Iowa =

- Unincorporated Community
- Location within Iowa Location within the United States
- Coordinates: 43°19′15″N 95°28′28″W
- Country: United States
- State: Iowa
- County: Osceola County
- Elevation: 1,427 ft (435 m)
- Time zone: UTC-6 (Central (CST))
  - Summer (DST): UTC-5 (CDT)
- Area code: 712
- GNIS feature ID: 458864

May City is an unincorporated community in Osceola County, Iowa, United States.

== Demographics ==
The population of May City was 43, according to the 2000 census.

== History ==
The town was created in 1889. May City's population was 27 in 1902, and was 35 in 1925. The population was 35 in 1940.

The town has a Lutheran church, St. John's. There is also a fire department in the town that is named "The May City Fire Department". The 125th Anniversary of the town was on July 19, 2014.

== Education ==
May City is served by the Hartley–Melvin–Sanborn Community School District.
