= Melvin, Iowa =

- City
- Location of Melvin, Iowa
- Coordinates: 43°17′11″N 95°36′31″W
- Country: USA
- State: Iowa
- County: Osceola

Area
  - Total: 0.16 sq mi (0.42 km^{2})
  - Land: 0.16 sq mi (0.42 km^{2})
  - Water: 0 sq mi (0.00 km^{2})
- Elevation: 1,578 ft (481 m)

Population (2020)
  - Total: 199
  - Density: 1,225.4/sq mi (473.14/km^{2})
- Time zone: UTC-6 (Central (CST))
  - Summer (DST): UTC-5 (CDT)
- ZIP code: 51350
- Area code: 712
- FIPS code: 19-51060
- GNIS feature ID: 2395091

Melvin is a city in Osceola County, Iowa, United States. The population was 199 at the time of the 2020 census.

== History ==
Melvin had its start in the year 1900 by the building of the Gowrie branch of the Rock Island Railroad through that territory.

Former location of the famous MARVIN robot, created by Iowa Precision Robotics in 1983. http://cyberneticzoo.com/tag/iowa-precision-robotics-ltd/

== Geography ==
According to the United States Census Bureau, the city has a total area of 0.18 square miles (0.47 km^{2}), all land.

== Demographics ==
Historical population
Census	Pop.	Note	%±
1910	195		—
1920	282		44.6%
1930	301		6.7%
1940	328		9.0%
1950	325		−0.9%
1960	364		12.0%
1970	325		−10.7%
1980	277		−14.8%
1990	250		−9.7%
2000	243		−2.8%
2010	214		−11.9%
2020	199		−7.0%
U.S. Decennial Census

=== 2020 census ===
As of the census of 2020, there were 199 people, 95 households, and 54 families residing in the city. The population density was 1,225.4 inhabitants per square mile (473.1/km^{2}). There were 117 housing units at an average density of 720.5 per square mile (278.2/km^{2}). The racial makeup of the city was 88.4% White, 0.0% Black or African American, 0.0% Native American, 0.0% Asian, 0.0% Pacific Islander, 4.0% from other races and 7.5% from two or more races. Hispanic or Latino persons of any race comprised 11.6% of the population.

Of the 95 households, 18.9% of which had children under the age of 18 living with them, 41.1% were married couples living together, 6.3% were cohabitating couples, 27.4% had a female householder with no spouse or partner present and 25.3% had a male householder with no spouse or partner present. 43.2% of all households were non-families. 36.8% of all households were made up of individuals, 14.7% had someone living alone who was 65 years old or older.

The median age in the city was 50.8 years. 20.6% of the residents were under the age of 20; 4.5% were between the ages of 20 and 24; 20.1% were from 25 and 44; 31.7% were from 45 and 64; and 23.1% were 65 years of age or older. The gender makeup of the city was 54.3% male and 45.7% female.

=== 2010 census ===
As of the census of 2010, there were 214 people, 109 households, and 63 families residing in the city. The population density was 1,188.9 inhabitants per square mile (459.0/km^{2}). There were 130 housing units at an average density of 722.2 per square mile (278.8/km^{2}). The racial makeup of the city was 97.7% White, 1.4% from other races, and 0.9% from two or more races. Hispanic or Latino of any race were 1.4% of the population.

There were 109 households, of which 18.3% had children under the age of 18 living with them, 45.9% were married couples living together, 8.3% had a female householder with no husband present, 3.7% had a male householder with no wife present, and 42.2% were non-families. 36.7% of all households were made up of individuals, and 12% had someone living alone who was 65 years of age or older. The average household size was 1.96 and the average family size was 2.48.

The median age in the city was 51.1 years. 14.5% of residents were under the age of 18; 7.1% were between the ages of 18 and 24; 17.7% were from 25 to 44; 40.2% were from 45 to 64; and 20.6% were 65 years of age or older. The gender makeup of the city was 48.6% male and 51.4% female.

=== 2000 census ===
As of the census of 2000, there were 243 people, 117 households, and 67 families residing in the city. The population density was 1,403.5 inhabitants per square mile (541.9/km^{2}). There were 134 housing units at an average density of 774.0 per square mile (298.8/km^{2}). The racial makeup of the city was 99.18% White and 0.82% Native American.

There were 117 households, out of which 20.5% had children under the age of 18 living with them, 53.0% were married couples living together, 3.4% had a female householder with no husband present, and 42.7% were non-families. 39.3% of all households were made up of individuals, and 27.4% had someone living alone who was 65 years of age or older. The average household size was 2.08 and the average family size was 2.82.

19.3% are under the age of 18, 4.9% from 18 to 24, 22.2% from 25 to 44, 19.8% from 45 to 64, and 33.7% who were 65 years of age or older. The median age was 47 years. For every 100 females, there were 96.0 males. For every 100 females age 18 and over, there were 84.9 males.

The median income for a household in the city was $27,750, and the median income for a family was $36,250. Males had a median income of $25,250 versus $18,250 for females. The per capita income for the city was $17,827. About 2.9% of families and 8.5% of the population were below the poverty line, including 18.4% of those under the age of eighteen and 7.9% of those 65 or over.

== Education ==
Melvin is served by the Hartley–Melvin–Sanborn Community School District, which formed on July 1, 1991, with the merger of the Hartley–Melvin and Sanborn districts. The predecessor Hartley–Melvin district formed on July 1, 1981, through the merger of the Hartley and Melvin districts.

Currently there are no school facilities in Melvin, not since Hartley and Melvin combined schools in 1980. Hartley–Melvin–Sanborn High School is the zoned high school.
