= Ocheyedan River =

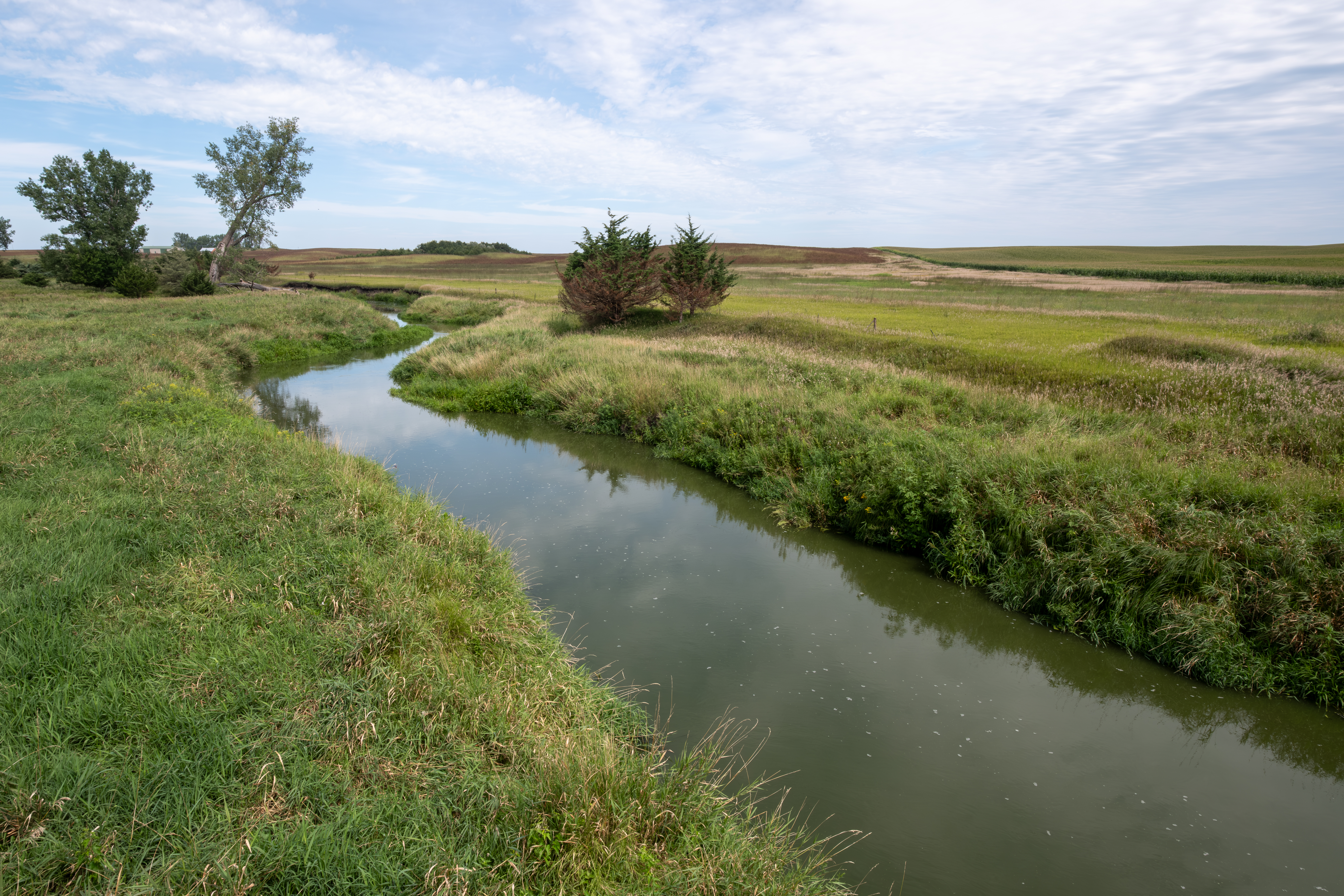
- The Ocheyedan River in Horton Township, Osceola County, Iowa

Location
- Country: United States
- State: Iowa, Minnesota
- Counties: Nobles County, Minnesota, Iowa: Clay, O'Brien, Osceola Counties

Physical characteristics
- Source
  - coordinates: 43°32′49″N 95°38′17″W
- Mouth: Little Sioux River
  - coordinates: 43°08′10″N 95°09′11″W
- Length: 58 mi (93 km)
- Discharge
  - location: Spencer, Iowa
  - average: 349 cu/ft. per sec. (median)

Basin features
- Progression: Ocheyedan River→ Little Sioux River→ Missouri River→ Mississippi River→ Gulf of Mexico
- River system: Missouri River

The Ocheyedan River is a tributary of the Little Sioux River, 58 mi (93 km) long, in southwestern Minnesota and northwestern Iowa in the United States. Via the Little Sioux and Missouri Rivers, it is part of the watershed of the Mississippi River. The river has been channelized for much of its length.

== Course ==
The Ocheyedan River flows from Ocheda Lake in Nobles County, Minnesota, 3 mi (4.8 km) south of Worthington, and generally flows southeastwardly through Osceola, O'Brien, and Clay Counties in Iowa. It joins the Little Sioux River at the town of Spencer.

In Osceola County, the river collects the short Little Ocheyedan River, which rises near Hawkeye Point (the highest elevation in Iowa) and flows southeastwardly.

== See also ==
- List of rivers of Iowa
- List of rivers of Minnesota
- List of longest streams of Minnesota
