= East Holman Township, Osceola County, Iowa =

Township in Iowa, USA

Coordinates: 43°23′N 95°41′W

East Holman Township is a township in Osceola County, Iowa, United States.
