= Ashton, Iowa =

- City
- Location of Ashton, Iowa
- Coordinates: 43°18′32″N 95°47′28″W
- Country: USA
- State: Iowa
- County: Osceola

Area
  - Total: 1.02 sq mi (2.63 km^{2})
  - Land: 1.01 sq mi (2.61 km^{2})
  - Water: 0.0039 sq mi (0.01 km^{2})
- Elevation: 1,447 ft (441 m)

Population (2020)
  - Total: 436
  - Density: 431.9/sq mi (166.77/km^{2})
- Time zone: UTC-6 (Central (CST))
  - Summer (DST): UTC-5 (CDT)
- ZIP code: 51232
- Area code: 712
- FIPS code: 19-03295
- GNIS feature ID: 2394003

Ashton is a city in Osceola County, Iowa, United States. The population was 436 at the 2020 census.

== History ==
Ashton was laid out in 1872 by the Sioux City & St. Paul Railroad. The city was named from a grove of white ash trees near the town site.

== Geography ==
According to the United States Census Bureau, the city has a total area of 1.02 square miles (2.64 km^{2}), of which 1.01 square miles (2.62 km^{2}) is land and 0.01 square miles (0.03 km^{2}) is water.

== Demographics ==
Historical population
Census	Pop.	Note	%±
1890	309		—
1900	513		66.0%
1910	518		1.0%
1920	610		17.8%
1930	568		−6.9%
1940	620		9.2%
1950	588		−5.2%
1960	615		4.6%
1970	483		−21.5%
1980	441		−8.7%
1990	462		4.8%
2000	461		−0.2%
2010	458		−0.7%
2020	436		−4.8%
U.S. Decennial Census

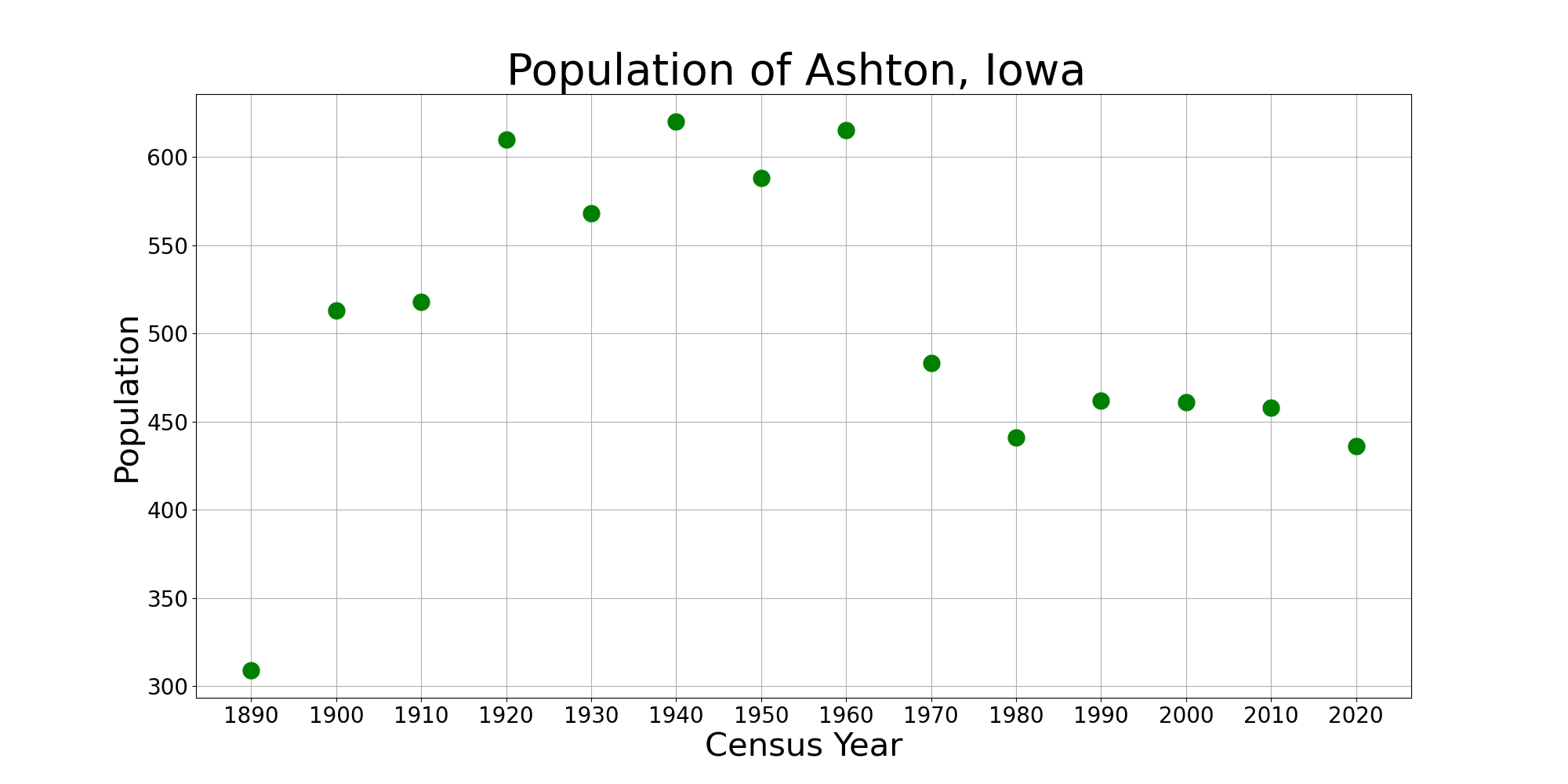
The population of Ashton, Iowa from US census data

=== 2020 census ===
As of the census of 2020, there were 436 people, 180 households, and 107 families residing in the city. The population density was 431.9 inhabitants per square mile (166.8/km^{2}). There were 203 housing units at an average density of 201.1 per square mile (77.6/km^{2}). The racial makeup of the city was 94.7% White, 0.7% Black or African American, 0.2% Native American, 0.0% Asian, 0.0% Pacific Islander, 2.8% from other races and 1.6% from two or more races. Hispanic or Latino persons of any race comprised 4.8% of the population.

Of the 180 households, 27.2% of which had children under the age of 18 living with them, 47.8% were married couples living together, 9.4% were cohabitating couples, 22.2% had a female householder with no spouse or partner present and 20.6% had a male householder with no spouse or partner present. 40.6% of all households were non-families. 35.0% of all households were made up of individuals, 13.3% had someone living alone who was 65 years old or older.

The median age in the city was 37.9 years. 30.0% of the residents were under the age of 20; 3.0% were between the ages of 20 and 24; 23.6% were from 25 and 44; 27.1% were from 45 and 64; and 16.3% were 65 years of age or older. The gender makeup of the city was 48.9% male and 51.1% female.

=== 2010 census ===
As of the census of 2010, there were 458 people, 191 households, and 124 families residing in the city. The population density was 453.5 inhabitants per square mile (175.1/km^{2}). There were 211 housing units at an average density of 208.9 per square mile (80.7/km^{2}). The racial makeup of the city was 95.0% White, 1.3% African American, 0.4% Native American, 0.2% Asian, 0.9% Pacific Islander, 0.7% from other races, and 1.5% from two or more races. Hispanic or Latino of any race were 3.1% of the population.

There were 191 households, of which 32.5% had children under the age of 18 living with them, 53.9% were married couples living together, 6.8% had a female householder with no husband present, 4.2% had a male householder with no wife present, and 35.1% were non-families. 28.8% of all households were made up of individuals, and 14.1% had someone living alone who was 65 years of age or older. The average household size was 2.40 and the average family size was 2.98.

The median age in the city was 37.7 years. 27.5% of residents were under the age of 18; 9.1% were between the ages of 18 and 24; 21.4% were from 25 to 44; 26% were from 45 to 64; and 15.9% were 65 years of age or older. The gender makeup of the city was 48.5% male and 51.5% female.

=== 2000 census ===
As of the census of 2000, there were 461 people, 192 households, and 126 families residing in the city. The population density was 458.6 inhabitants per square mile (177.1/km^{2}). There were 212 housing units at an average density of 210.9 per square mile (81.4/km^{2}). The racial makeup of the city was 99.13% White, 0.22% Native American, 0.22% Asian, and 0.43% from two or more races. Hispanic or Latino of any race were 0.65% of the population.

There were 192 households, out of which 33.3% had children under the age of 18 living with them, 58.3% were married couples living together, 3.6% had a female householder with no husband present, and 33.9% were non-families. 32.8% of all households were made up of individuals, and 18.2% had someone living alone who was 65 years of age or older. The average household size was 2.36 and the average family size was 3.01.

In the city, the population was spread out, with 27.3% under the age of 18, 7.8% from 18 to 24, 28.6% from 25 to 44, 18.4% from 45 to 64, and 17.8% who were 65 years of age or older. The median age was 36 years. For every 100 females, there were 84.4 males. For every 100 females age 18 and over, there were 88.2 males.

The median income for a household in the city was $29,821, and the median income for a family was $35,313. Males had a median income of $28,750 versus $17,045 for females. The per capita income for the city was $15,848. About 5.1% of families and 5.0% of the population were below the poverty line, including 4.7% of those under age 18 and 3.5% of those age 65 or over.

== Education ==
Ashton is served by the Sheldon Community School District.

== Notable person ==
- George F. Veenker, Iowa State football and Michigan basketball coach.
