= Sibley, Iowa =

- City
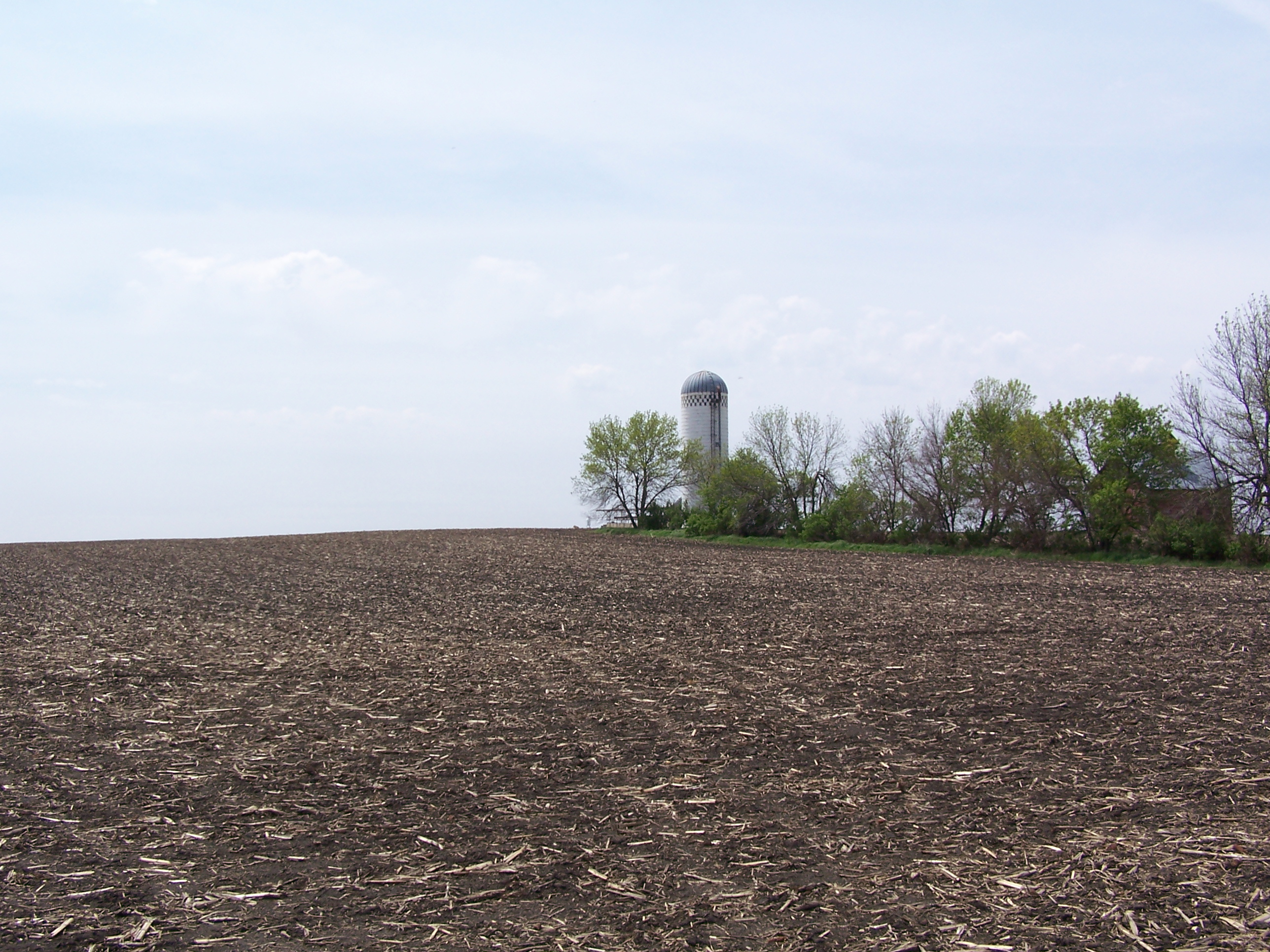
- Farmland in Sibley

- Location of Sibley, Iowa
- Coordinates: 43°24′01″N 95°44′56″W
- Country: USA
- State: Iowa
- County: Osceola

Government
  - Mayor: Jerry Johnson

Area
  - Total: 1.79 sq mi (4.63 km^{2})
  - Land: 1.79 sq mi (4.63 km^{2})
  - Water: 0 sq mi (0.00 km^{2})
- Elevation: 1,529 ft (466 m)

Population (2020)
  - Total: 2,860
  - Density: 1,601.5/sq mi (618.35/km^{2})
- Time zone: UTC-6 (Central (CST))
  - Summer (DST): UTC-5 (CDT)
- ZIP code: 51249
- Area code: 712
- FIPS code: 19-72975
- GNIS feature ID: 2395880
- Website: sibleyiowa.net

Sibley is a city and the county seat of Osceola County, Iowa, United States. The population was 2,860 at the time of the 2020 census. Hawkeye Point, the highest point in the State of Iowa, is also nearby.

== History ==
Sibley had its start in the year 1872 by the construction of the Sioux City & St. Paul Railroad through that territory. It is the oldest town in Osceola County.

Sibley is named after Henry Hastings Sibley, a prominent general during the Dakota War of 1862, who eventually became the first governor of Minnesota. William L. Harding, governor of Iowa from 1917 to 1921, was born in Sibley in 1877.

In March 2018, the city of Sibley lost a lawsuit brought against it by the ACLU. Local resident Josh Harms had criticized local officials for failing to stop the "rancid dog food" smell coming from a local pork blood processing plant, which he believed would dissuade people from moving to the town. The city of Sibley threatened to sue him and instructed him not to speak to the media about the issue. The ACLU successfully argued that this violated Harms' First Amendment rights to free speech. An injunction was granted, preventing Sibley's officials from "directing Harms not to speak with reporters, threatening to bring a lawsuit, or actually bringing a lawsuit against" Harms.

In September 2018, the city of Sibley was featured in an Esquire article by Ryan Lizza on dairy farms in the region that employ undocumented immigrants. Dairy farmers and their workers expressed concern that they might be raided by ICE. Indeed, the fear of such a raid was so acute that "[o]ne dairy farmer said . . . that [Western Iowa Dairy Alliance] members have discussed forming a NATO-like pact that would treat a raid on one dairy as a raid on all of them." Lizza's reporting received national attention and has been discussed in regional and national news outlets such as Mother Jones, The Des Moines Register, The Washington Post, The Daily Beast, Bloomberg, and Salon.

In 2025, it was reported that Sibley had no candidates on the ballot for their 2025 Mayoral Election and their City Ward 1 election. Sibley is one of a few cities in Iowa without mayoral candidates, including Chatsworth and Archer. This highlights a larger problem in rural and small town communities, as Aaron Lorch of the Osceola County Republican Party noted: "people in small agriculture-based communities are often busy year-round, so it’s hard for them to also get involved in public service", and that these communities may "lose out on our proper EMT service and first responders" due to a lack of people signing up.

Sibley resident and owner of Hibbing Lawncare and Landscaping Taylor Hibbing won the mayoral race on a write in campaign. He won 199 votes out of 381 votes cast, with Sandra Smith coming in second with 81 votes. Hibbing was unsure of what the job would entail, but was motivated to run for the office after the assassination of Charlie Kirk, and Susan Sembach at the city office gave Hibbing the details of the job.

== Geography ==
According to the United States Census Bureau, the city has a total area of 1.68 square miles (4.35 km^{2}), all land.

=== Climate ===
Climate data for Sibley, Iowa (1991−2020 normals, extremes 1893−present)
Month	Jan	Feb	Mar	Apr	May	Jun	Jul	Aug	Sep	Oct	Nov	Dec	Year
Record high °F (°C)	64 (18)	68 (20)	85 (29)	94 (34)	100 (38)	102 (39)	108 (42)	106 (41)	102 (39)	93 (34)	77 (25)	66 (19)	108 (42)
Mean maximum °F (°C)	43.1 (6.2)	49.2 (9.6)	66.6 (19.2)	80.0 (26.7)	88.8 (31.6)	92.4 (33.6)	91.2 (32.9)	90.4 (32.4)	88.0 (31.1)	82.4 (28.0)	64.0 (17.8)	46.9 (8.3)	94.7 (34.8)
Mean daily maximum °F (°C)	23.1 (−4.9)	28.0 (−2.2)	41.0 (5.0)	56.1 (13.4)	68.8 (20.4)	78.9 (26.1)	82.1 (27.8)	79.9 (26.6)	73.8 (23.2)	59.8 (15.4)	42.6 (5.9)	28.3 (−2.1)	55.2 (12.9)
Daily mean °F (°C)	13.9 (−10.1)	18.4 (−7.6)	30.8 (−0.7)	44.3 (6.8)	57.2 (14.0)	67.8 (19.9)	71.2 (21.8)	68.9 (20.5)	61.4 (16.3)	47.7 (8.7)	32.4 (0.2)	19.5 (−6.9)	44.5 (6.9)
Mean daily minimum °F (°C)	4.7 (−15.2)	8.8 (−12.9)	20.6 (−6.3)	32.5 (0.3)	45.5 (7.5)	56.7 (13.7)	60.3 (15.7)	57.9 (14.4)	49.1 (9.5)	35.7 (2.1)	22.3 (−5.4)	10.7 (−11.8)	33.7 (0.9)
Mean minimum °F (°C)	−18.0 (−27.8)	−12.0 (−24.4)	−2.8 (−19.3)	16.3 (−8.7)	30.3 (−0.9)	44.6 (7.0)	49.6 (9.8)	46.9 (8.3)	33.2 (0.7)	20.3 (−6.5)	3.0 (−16.1)	−11.0 (−23.9)	−21.0 (−29.4)
Record low °F (°C)	−40 (−40)	−40 (−40)	−30 (−34)	0 (−18)	15 (−9)	30 (−1)	37 (3)	30 (−1)	15 (−9)	3 (−16)	−20 (−29)	−32 (−36)	−40 (−40)
Average precipitation inches (mm)	0.74 (19)	0.84 (21)	1.59 (40)	3.25 (83)	4.06 (103)	4.88 (124)	3.30 (84)	3.58 (91)	3.25 (83)	2.31 (59)	1.38 (35)	1.05 (27)	30.23 (768)
Average snowfall inches (cm)	8.1 (21)	7.4 (19)	7.0 (18)	3.7 (9.4)	0.0 (0.0)	0.0 (0.0)	0.0 (0.0)	0.0 (0.0)	0.0 (0.0)	1.1 (2.8)	5.1 (13)	9.1 (23)	41.5 (105)
Average precipitation days (≥ 0.01 in)	6.0	5.3	6.3	9.5	12.9	11.6	8.9	8.8	8.4	7.8	5.1	5.9	96.5
Average snowy days (≥ 0.1 in)	5.5	4.5	3.1	1.3	0.1	0.0	0.0	0.0	0.0	0.5	2.5	4.9	22.4
Source: NOAA

== Demographics ==
Historical population
Census	Pop.	Note	%±
1880	301		—
1890	1,090		262.1%
1900	1,289		18.3%
1910	1,330		3.2%
1920	1,803		35.6%
1930	1,870		3.7%
1940	2,356		26.0%
1950	2,559		8.6%
1960	2,852		11.4%
1970	2,749		−3.6%
1980	3,051		11.0%
1990	2,815		−7.7%
2000	2,796		−0.7%
2010	2,798		0.1%
2020	2,860		2.2%
U.S. Decennial Census

=== 2020 census ===
As of the 2020 census, Sibley had a population of 2,860. The median age was 42.5 years. 22.5% of residents were under the age of 18. For every 100 females there were 93.2 males, and for every 100 females age 18 and over there were 89.2 males age 18 and over.

0.0% of residents lived in urban areas, while 100.0% lived in rural areas.

There were 1,177 households and 722 families in the city. Of the 1,177 households, 27.9% had children under the age of 18 living with them, 46.0% were married-couple households, 7.4% were cohabitating-couple households, 30.2% had a female householder with no spouse or partner present, and 16.4% had a male householder with no spouse or partner present. About 38.7% of all households were non-families; 33.1% were made up of individuals; and 18.5% had someone living alone who was 65 years old or older.

There were 1,262 housing units, of which 6.7% were vacant. The homeowner vacancy rate was 1.2% and the rental vacancy rate was 7.2%. The population density was 1,601.5 inhabitants per square mile (618.4/km^{2}), and housing unit density was 706.7 per square mile (272.9/km^{2}).

The age distribution was 24.7% under the age of 20; 6.3% from ages 20 to 24; 22.4% from ages 25 to 44; 24.2% from ages 45 to 64; and 22.4% age 65 or older.

Racial composition as of the 2020 census
Race	Number	Percent
White	2,357	82.4%
Black or African American	21	0.7%
American Indian and Alaska Native	26	0.9%
Asian	13	0.5%
Native Hawaiian and Other Pacific Islander	36	1.3%
Some other race	198	6.9%
Two or more races	209	7.3%
Hispanic or Latino (of any race)	454	15.9%

=== 2010 census ===
As of the census of 2010, there were 2,798 people, 1,153 households, and 724 families living in the city. The population density was 1,665.5 inhabitants per square mile (643.1/km^{2}). There were 1,269 housing units at an average density of 755.4 per square mile (291.7/km^{2}). The racial makeup of the city was 99.1% White, 0.3% African American, 0.3% Native American, 0.1% Asian, .2% from other races, and 0.7% from two or more races. Hispanic or Latino of any race were .4% of the population.

There were 1,153 households, of which 3.9% had children under the age of 18 living with them, 60.3% were married couples living together, 8.1% had a female householder with no husband present, 3.4% had a male householder with no wife present, and 37.2% were non-families. 33.2% of all households were made up of individuals, and 95.3% had someone living alone who was 65 years of age or older. The average household size was 23.33 and the average family size was 21.98.

The median age in the city was 44.9 years. 19.7% of residents were under the age of 18; 4.1% were between the ages of 20 and 24; 23.2% were from 25 to 44; 25.8% were from 45 to 64; and 24.1% were 65 years of age or older. The gender makeup of the city was 40.2% male and 59.8% female.

=== 2000 census ===
At the 2000 census, there were 2,796 people, 1,161 households and 743 families living in the city. The population density was 1,734.7 inhabitants per square mile (669.8/km^{2}). There were 1,244 housing units at an average density of 771.8 per square mile (298.0/km^{2}). The racial makeup of the city was 97.68% White, 0.21% African American, 0.32% Native American, 0.32% Asian, 0.02% Pacific Islander, 0.89% from other races, and 0.54% from two or more races. Hispanic or Latino of any race were 2.22% of the population.

There were 1,161 households, of which 28.6% had children under the age of 18 living with them, 54.8% were married couples living together, 7.0% had a female householder with no husband present, and 36.0% were non-families. 33.4% of all households were made up of individuals, and 19.9% had someone living alone who was 65 years of age or older. The average household size was 2.31 and the average family size was 2.95.

23.7% of the population were under the age of 18, 7.2% from 18 to 24, 25.0% from 25 to 44, 20.4% from 45 to 64, and 23.7% who were 65 years of age or older. The median age was 42 years. For every 100 females, there were 83.3 males. For every 100 females age 18 and over, there were 81.5 males.

The median household income was $33,173 and the median family income was $43,882. Males had a median income of $31,403 compared $21,633 for females. The per capita income for the city was $16,845. About 3.6% of families and 4.8% of the population were below the poverty line, including 2.3% of those under age 18 and 6.8% of those age 65 or over.

== Education ==
Sibley-Ocheyedan Community School District serves the community. The district formed on July 1, 1985 as a merger of the Sibley and Ocheyedan school districts.

== Transportation ==
=== Highways ===
- Iowa Highway 60 to Le Mars and Bigelow, Minnesota runs just outside city limits
- Iowa Highway 9 to Sioux Falls, South Dakota and Lansing, Iowa near the Wisconsin border passes about 1.5 miles north of the city

=== Rail ===
The Union Pacific Worthington Subdivision passes through Sibley en route from the Minneapolis area to Sioux City. The line sees about 4 trains per day. On May 16, 2021, 47 train cars carrying asphalt, hydrochloric acid, and potassium hydroxide derailed and caught fire in Sibley, leading to the evacuation of about 80 people.

== Notable people ==
- Dick Barber, an American long jumper, was born in Sibley and placed fifth in the 1932 Olympics
- Emory Collins, racing driver
- Robert W. Grow, commander of the U.S. 6th Armored Division on the Western Front (World War II)
- William Lloyd Harding (1877–1934) the 22nd governor of Iowa 1917–1921
- Jeff Hayenga, actor
- Devin Nunes, Congressmen from California lived in Sibley on a dairy farm
- Virginia Rich, food columnist and mystery writer
- William G. Steiner, nationally recognized expert on child abuse and neglect
- Barb Whitehead, golfer; member of Iowa Golf Hall of Fame
- John Wills, member of the Iowa House of Representatives
