= U.S. Route 59 in Iowa =

Segment of American highway

U.S. Highway 59
- US 59 highlighted in red

Route information
- Maintained by Iowa DOT
- Length: 215.191 mi (346.316 km)
- Existed: 1934–present

Major junctions
- South end: US 59 near Northboro
- US 34 near Emerson; US 6 near Oakland; I-80 at Avoca; US 30 at Denison; US 20 at Holstein; US 18 at Sanborn
- North end: US 59 near Bigelow, MN

Location
- Country: United States
- State: Iowa
- Counties: Fremont; Page; Mills; Pottawattamie; Shelby; Crawford; Ida; Cherokee; O'Brien; Osceola

Highway system
- United States Numbered Highway System; List; Special; Divided; Iowa Primary Highway System; Interstate; US; State; Secondary; Scenic
← Iowa 58	→ Iowa 60

U.S. Highway 59 (US 59) is a United States Highway that transverses the western third of Iowa. It begins at the Missouri state line southwest of Northboro and travels north in a zigzag pattern through Shenandoah, Avoca, Denison, and Cherokee. It ends at the Minnesota state line east of Bigelow, Minnesota. The highway was designated in 1934, although a concerted effort of community officials along today's route sought to bring a U.S. Highway to their cities for several years prior to US 59's creation.

== Route description ==
US 59 enters the state in southeastern Fremont County in southwest Iowa. It heads north for about ten miles (16 km) when it eases to the east and aligns with the Fremont–Page county line. Along that line, the highway enters Shenandoah where it meets Iowa 2 on the southern end of the town and Iowa 48 on the northern end. The road continues north along the county boundary, only ducking back into Fremont County shortly before entering Mills County. The highway heads due north until it reaches Emerson. There, the highway bears slightly to the west and crosses US 34. There is a one-quadrant interchange that joins US 59 and US 34 as the two routes do not meet directly.

The highway continues north on a straight line to Carson. There, there is a similar interchange with Iowa 92 as there was with US 34, except that these two routes are connected by a two-quadrant interchange. As the road approaches Oakland from the south, it is joined by US 6 from the west. The two routes run together into Oakland and then split as they exit the town's northeast side. The highway roughly follows the course of the West Nishnabotna River from there to Hancock. The highway has a short jog to the east and then returns to its northern course and into Avoca. In Avoca, the highway meets Iowa 83, which heads east toward Walnut and Atlantic. Prior to 2003, Iowa 83 continued west to Minden, but that roadway is now known as County Road G18 (CR G18). On the northern end of town, there is an interchange with I-80.

Buildings and structures around Ida Grove have a castle motif

North of I-80, US 59 enters Shelby County and into Harlan. It meets Iowa 44 there on the western side of the city. Continuing north, it meets Iowa 37 a few miles east of Earling. After curving around Defiance, the road enters Crawford County and then meets Iowa 141 from the east. The two routes head north for about seven miles (11 km) until they reach Denison. There, the two routes are overlapped by US 30 for about one-half mile (800 m). Near the Boyer River, Iowa 39 intersects the two highways. Just beyond the city limits of Denison, Iowa 141 splits off to the west as US 59 remains on a northwestern vector.

South of Schleswig, the highway straightens out to the north and stays in that direction until it reaches Iowa 175 east of Ida Grove. As the highways enter Ida Grove, there is an 8-acre (3.2 ha) manmade lake featuring a half-scale replica of HMS Bounty. The ship was commissioned by Ida Grove resident Byron Godbersen (1925–2003), who owned a manufacturing business in Ida Grove. Godbersen also built a few buildings and structures in a castle motif in order to stoke pride in the community. US 59 splits away from Iowa 175 on the outskirts of Ida Grove and heads north to US 20 near Holstein. The two roads overlap each other for about a mile before US 59 turns to the north once again.

North of Holstein, the highway continues north, intersecting Iowa 31 roughly at the midway point between US 20 and Cherokee. Just after crossing the Little Sioux River in downtown Cherokee, US 59 meets Main Street. Prior to 2003, Main Street east of US 59 was an unsigned highway that connected to Iowa 3 east of the city. On the northern edge of Cherokee lies a direct intersection with Iowa 3. North of Cherokee, the road winds until it reaches Larrabee, but then it straightens out again. Near Sutherland, the highway meets Iowa 10, which joins from the east. US 59 turns west onto Iowa 10; shortly thereafter, the roadway turns to the north and Iowa 10 splits off to the west. US 59 continues north through Primghar and on to US 18 at Sanborn. After a brief overlap of US 18, US 59 heads due north on a straight line for all but the last mile of its time in the state. It enters Osceola County near Melvin and intersects Iowa 9 just north of Allendorf. Just before the Minnesota state line, the roadway curves to the west slightly due to line up with section lines in Minnesota. US 59 enters Minnesota about 2 miles (3.2 km) east of where Iowa 60 crosses the state line. The two roads join up and continue north to Worthington, Minnesota.

== History ==
In 1985, the Iowa Department of Transportation catalogued named auto trails and published a map showing the paths of the most famous trails in the state. The vast majority of the current or historical routing of US 59 was not utilized by an auto trail. In 1919, the Iowa General Assembly passed a bill that created a fund for improving and hard-surfacing nearly 6,300 miles (10,100 km) of primary roads in the state. The primary road system was to connect every city and town with at least 1000 inhabitants. The bill gave Iowa's 99 counties the responsibility for maintaining the roads, which had previously fallen upon road associations that sponsored their respective highways. The new primary roads were assigned route numbers, a trend seen in other Midwestern states. Route numbers were painted onto telegraph and telephone poles in order to guide travelers without the need for maps.

Until the creation of Iowa Highway 73 in 1934, there was no one route that corresponded to US 59 today. Prior to that highway, the roadway was signed Iowa 4 from Hastings to Denison and then Iowa 21 north of Denison. Primary Road No. 4, which originally extended from the Missouri state line to Minnesota, had its northern end truncated at US 20 between Schaller and Early upon creation of the U.S. Highway System in 1926. US 71 followed the path of No. 4 from Early to Minnesota. Upon the creation of US 275 in 1931, the southern end of Iowa 4 was shifted east about 15 miles (24 km). The new routing absorbed part of Iowa 48 from the Missouri state line to Shenandoah. Iowa 73 itself was created as a result of efforts of communities along the route banding together to create the Highway 73 Commission, which promoted the idea to get U.S. Highway 73 routed through their communities. In 1931, the northern end of US 73 was at Nebraska City, Nebraska. The Highway 73 Commission sought to have US 73 routed across the Missouri River into Iowa, east to Sidney, and then north through Iowa, ultimately ending at Lake of the Woods on the Canada–United States border.

In early 1934, in order to attract the attention of the American Association of State Highway Officials (AASHO) who would decide the routing of US 73, the Iowa State Highway Commission and the Minnesota Department of Highways jointly designated the path they desired to be named US 73 as Highway 73 in each state. (Note: Comparison of 1933 and 1934 state highway maps in Minnesota and Iowa.) The number 73 was chosen because it fit the U.S. Highway numbering grid by lying between US 71 and US 75. There was already an Iowa 73 in east-central Iowa; that route was renumbered Iowa 212. Iowa 4 from Missouri to Denison and all of Iowa 21 became the new Iowa 73. At an AASHO meeting in November 1934, officials approved a new U.S. Highway along the Highway 73 corridor, though not with that number. An extension of US 73 was approved, but on the Nebraska side of the Missouri River north to Sioux City. In Kansas, there were two suffixed branches of US 73, US 73E and US 73W. These branches were replaced by US 69 and US 59, respectively. US 59 was chosen to be routed along the Highway 73 corridor through Iowa and to Lake of the Woods.

Though the Iowa State Highway Commission had declared Iowa to be "out of the mud," when US 59 was designated, it was mostly a gravel road. Only 55 of 230 miles (89 of 370 km), mostly between Avoca and Denison, were paved and 21 miles (34 km) between Shenandoah and Emerson was an unimproved dirt road. Paving was completed in piecemeal fashion and finally completed in 1960. The only major change to the route in recent years occurred in 1971 when a 15-mile (24 km) section between Harlan and Defiance was shifted west by one mile (1.6 km).

== Major intersections ==
County	Location	mi	km	Destinations	Notes
Fremont	Locust Grove Township	0.000	0.000	US 59 south – Tarkio	Continuation into Missouri
Fremont	Locust Grove Township	1.170	1.883	CR J64 – Northboro, Hamburg, College Springs	Former Iowa 333
Fremont–Page county line	Shenandoah	11.204	18.031	Iowa 2 – Sidney, Clarinda	
Fremont–Page county line	Shenandoah	13.211	21.261	Iowa 48 north	
Fremont–Page county line	Monroe–Pierce township line	20.007– 20.267	32.198– 32.617	CR J18 – Imogene	Former Iowa 184
Fremont	No major junctions				
Mills	Indian Creek Township	31.347	50.448	To US 34 – Red Oak, Glenwood	One-quadrant interchange
Mills	Anderson Township	39.323	63.284	CR H12 – Henderson	Former Iowa 244
Pottawattamie	Macedonia Township	42.547	68.473	CR G66 – Macedonia	Former Iowa 362
Pottawattamie	Carson Township	45.294	72.894	Iowa 92 – Carson, Griswold	Two-quadrant interchange
Pottawattamie	Belknap Township	49.183	79.152	US 6 west – Council Bluffs	Southern end of US 6 overlap
Pottawattamie	Oakland	51.590	83.026	US 6 east – Atlantic	Northern end of US 6 overlap
Pottawattamie	Avoca	64.075	103.119	Iowa 83 east / CR G18 west – Walnut, Minden	
Pottawattamie	Avoca	65.542	105.480	I-80 – Council Bluffs, Des Moines	
Shelby	Harlan	75.842	122.056	Iowa 44 – Harlan, Portsmouth	
Shelby	Westphalia–Union township line	84.928	136.678	Iowa 37 west – Earling, Dunlap	
Crawford	Washington Township	93.992	151.265	Iowa 141 east – Manilla, Manning	Southern end of Iowa 141 overlap
Crawford	Denison	101.139	162.767	US 30 west – Dunlap	Southern end of US 30 overlap
Crawford	Denison	101.617	163.537	US 30 east – Carroll	Northern end of US 30 overlap
Crawford	Denison	102.231	164.525	Iowa 39 north – Odebolt	
Crawford	Denison–Goodrich township line	104.225	167.734	Iowa 141 west – Charter Oak	Northern end of Iowa 141 overlap
Ida	Corwin–Blaine township line	125.321	201.685	Iowa 175 east – Odebolt	Southern end of Iowa 175 overlap
Ida	Corwin Township	128.973	207.562	Iowa 175 west – Battle Creek	Northern end of Iowa 175 overlap
Ida	Logan–Griggs township line	137.839	221.830	US 20 east – Sac City	Southern end of US 20 overlap
Ida	Holstein	139.206	224.030	US 20 west – Moville	Northern end of US 20 overlap
Cherokee	Silver Township	150.335	241.941	Iowa 31 south – Quimby	
Cherokee	Cherokee	158.337	254.819	Main Street	Former Iowa 977
Cherokee	Cherokee	159.904	257.341	Iowa 3 – Marcus, Pocahontas	
O'Brien	Liberty Township	172.062	276.907	CR B60 – Calumet	Former Iowa 388
O'Brien	Liberty Township	173.563	279.323	Iowa 10 east – Sutherland	Southern end of Iowa 10 overlap
O'Brien	Union–Liberty township line	178.437	287.167	Iowa 10 west – Paullina	Northern end of Iowa 10 overlap
O'Brien	Franklin–Lincoln township line	192.444	309.709	US 18 east – Spencer	Southern end of US 18 overlap
O'Brien	Sanborn	193.440	311.312	US 18 west – Sanborn	Northern end of US 18 overlap
Osceola	Goewey Township	200.444	322.583	CR A48 – Melvin	Former Iowa 313
Osceola	East Holman–Wilson township line	210.472	338.722	Iowa 9 – Ocheyedan, Little Rock	
Osceola	Wilson Township	215.191	346.316	US 59 north – Worthington	Continuation into Minnesota
1.000 mi = 1.609 km; 1.000 km = 0.621 mi: Concurrency terminus

== Notes ==
U.S. Route 59
Previous state: Missouri	Iowa	Next state: Minnesota
