= Iowa Highway 10 =

State highway in Iowa, United States

Iowa Highway 10
- Iowa 10 highlighted in red

Route information
- Maintained by Iowa DOT
- Length: 104.512 mi (168.196 km)

Major junctions
- West end: SD 46 near Hawarden
- US 75 near Maurice; Iowa 60 at Alton; US 59 near Sutherland; US 71 near Sioux Rapids
- East end: Iowa 4 in Havelock

Location
- Country: United States
- State: Iowa
- Counties: Sioux; O'Brien; Clay; Buena Vista; Pocahontas

Highway system
- Iowa Primary Highway System; Interstate; US; State; Secondary; Scenic
← Iowa 9	→ Iowa 11

Iowa Highway 10 (Iowa 10) is a state highway that runs 104 1/2 miles (168.2 km) across the state of Iowa. It begins where South Dakota Highway 46 crosses the Big Sioux River into Iowa north of Hawarden. It ends east of Havelock at an intersection with Iowa Highway 4.

== Description ==
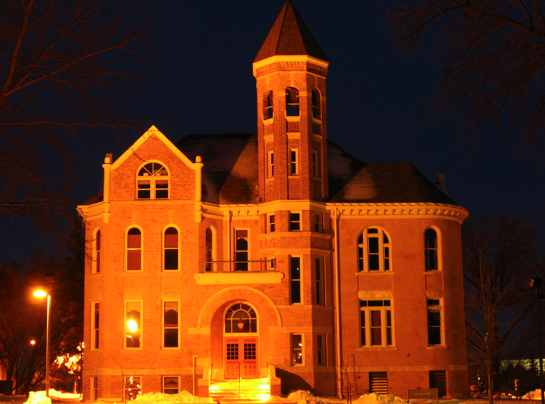
Zwemer Hall at Northwestern College in Orange City is on Iowa 10.

Iowa Highway 10 begins by going south towards Hawarden. At Hawarden, it intersects Iowa Highway 12, then turns east. Before entering Orange City, Iowa 10 intersects U.S. Highway 75. After Orange City, it enters Alton, meeting Iowa Highway 60. It continues east through Granville and meets Iowa Highway 143 before entering Paullina. After Paullina, Iowa 10 then runs concurrent for 5 miles (8.0 km) with U.S. Highway 59. They separate and Iowa 10 then enters Sutherland. Iowa 10 turns slightly southeast to go through Peterson, then continues east until intersecting U.S. Highway 71. Iowa 10 then goes south with U.S. 71, passing through Sioux Rapids before turning east again. Iowa 10 then passes through Marathon, Laurens and Havelock before ending at Iowa Highway 4 shortly after Havelock.

== History ==
Iowa Highway 10 was designated as a state highway in 1920. It crossed Iowa from west to east, going from Hawarden to McGregor. It was shortened to Strawberry Point in 1926, then extended to Luxemburg in 1930 and Dubuque in 1939. In 1945, the highway was shortened to Pocahontas and in 1969, was shortened to its current eastern terminus.

== Major intersections ==
County	Location	mi	km	Destinations	Notes
Big Sioux River		0.000	0.000	SD 46 west – Beresford	Continuation into South Dakota
Big Sioux River		0.000	0.000	South Dakota–Iowa state line	
Sioux	Hawarden	3.788	6.096	Iowa 12 south (Avenue E) – Akron, Alcester, S.D.	
Sioux	Center–Reading township line	12.668	20.387	CR K30 – Ireton	Former Iowa 231
Sioux	Sherman–West Branch township line	19.624	31.582	US 75 – Sioux Center, Le Mars	
Sioux	Alton	28.320	45.577	3rd Avenue	Former Iowa 60
Sioux	Alton	28.653	46.113	Iowa 450 to Iowa 60 – Sioux City, Worthington, Minn.	
O'Brien	Caledonia Township	39.518	63.598	Iowa 143 south – Marcus	
O'Brien	Union–Liberty township line	48.497	78.048	US 59 north – Primghar	Western end of US 59 overlap
O'Brien	Liberty Township	53.372	85.894	US 59 south – Cherokee	Eastern end of US 59 overlap
Clay	Peterson Township	70.426	113.340	CR M36 – Linn Grove	Former Iowa 264
Clay	Douglas Township	74.928	120.585	US 71 north – Spencer	Western end of US 71 overlap
Buena Vista	Barnes–Lee township line	80.114	128.931	US 71 south / CR C16 west – Storm Lake	Eastern end of US 71 overlap
Buena Vista	Poland Township	88.667	142.696	S. Agora Street – Marathon	Former Iowa 390
Pocahontas	Cummins Township	104.513	168.197	Iowa 4 – Pocahontas, Mallard	
1.000 mi = 1.609 km; 1.000 km = 0.621 mi

== Related route ==
Iowa Highway 450
- Location: Alton
- Length: 0.268 mi (431 m)

In Alton, Iowa 450 is a 0.27-mile-long (430 m) route which provides a direct connection between Iowa 10 and Iowa 60. It was designated when Iowa 60 moved onto a four-lane bypass of Alton. Prior to the construction of the bypass, the two routes which Iowa 450 connect intersected in Alton.
