= Lincoln Township, O'Brien County, Iowa =

Township in O'Brien County, Iowa, U.S.

Lincoln Township is a township in O'Brien County, Iowa, United States.

== Geography ==
Lincoln Township is bordered by Hartley Township on the east, Franklin Township to the west, Center Township to the south, and Osceola County, Iowa to the north. Its total area is 35.5 square miles, and its elevation is 1,530 feet. Floyd River runs through the township, and Waterman Creek is the main drainage outlet.

== Demographics ==
As of the 2020 census, the population of Lincoln Township was 195. Of those, 189 were white, one was black, one was some other race, and four were two or more races. As of the 2019 American Community Survey, eight residents were Hispanic or Latino of any race.

== History ==
Lincoln Township was formed out of part of Waterman Township after its population grew and it became necessary to divide the township. In April 1878, the board of supervisors of O'Brien County created Lincoln Township, and the first elections were held in September of that year. House File 390, which officially established Lincoln Township, was passed by the Iowa House of Representatives in 1886. The first settlers moved to Lincoln Township from Hardin County, Iowa, in 1870. In 1881, the population of the township was 36; in 1885, 53; and in 1914, around 185. A branch of the Burlington, Cedar Rapids and Northern Railway used to run through the northwest part of the township, with a station at Plessis.

== Government ==
Lincoln Township is represented in the United States House of Representatives by Republican Randy Feenstra of Iowa's 4th congressional district. It is represented in the Iowa Senate by Republican Lynn Evans of District 3, and in the Iowa House of Representatives by Republican Zach Dieken of District 5. In the O'Brien County Board of Supervisors, Lincoln Township is represented by Timothy Overmire of District 1. As of February 2024, the township clerk was Harv Westerman, and the township trustees were Tom Gonnerman, Joel Wright, and Glen Van Meeteren.

== Education ==
Lincoln Township is in the Hartley–Melvin–Sanborn Community School District.
