= Primghar, Iowa =

- City
- Location of Primghar, Iowa
- Coordinates: 43°05′13″N 95°37′28″W
- Country: USA
- State: Iowa
- County: O'Brien
- Established: 2012

Government
  - Type: Mayor-council

Area
  - Total: 1.34 sq mi (3.48 km^{2})
  - Land: 1.34 sq mi (3.48 km^{2})
  - Water: 0 sq mi (0.00 km^{2})
- Elevation: 1,509 ft (460 m)

Population (2020)
  - Total: 896
  - Density: 667.1/sq mi (257.55/km^{2})
- Time zone: UTC-6 (Central (CST))
  - Summer (DST): UTC-5 (CDT)
- ZIP code: 51245
- Area code: 712
- FIPS code: 19-64650
- GNIS feature ID: 2396276
- Website: www.primghariowa.org

Primghar is a city in, and the county seat of, O'Brien County, Iowa, United States. The population was 896 at the time of the 2020 census. Primghar is 23.5 miles south of Iowa State Highway 9, 28 miles east of Sioux Center, and 6.75 miles north of Iowa State Highway 10.

== History ==
In a brief history of O'Brien County, Arthur M. Schierholz states: "the courthouse location in (the county of) O'Brien in the extreme southeast corner of the county became a growing issue. To resolve the matter, an election was held on November 11, 1872, to determine the location of the courthouse." A total of 360 votes were cast, with 307 voting to move the courthouse to the exact geographical center of the county. Another historian wrote, "Probably the only case in Iowa, perhaps anywhere, where a bare spot of raw prairie was actually voted to be the county seat." This eventually became the town of Primghar. The present O'Brien County Courthouse was completed in 1917. The name Primghar was received from the first letter of eight people (Pumphrey, Roberts, Inman, McCormack, Green, Hayes, Albright, Rerick) who had a major part in platting the town.

== Geography ==
According to the United States Census Bureau, the city has a total area of 1.38 square miles (3.57 km^{2}), all land.

=== Roads and highways ===
The only major highway that passes through Primghar is U.S. 59, going north–south. B40 road runs east–west through the town.

=== Topography ===
Primghar lies at an elevation of 1520 feet. This area of northwest Iowa is gently rolling. Today, fields are marred by a few boggy areas, and much of the land is terraced to reduce erosion. Until fill was hauled in, the south side of the courthouse square was a "boggy, muddy slough." When the first settlers arrived, there were few trees, and almost without exception, prairie grass grew to six feet.

In the immediate vicinity of Primghar, the topsoils and subsoils are silty clay loam. (Galva, Marcus, Primghar, and Sac soils by name.) Clay loam glacial till is at a depth of 30 to 60 inches in most places. There are no mineral assets of commercial value, save rock and gravel. Back in 1873, this dearth of underground wealth was yet to be decided. There was a $1000 reward posted for anyone finding mineable coal reserves. No one claimed the prize.

There is an abandoned rock quarry, one mile south-southeast of Primghar, which was donated by the Tjossem family to Primghar in 1989 and is now known as Tjossem Park, a fishing area and public picnic/campground.

=== Climate ===
Climate data for Primghar, Iowa (1991−2020 normals, extremes 1895−present)
Month	Jan	Feb	Mar	Apr	May	Jun	Jul	Aug	Sep	Oct	Nov	Dec	Year
Record high °F (°C)	64 (18)	70 (21)	87 (31)	93 (34)	100 (38)	103 (39)	110 (43)	101 (38)	100 (38)	93 (34)	78 (26)	66 (19)	110 (43)
Mean maximum °F (°C)	43.9 (6.6)	49.6 (9.8)	67.8 (19.9)	80.6 (27.0)	87.9 (31.1)	91.7 (33.2)	92.2 (33.4)	90.9 (32.7)	87.6 (30.9)	81.1 (27.3)	64.8 (18.2)	48.1 (8.9)	94.4 (34.7)
Mean daily maximum °F (°C)	26.7 (−2.9)	31.8 (−0.1)	45.5 (7.5)	60.5 (15.8)	71.9 (22.2)	81.5 (27.5)	84.6 (29.2)	82.0 (27.8)	76.2 (24.6)	62.4 (16.9)	45.3 (7.4)	31.4 (−0.3)	58.3 (14.6)
Daily mean °F (°C)	18.0 (−7.8)	22.8 (−5.1)	35.6 (2.0)	48.7 (9.3)	60.6 (15.9)	70.7 (21.5)	74.3 (23.5)	71.9 (22.2)	64.7 (18.2)	51.3 (10.7)	36.0 (2.2)	23.3 (−4.8)	48.2 (9.0)
Mean daily minimum °F (°C)	9.4 (−12.6)	13.8 (−10.1)	25.6 (−3.6)	36.9 (2.7)	49.3 (9.6)	59.9 (15.5)	63.9 (17.7)	61.8 (16.6)	53.2 (11.8)	40.3 (4.6)	26.7 (−2.9)	15.3 (−9.3)	38.0 (3.3)
Mean minimum °F (°C)	−15.6 (−26.4)	−11.3 (−24.1)	0.5 (−17.5)	19.1 (−7.2)	32.9 (0.5)	47.0 (8.3)	52.0 (11.1)	50.0 (10.0)	35.6 (2.0)	21.1 (−6.1)	5.9 (−14.5)	−9.1 (−22.8)	−19.0 (−28.3)
Record low °F (°C)	−30 (−34)	−38 (−39)	−20 (−29)	2 (−17)	22 (−6)	34 (1)	40 (4)	38 (3)	17 (−8)	8 (−13)	−14 (−26)	−28 (−33)	−38 (−39)
Average precipitation inches (mm)	0.82 (21)	0.89 (23)	1.70 (43)	3.30 (84)	4.11 (104)	4.98 (126)	3.88 (99)	3.58 (91)	3.30 (84)	2.28 (58)	1.49 (38)	1.02 (26)	31.35 (796)
Average snowfall inches (cm)	8.4 (21)	6.7 (17)	6.2 (16)	2.4 (6.1)	0.0 (0.0)	0.0 (0.0)	0.0 (0.0)	0.0 (0.0)	0.0 (0.0)	0.4 (1.0)	2.5 (6.4)	8.2 (21)	34.8 (88)
Average precipitation days (≥ 0.01 in)	3.7	4.2	5.1	8.0	10.8	9.8	7.1	7.0	6.8	6.1	4.5	4.1	77.2
Average snowy days (≥ 0.1 in)	3.4	3.1	1.8	0.7	0.0	0.0	0.0	0.0	0.0	0.2	1.6	3.3	14.1
Source: NOAA

== Demographics ==
Historical population
Census	Pop.	Note	%±
1880	143		—
1890	519		262.9%
1900	814		56.8%
1910	733		−10.0%
1920	921		25.6%
1930	962		4.5%
1940	1,081		12.4%
1950	1,152		6.6%
1960	1,131		−1.8%
1970	995		−12.0%
1980	1,050		5.5%
1990	950		−9.5%
2000	891		−6.2%
2010	909		2.0%
2020	896		−1.4%
U.S. Decennial Census

=== 2020 census ===
As of the census of 2020, there were 896 people, 381 households, and 237 families residing in the city. The population density was 667.0 inhabitants per square mile (257.5/km^{2}). There were 421 housing units at an average density of 313.4 per square mile (121.0/km^{2}). The racial makeup of the city was 93.3% White, 1.0% Black or African American, 0.3% Native American, 0.6% Asian, 0.0% Pacific Islander, 1.3% from other races, and 3.5% from two or more races. Hispanic or Latino persons of any race comprised 3.8% of the population.

Of the 381 households, 31.2% of which had children under the age of 18 living with them, 47.2% were married couples living together, 7.6% were cohabiting couples, 26.8% had a female householder with no spouse or partner present, and 18.4% had a male householder with no spouse or partner present. 37.8% of all households were non-families. 32.0% of all households were made up of individuals, 13.6% had someone living alone who was 65 years old or older.

The median age in the city was 42.3 years. 23.5% of the residents were under the age of 20; 6.9% were between the ages of 20 and 24; 23.2% were from 25 to 44; 24.8% were from 45 to 64; and 21.5% were 65 years of age or older. The gender makeup of the city was 52.6% male and 47.4% female.

=== 2010 census ===
As of the census of 2010, there were 909 people, 392 households, and 247 families residing in the city. The population density was 658.7 inhabitants per square mile (254.3/km^{2}). There were 444 housing units at an average density of 321.7 per square mile (124.2/km^{2}). The racial makeup of the city was 96.5% White, 0.3% African American, 0.3% Native American, 0.4% Asian, 0.9% from other races, and 1.5% from two or more races. Hispanics or Latinos of any race were 2.2% of the population.

There were 392 households, of which 28.3% had children under the age of 18 living with them, 50.0% were married couples living together, 8.9% had a female householder with no husband present, 4.1% had a male householder with no wife present, and 37.0% were non-families. 33.9% of all households were made up of individuals, and 18.4% had someone living alone who was 65 years of age or older. The average household size was 2.19, and the average family size was 2.77.

The median age in the city was 43.9 years. 23.8% of residents were under the age of 18; 5.2% were between the ages of 18 and 24; 22.4% were from 25 to 44; 25.4% were from 45 to 64; and 23.3% were 65 years of age or older. The gender makeup of the city was 47.7% male and 52.3% female.

=== 2000 census ===
As of the census of 2000, there were 891 people, 391 households, and 233 families residing in the city. The population density was 643.9 inhabitants per square mile (248.6/km^{2}). There were 437 housing units at an average density of 315.8 per square mile (121.9/km^{2}). The racial makeup of the city was 98.20% White, 0.11% Native American, 1.12% Asian, 0.11% from other races, and 0.45% from two or more races. Hispanics or Latinos of any race were 0.79% of the population.

There were 391 households, out of which 26.1% had children under the age of 18 living with them, 51.4% were married couples living together, 5.4% had a female householder with no husband present, and 40.4% were non-families. 36.6% of all households were made up of individuals, and 24.6% had someone living alone who was 65 years of age or older. The average household size was 2.17, and the average family size was 2.86.

21.5% are under the age of 18, 6.5% from 18 to 24, 21.7% from 25 to 44, 21.9% from 45 to 64, and 28.4% who were 65 years of age or older. The median age was 45 years. For every 100 females, there were 89.2 males. For every 100 females age 18 and over, there were 82.5 males.

The median income for a household in the city was $31,304, and the median income for a family was $40,982. Males had a median income of $30,134 versus $20,694 for females. The per capita income for the city was $17,791. About 5.2% of families and 9.6% of the population were below the poverty line, including 9.8% of those under age 18 and 6.7% of those age 65 or over.

== Education ==
Primghar is served by the South O'Brien Community School District. The district was formed on July 1, 1993, by the merger of three school districts: Paullina, Primghar, and Sutherland. Primghar houses the South O'Brien Elementary School.

== Transportation ==
The transportation for Primghar is by road (U.S. 59, B40 road) or by air (Primghar Airport).

== Notable people ==
- Keli McGregor (1963–2010), former NFL player and president of the Colorado Rockies baseball team.
- Rick and Michael Mast, founders of Mast Brothers chocolate.
- Joseph Welch (1890–1960), special counsel to the United States Army during the Army-McCarthy hearings, in 1954.
