= Josh Stamer =

American football player (born 1977)

No. 57, 50, 53
- Position: Linebacker

Personal information
- Born: October 11, 1977 (age 49); Sutherland, Iowa, U.S.
- Listed height: 6 ft 2 in (1.88 m)
- Listed weight: 242 lb (110 kg)

Career information
- High school: South O'Brien (Paullina, Iowa)
- College: South Dakota
- NFL draft: 2001: undrafted

Career history
- New York Giants (2001–2002)*; Amsterdam Admirals (2002); Seattle Seahawks (2002)*; Buffalo Bills (2003–2007); Tennessee Titans (2008); Cleveland Browns (2009); Buffalo Bills (2009)
- * Offseason or practice squad member only

Awards and highlights
- Second-team All-Midwest Region (2000); Cactus Bowl West All-Star team (2000)

Career NFL statistics
- Total tackles: 78
- Pass deflections: 3
- Interceptions: 1
- Stats at Pro Football Reference

Joshua Lee Stamer (born October 11, 1977), is an American former professional football player who was a linebacker in the National Football League (NFL). He was signed by the New York Giants as an undrafted free agent in 2001. He played college football and college basketball for the South Dakota Coyotes.

Stamer was also a member of the Amsterdam Admirals of NFL Europe, Seattle Seahawks, Buffalo Bills, Tennessee Titans and Cleveland Browns.

== Early life ==
Stammer was born to Mary Nilles McClaren and Terry Stamer. He attended Sutherland Grade and Middle school with cousin Christopher James Nilles in Sutherland, Iowa and graduated from South O'Brien High School in Paullina, Iowa, in 1996. He was a letterman in football, basketball, baseball, and track. He was also an All-State honoree in football and track.

Stamer went to the University of South Dakota and was a walk-on to the basketball team before becoming a walk-on to the football team. During his time on the football team, Stamer registered 152 tackles, 15.5 sacks and 36 tackles-for-loss in his three seasons for the Coyotes. He went on to earn a scholarship in his final two years, before graduating from the business school with a master's degree in accounting. He was inducted into the Coyote Sports Hall of Fame in 2014. Stamer is active in numerous NFL United Way charity causes and others such as the American Red Cross LIFE Project.
