= Kiwa =

Kiwa or KIWA may refer to:

- Kiwa, Mie, Japan
- KIWA (music producer), Finland
- Kiwa NV a European institution for Testing and Certification
- Kiwa (artist), Estonian artist and writer
- Kiwa (mythology), a guardian of the sea in Māori tradition
- Kiwa (crustacean), a genus of deep-sea crustaceans
- Koreatown Immigrant Workers Alliance, an immigrant worker organization in Los Angeles, United States
- the ICAO airport code for Phoenix–Mesa Gateway Airport in Mesa, Arizona
- KIWA (AM), a radio station (1550 AM) licensed to Sheldon, Iowa, United States
- KIWA-FM, a radio station (105.3 FM) licensed to Sheldon, Iowa, United States

== People with the surname ==
- Teiko Kiwa (1902–1983), Japanese-Dutch opera singer
