= Iowa Highway 143 =

State highway in Iowa, United States

Iowa Highway 143
- Iowa 143 highlighted in red

Route information
- Maintained by Iowa DOT
- Length: 12.049 mi (19.391 km)
- Existed: 1926–present

Major junctions
- South end: Iowa 3 near Marcus
- North end: Iowa 10 near Granville

Location
- Country: United States
- State: Iowa
- Counties: Cherokee, O'Brien

Highway system
- Iowa Primary Highway System; Interstate; US; State; Secondary; Scenic
← Iowa 141	→ Iowa 144

Iowa Highway 143 (Iowa 143) is a north–south state highway in northwestern Iowa. The highway is 12 miles (19 km) long. The route was designated in 1926 when its original number, Primary Road No. 75 was reused for U.S. Highway 75. It was originally a short spur route into Marcus, but was extended north to Iowa 10 in 1938. From 1941 to 1961, the highway extended south from Iowa 3 / Iowa 5 to the Cherokee–Woodbury county line.

== Route description ==
Iowa 143 begins at an intersection with Iowa 3 at the southeastern corner of the city limits of Marcus. Iowa 3, an east–west highway, meets D Avenue, which carries County Road L36 (CR L36) south of the intersection and Iowa 143 north. Heading north through Marcus along Ames Street, the highway passes a municipal golf course, cemetery, and high school. The residential area of Marcus ends abruptly at a Chicago Central and Pacific Railroad line on the northern edge of town.

North of Marcus, the route runs due north on a two-lane road through the farmland of rural Cherokee and O'Brien counties. The terrain is flat, only rising and falling between 1,420 and 1,470 feet (430 and 450 m) in elevation. Two miles (3.2 km) before the northern end of the highway, it intersects CR B60, which leads to Germantown. Iowa 143 ends at an intersection with Iowa 10 between Granville and Paullina. The roadway continues north as CR L36.

== History ==
The road that would become Iowa 143 was called Primary Road No. 75 (No. 75) when the Primary Highway System was created in 1920; it was a short spur route that connected No. 5 to Marcus. When the U.S. Highway System was created in 1926, No. 75 became Iowa 143 as the 75 designation was applied to U.S. Highway 75. The spur was paved in mid-1937.

In 1941, the highway extended south to the Cherokee–Woodbury county line north of Correctionville. In the early 1960s, Iowa 143 was paved between Marcus and Iowa 10, while the segment south of Iowa 3 / Iowa 5 was turned over to Cherokee County.

== Major intersections ==
County	Location	mi	km	Destinations	Notes
Cherokee	Marcus	0.000	0.000	Iowa 3 – Cherokee, Remsen	
O'Brien	Caledonia Township	12.049	19.391	Iowa 10 – Granville, Paullina	
1.000 mi = 1.609 km; 1.000 km = 0.621 mi
