= O'Brien County, Iowa =

County in Iowa, United States

- County
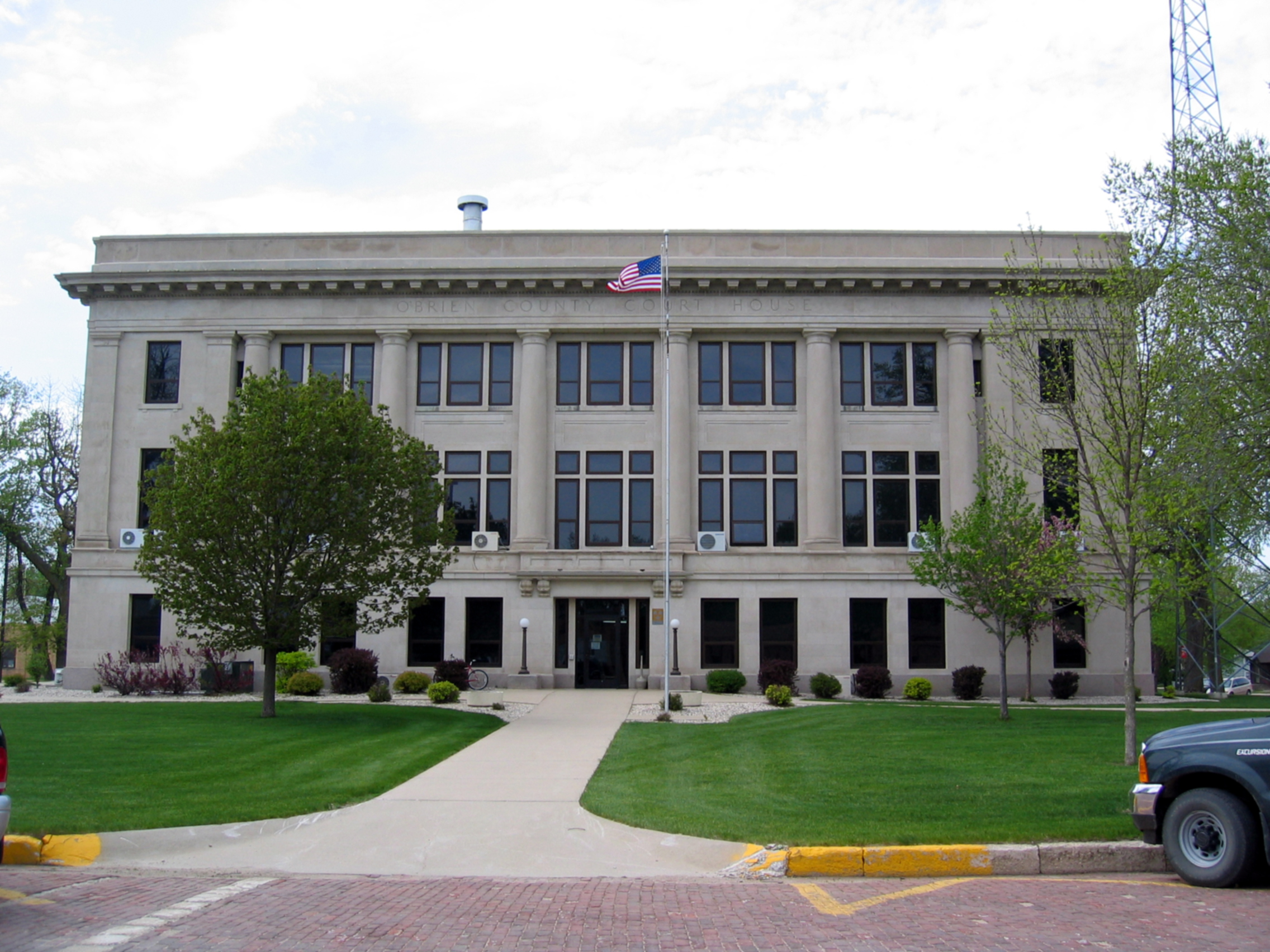
- The O'Brien County Courthouse in Primghar

- Location within the U.S. state of Iowa
- Coordinates: 43°04′53″N 95°37′34″W
- Country: United States
- State: Iowa
- Founded: January 15, 1851
- Named for: William Smith O'Brien
- Seat: Primghar
- Largest city: Sheldon

Area
  - Total: 573 sq mi (1,480 km^{2})
  - Land: 573 sq mi (1,480 km^{2})
  - Water: 0.2 sq mi (0.52 km^{2}) 0.03%

Population (2020)
  - Total: 14,182
  - Estimate (2025): 14,220 ▲
  - Density: 24.8/sq mi (9.56/km^{2})
- Time zone: UTC−6 (Central)
  - Summer (DST): UTC−5 (CDT)
- Congressional district: 4th
- Website: obriencounty.iowa.gov
- Iowa county number 71

O'Brien County is a county in the U.S. state of Iowa. As of the 2020 United States census, the population was 14,182. The county seat is Primghar.

== History ==
By the time Iowa attained statehood (December 28, 1848), its Territorial Legislature had created 44 counties. On January 15, 1851, the new State Legislature created another 49 counties, defining them by lines of survey. O'Brien was among the 49 units thus created. It consists of four survey townships, each formed by 36 square miles arranged in a 6x6 layout, for a nominal 576 square miles total area. The county was named for William Smith O'Brien, a leader for Irish independence in 1848.

The new county's first settler arrived in 1856; Hannibal H. Waterman brought his wife and a daughter to the southeast portion (present Waterman Township). His homestead formed the nucleus of the county's first community, and a small building was erected there to function as a courthouse.

By 1872, the county comprised several small communities, and residents of those groups felt the county's business should be conducted in a more central location. An election was held, the outcome of which was to create a new county seat at its midpoint. A 40-acre (16-hectare) tract at the center of the county was surveyed and platted; its name (Primghar) was created from the initials of eight persons involved with the platting. The previous courthouse building was transported to this new location.

In 1874, a 35-foot square building was erected on the present location at a cost of $2,000, to replace the first structure. It was replaced in 1887 by a larger structure. The County Board of Supervisors authorized its construction, at a cost not to exceed $5,000 (the maximum amount the county was authorized to commit). To keep within this limit, members of the new community agreed to haul the building materials without charge from railroad stops at Sanborn and Paullina. The present courthouse was completed in 1917, and is listed on the National Register of Historic Places.

== Geography ==
According to the United States Census Bureau, the county has a total area of 573 square miles (1,480 km^{2}), of which 573 square miles (1,480 km^{2}) is land and 0.2 square miles (0.52 km^{2}) (0.03%) is water.

=== Major highways ===
- U.S. Highway 18
- U.S. Highway 59
- Iowa Highway 10
- Iowa Highway 60
- Iowa Highway 143

=== Adjacent counties ===
- Osceola County - north
- Clay County - east
- Cherokee County - south
- Sioux County - west

== Demographics ==
Historical population
Census	Pop.	Note	%±
1860	383		—
1870	715		86.7%
1880	4,155		481.1%
1890	13,060		214.3%
1900	16,985		30.1%
1910	17,262		1.6%
1920	19,051		10.4%
1930	18,409		−3.4%
1940	19,293		4.8%
1950	18,970		−1.7%
1960	18,840		−0.7%
1970	17,522		−7.0%
1980	16,972		−3.1%
1990	15,444		−9.0%
2000	15,102		−2.2%
2010	14,398		−4.7%
2020	14,182		−1.5%
2025 (est.)	14,220	▲	0.3%
U.S. Decennial Census; 1790–1960 1900–1990; 1990–2000 2010–2020

=== 2020 census ===
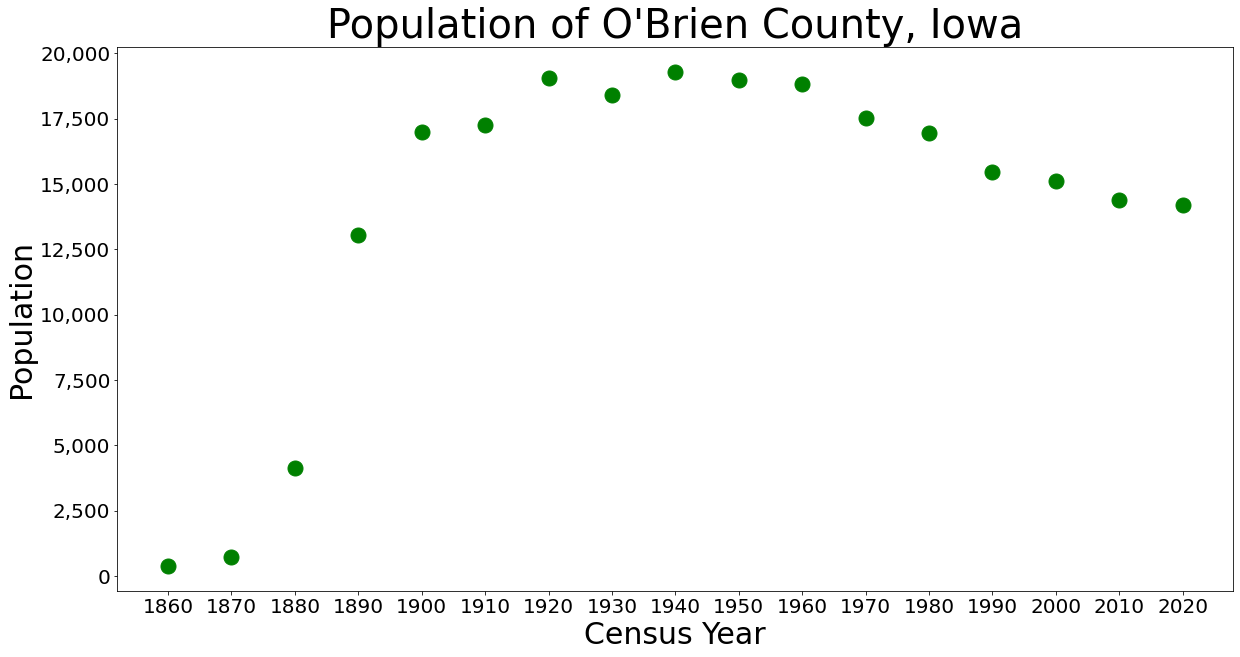
Population of O'Brien County from the U.S. census data

As of the 2020 census, the county had a population of 14,182, yielding a population density of 24.8/sq mi (9.6/km^{2}) and a median age of 42.0 years. 23.3% of residents were under the age of 18 and 22.1% of residents were 65 years of age or older. For every 100 females there were 101.5 males, and for every 100 females age 18 and over there were 99.0 males age 18 and over; 95.42% of residents reported being of one race.

36.2% of residents lived in urban areas, while 63.8% lived in rural areas.

There were 5,861 households in the county, of which 27.2% had children under the age of 18 living in them. Of all households, 52.7% were married-couple households, 19.3% were households with a male householder and no spouse or partner present, and 21.8% were households with a female householder and no spouse or partner present. About 31.8% of all households were made up of individuals and 15.1% had someone living alone who was 65 years of age or older.

There were 6,524 housing units, of which 10.2% were vacant. Among occupied housing units, 73.9% were owner-occupied and 26.1% were renter-occupied. The homeowner vacancy rate was 1.8% and the rental vacancy rate was 12.2%.

The racial makeup of the county was 90.4% White, 1.1% Black or African American, 0.6% American Indian and Alaska Native, 0.6% Asian, 0.1% Native Hawaiian and Pacific Islander, 2.7% from some other race, and 4.6% from two or more races. Hispanic or Latino residents of any race comprised 6.9% of the population.

=== Racial and ethnic composition ===
O'Brien County Racial Composition
Race	Number	Percent
White (NH)	12,609	89%
Black or African American (NH)	159	1.12%
Native American (NH)	39	0.3%
Asian (NH)	79	0.6%
Pacific Islander (NH)	11	0.07%
Other/Mixed (NH)	300	2.12%
Hispanic or Latino	985	7%

=== 2010 census ===
As of the 2010 census, there were 14,398 people, 6,069 households, and 3,927 families in the county. The population density was 25.1/sq mi (9.7/km^{2}). There were 6,649 housing units at an average density of 11 per square mile (4.2/km^{2}). The racial makeup of the county was 96.0% White, 0.5% Black or African American, 0.1% American Indian, 0.6% Asian, 2.0% from other races, and 0.8% from two or more races. The county has a 3.8% Hispanic or Latino background.

There were 6,069 households, out of which 26.0% had children under the age of 18 living with them, 55.1% were married couples living together, 6.1% had a female householder with no husband present, 3.5% had a male householder with no wife present, and 35.3% were non-families. 31.5% of all households were made up of individuals living alone, and 33.1% had someone living alone who was 65 years of age or older. The average household size was 2.31 and the average family size was 2.89.

The county population contained 25.7% under the age of 20, 4.6% from 20 to 24, 21.3% from 25 to 44, 28.1% from 45 to 64, and 20.4% who were 65 years of age or older. The median age was 43.6 years. For every 100 females there were 95.80 males. For every 100 females, there were 99.1 males.

The median income for a household in the county was $44,018, and the median income for a family was $58,127. The per capita income for the county was $24,771. About 6.3% of families and 11.0% of the population were below the poverty line, including 15.7% of those under age 18 and 8.3% of those age 65 or over.

== Communities ==
=== Cities ===
- Archer
- Calumet
- Hartley
- Paullina
- Primghar
- Sanborn
- Sheldon
- Sutherland

=== Unincorporated communities ===
- Gaza
- Germantown
- Moneta
- Plessis
- Ritter

=== Townships ===
- Baker Township
- Caledonia Township
- Carroll Township
- Center Township
- Dale Township
- Floyd Township
- Franklin Township
- Grant Township
- Hartley Township
- Highland Township
- Liberty Township
- Lincoln Township
- Omega Township
- Summit Township
- Union Township
- Waterman Township

=== Population ranking ===
The population ranking of the following table is based on the 2020 census of O'Brien County.

† county seat

Rank	City/Town/etc.	Municipal type	Population (2020 Census)
1	Sheldon (partially in Sioux County)	City	5,251 (5,512 total)
2	Hartley	City	1,605
3	Sanborn	City	1,392
4	Paullina	City	982
5	† Primghar	City	896
6	Sutherland	City	629
7	Calumet	City	146
8	Archer	City	117

== Politics ==
O'Brien County is one of the most consistently Republican counties in Iowa. It has backed the Republican nominee in all but five elections in its history; its inaugural election in 1860, a tie in 1864, backing former Republican turned Progressive Theodore Roosevelt in 1912, and supporting Franklin D. Roosevelt during his two nationwide landslides in 1932 and 1936. Since 1952, the Republican candidate has carried O'Brien County by a margin of at least 20% in every election except for 1964, when Democrat Lyndon B. Johnson only lost the county by 41 votes amidst a nationwide Democratic landslide. In the 21st century, all Republican candidates have obtained over 65% of the county's vote, and beginning in 2012, at least 70% of the vote.

United States presidential election results for O'Brien County, Iowa
Year	Republican		Democratic		Third party(ies)	
Year	No.	%	No.	%	No.	%
1896	2,421	60.10%	1,562	38.78%	45	1.12%
1900	2,386	61.16%	1,461	37.45%	54	1.38%
1904	2,279	68.94%	885	26.77%	142	4.30%
1908	1,912	57.69%	1,326	40.01%	76	2.29%
1912	620	16.02%	1,506	38.91%	1,744	45.06%
1916	2,021	52.53%	1,787	46.45%	39	1.01%
1920	5,137	76.51%	1,468	21.86%	109	1.62%
1924	4,172	58.47%	756	10.60%	2,207	30.93%
1928	4,845	66.39%	2,397	32.84%	56	0.77%
1932	3,213	40.94%	4,503	57.38%	132	1.68%
1936	3,350	38.90%	5,139	59.67%	123	1.43%
1940	4,760	53.30%	4,133	46.28%	38	0.43%
1944	4,033	56.01%	3,138	43.58%	30	0.42%
1948	3,697	50.46%	3,421	46.70%	208	2.84%
1952	7,130	76.18%	2,192	23.42%	38	0.41%
1956	6,138	67.32%	2,970	32.57%	10	0.11%
1960	6,509	68.66%	2,967	31.30%	4	0.04%
1964	4,336	50.20%	4,295	49.73%	6	0.07%
1968	5,594	69.34%	2,146	26.60%	328	4.07%
1972	5,159	68.87%	2,224	29.69%	108	1.44%
1976	4,643	61.86%	2,732	36.40%	131	1.75%
1980	4,937	63.61%	2,210	28.48%	614	7.91%
1984	5,008	66.16%	2,479	32.75%	82	1.08%
1988	4,241	59.97%	2,768	39.14%	63	0.89%
1992	3,869	51.06%	2,122	28.00%	1,587	20.94%
1996	3,877	57.56%	2,236	33.20%	622	9.24%
2000	4,674	66.35%	2,170	30.81%	200	2.84%
2004	5,328	68.92%	2,330	30.14%	73	0.94%
2008	4,894	66.74%	2,338	31.88%	101	1.38%
2012	5,266	71.73%	1,969	26.82%	106	1.44%
2016	5,752	77.67%	1,315	17.76%	339	4.58%
2020	5,861	77.62%	1,569	20.78%	121	1.60%
2024	5,998	79.71%	1,428	18.98%	99	1.32%

== Education ==
School districts include:

- Clay Central-Everly Community School District
- Hartley-Melvin-Sanborn Community School District
- MOC-Floyd Valley Community School District
- Sheldon Community School District
- Sioux Central Community School District
- South O'Brien Community School District

== See also ==
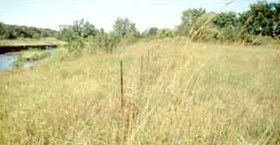
Indian Village Site on the NRHP

- National Register of Historic Places listings in O'Brien County, Iowa
- Indian Village Site in the Witrock Area
