= Germantown, Iowa =

- Unincorporated community
- Location within Iowa
- Coordinates: 42°57′12″N 95°46′51″W
- Country: United States
- State: Iowa
- County: O'Brien
- Elevation: 1,427 ft (435 m)
- Time zone: UTC-6 (Central (CST))
  - Summer (DST): UTC-5 (CDT)
- Area code: 712
- GNIS feature ID: 456886

Germantown is an unincorporated community in O'Brien County, Iowa, United States.

== History ==
Germantown was platted on June 10, 1901. Edward D. Beerman did the platting. Germantown's population was 53 in 1902.

It in the 1910s had a Christian school. The community was home to K-8th grade St. John Lutheran school, before it merged with Zion Lutheran School in Paullina to form Zion - St. John Lutheran School. By 1925, Germantown's population was 55. The population was estimated at 100 in 1940.

South O'Brien Community School District operates schools serving the community. The district was formed on July 1, 1993, by the merger of three school districts: Paullina, Primghar, and Sutherland.
