= Caledonia Township =

Caledonia Township may refer to the following places in the United States:

- Caledonia Township, Boone County, Illinois
- Caledonia Township, O'Brien County, Iowa
- Caledonia Township, Alcona County, Michigan
- Caledonia Township, Kent County, Michigan
- Caledonia Township, Shiawassee County, Michigan
- Caledonia Township, Houston County, Minnesota

== See also ==
- Caledonia Township, Ontario, now part of the Canadian municipality of The Nation, Ontario
