= Ritter, Iowa =

- Unincorporated community
- Location within Iowa
- Coordinates: 43°14′39″N 95°49′22″W
- Country: United States
- State: Iowa
- County: O'Brien
- Elevation: 1,427 ft (435 m)
- Time zone: UTC-6 (Central (CST))
  - Summer (DST): UTC-5 (CDT)
- Area code: 712
- GNIS feature ID: 464720

Ritter is an unincorporated community in O'Brien County, Iowa, United States.

== History ==
Ritter was platted when the Chicago, Minneapolis & St. Paul Railroad was extended to that point. The community was named for J. L. Ritter, a railroad dispatcher. The population was 16 in 1940.
