= 1936 United States presidential election in Iowa =

- November 3, 1936

All 11 Iowa votes to the Electoral College

Nominee	Franklin D. Roosevelt	Alf Landon
Party	Democratic	Republican
Home state	New York	Kansas
Running mate	John Nance Garner	Frank Knox
Electoral vote	11	0
Popular vote	621,756	487,977
Percentage	54.41%	42.70%
County results
Roosevelt
40–50%
50–60%
60–70%
Landon
40–50%
50–60%
President before election
Franklin D. Roosevelt
Democratic
Elected President
Franklin D. Roosevelt
Democratic

The 1936 United States presidential election in Iowa took place on November 3, 1936, as part of the 1936 United States presidential election. Iowa voters chose 11 representatives, or electors, to the Electoral College, who voted for president and vice president.

Iowa was won by incumbent President Franklin D. Roosevelt (D–New York), running with Vice President John Nance Garner, with 54.41% of the popular vote, against Governor Alf Landon (R–Kansas), running with Frank Knox, with 42.70% of the popular vote. As of the 2024 presidential election, this is the last occasion when Sioux County, Lyon County and O'Brien County have voted for a Democratic presidential candidate.

== Results ==
1936 United States presidential election in Iowa
Party	Candidate	Votes	%
Democratic	Franklin D. Roosevelt (inc.)	621,756	54.41%
Republican	Alf Landon	487,977	42.70%
Union	William Lemke	29,687	2.60%
Socialist	Norman Thomas	1,373	0.12%
Prohibition	D. Leigh Colvin	1,182	0.10%
Communist	Earl R. Browder	506	0.04%
Socialist Labor	John W. Aiken	252	0.02%
Total votes		1,142,733	100%

=== Results by county ===
County	Franklin Delano Roosevelt Democratic		Alfred Mossmann Landon Republican		William Frederick Lemke Union		Various candidates Other parties		Margin		Total votes cast
County	#	%	#	%	#	%	#	%	#	%	Total votes cast
Adair	3,243	47.95%	3,436	50.81%	77	1.14%	7	0.10%	-193	-2.85%	6,763
Adams	2,249	42.69%	2,953	56.06%	61	1.16%	5	0.09%	-704	-13.36%	5,268
Allamakee	4,327	49.38%	4,053	46.25%	370	4.22%	13	0.15%	274	3.13%	8,763
Appanoose	6,599	54.08%	5,511	45.16%	39	0.32%	54	0.44%	1,088	8.92%	12,203
Audubon	3,448	59.05%	2,344	40.14%	42	0.72%	5	0.09%	1,104	18.91%	5,839
Benton	5,606	56.43%	4,144	41.72%	145	1.46%	39	0.39%	1,462	14.72%	9,934
Black Hawk	16,793	53.01%	13,666	43.14%	1,133	3.58%	89	0.28%	3,127	9.87%	31,681
Boone	7,080	60.88%	4,110	35.34%	354	3.04%	85	0.73%	2,970	25.54%	11,629
Bremer	5,058	59.72%	3,220	38.02%	178	2.10%	14	0.17%	1,838	21.70%	8,470
Buchanan	5,025	50.79%	4,734	47.85%	127	1.28%	8	0.08%	291	2.94%	9,894
Buena Vista	5,287	60.18%	3,334	37.95%	129	1.47%	35	0.40%	1,953	22.23%	8,785
Butler	3,786	50.14%	3,604	47.73%	149	1.97%	12	0.16%	182	2.41%	7,551
Calhoun	4,544	59.02%	3,027	39.32%	93	1.21%	35	0.45%	1,517	19.70%	7,699
Carroll	6,285	59.84%	3,259	31.03%	948	9.03%	11	0.10%	3,026	28.81%	10,503
Cass	4,284	43.00%	5,622	56.43%	44	0.44%	12	0.12%	-1,338	-13.43%	9,962
Cedar	4,385	53.25%	3,686	44.76%	153	1.86%	11	0.13%	699	8.49%	8,235
Cerro Gordo	9,694	54.48%	7,599	42.71%	470	2.64%	31	0.17%	2,095	11.77%	17,794
Cherokee	4,716	60.11%	2,902	36.99%	213	2.72%	14	0.18%	1,814	23.12%	7,845
Chickasaw	4,458	56.67%	3,143	39.96%	242	3.08%	23	0.29%	1,315	16.72%	7,866
Clarke	2,613	49.65%	2,571	48.85%	52	0.99%	27	0.51%	42	0.80%	5,263
Clay	4,691	61.84%	2,774	36.57%	104	1.37%	17	0.22%	1,917	25.27%	7,586
Clayton	6,731	55.01%	5,017	41.00%	475	3.88%	13	0.11%	1,714	14.01%	12,236
Clinton	12,269	53.25%	10,016	43.47%	729	3.16%	28	0.12%	2,253	9.78%	23,042
Crawford	5,720	60.20%	3,514	36.98%	231	2.43%	37	0.39%	2,206	23.22%	9,502
Dallas	6,341	52.96%	5,442	45.45%	159	1.33%	31	0.26%	899	7.51%	11,973
Davis	3,463	54.86%	2,815	44.59%	26	0.41%	9	0.14%	648	10.26%	6,313
Decatur	4,131	55.12%	3,327	44.40%	26	0.35%	10	0.13%	804	10.73%	7,494
Delaware	4,350	48.09%	4,483	49.56%	195	2.16%	18	0.20%	-133	-1.47%	9,046
Des Moines	7,011	44.64%	6,763	43.06%	1,808	11.51%	123	0.78%	248	1.58%	15,705
Dickinson	3,399	58.69%	2,322	40.10%	54	0.93%	16	0.28%	1,077	18.60%	5,791
Dubuque	16,291	59.50%	8,275	30.22%	2,739	10.00%	73	0.27%	8,016	29.28%	27,378
Emmet	3,158	55.94%	2,362	41.84%	111	1.97%	14	0.25%	796	14.10%	5,645
Fayette	7,210	53.82%	5,891	43.97%	260	1.94%	36	0.27%	1,319	9.85%	13,397
Floyd	4,242	46.97%	4,267	47.25%	489	5.41%	33	0.37%	-25	-0.28%	9,031
Franklin	3,993	59.55%	2,530	37.73%	159	2.37%	23	0.34%	1,463	21.82%	6,705
Fremont	4,301	56.47%	3,291	43.21%	13	0.17%	12	0.16%	1,010	13.26%	7,617
Greene	3,961	52.40%	3,384	44.77%	199	2.63%	15	0.20%	577	7.63%	7,559
Grundy	3,918	58.45%	2,656	39.62%	123	1.83%	6	0.09%	1,262	18.83%	6,703
Guthrie	3,619	44.30%	4,155	50.86%	377	4.61%	19	0.23%	-536	-6.56%	8,170
Hamilton	5,432	62.02%	3,174	36.24%	119	1.36%	33	0.38%	2,258	25.78%	8,758
Hancock	3,930	59.28%	2,585	39.00%	103	1.55%	11	0.17%	1,345	20.29%	6,629
Hardin	5,429	54.66%	4,306	43.35%	154	1.55%	44	0.44%	1,123	11.31%	9,933
Harrison	6,206	53.14%	5,314	45.50%	151	1.29%	7	0.06%	892	7.64%	11,678
Henry	3,542	42.82%	4,480	54.17%	223	2.70%	26	0.31%	-938	-11.34%	8,271
Howard	3,861	54.40%	2,947	41.52%	275	3.87%	15	0.21%	914	12.88%	7,098
Humboldt	3,420	59.00%	2,262	39.02%	98	1.69%	17	0.29%	1,158	19.98%	5,797
Ida	3,397	63.70%	1,834	34.39%	77	1.44%	25	0.47%	1,563	29.31%	5,333
Iowa	4,163	53.98%	3,360	43.57%	159	2.06%	30	0.39%	803	10.41%	7,712
Jackson	4,889	55.41%	3,581	40.59%	335	3.80%	18	0.20%	1,308	14.82%	8,823
Jasper	8,315	57.76%	5,875	40.81%	166	1.15%	39	0.27%	2,440	16.95%	14,395
Jefferson	3,690	46.47%	4,037	50.84%	189	2.38%	25	0.31%	-347	-4.37%	7,941
Johnson	8,794	59.65%	5,629	38.18%	262	1.78%	58	0.39%	3,165	21.47%	14,743
Jones	5,052	54.00%	4,141	44.26%	156	1.67%	7	0.07%	911	9.74%	9,356
Keokuk	5,162	52.26%	4,491	45.46%	203	2.06%	22	0.22%	671	6.79%	9,878
Kossuth	8,071	68.04%	3,569	30.09%	209	1.76%	14	0.12%	4,502	37.95%	11,863
Lee	9,630	49.85%	8,955	46.36%	687	3.56%	45	0.23%	675	3.49%	19,317
Linn	19,724	49.55%	19,129	48.06%	867	2.18%	86	0.22%	595	1.49%	39,806
Louisa	2,859	50.92%	2,655	47.28%	93	1.66%	8	0.14%	204	3.63%	5,615
Lucas	3,773	51.11%	3,414	46.25%	158	2.14%	37	0.50%	359	4.86%	7,382
Lyon	3,590	60.40%	2,264	38.09%	83	1.40%	7	0.12%	1,326	22.31%	5,944
Madison	3,365	44.22%	4,188	55.04%	45	0.59%	11	0.14%	-823	-10.82%	7,609
Mahaska	6,094	51.97%	5,270	44.94%	289	2.46%	73	0.62%	824	7.03%	11,726
Marion	6,745	56.27%	4,975	41.51%	243	2.03%	23	0.19%	1,770	14.77%	11,986
Marshall	6,297	44.95%	7,377	52.66%	283	2.02%	51	0.36%	-1,080	-7.71%	14,008
Mills	3,610	51.02%	3,424	48.40%	30	0.42%	11	0.16%	186	2.63%	7,075
Mitchell	3,610	54.67%	2,765	41.87%	215	3.26%	13	0.20%	845	12.80%	6,603
Monona	5,346	62.89%	3,008	35.39%	134	1.58%	12	0.14%	2,338	27.51%	8,500
Monroe	4,205	56.36%	3,001	40.22%	213	2.85%	42	0.56%	1,204	16.14%	7,461
Montgomery	3,920	46.77%	4,395	52.43%	48	0.57%	19	0.23%	-475	-5.67%	8,382
Muscatine	6,593	49.52%	6,332	47.56%	328	2.46%	60	0.45%	261	1.96%	13,313
O'Brien	5,139	59.67%	3,350	38.90%	112	1.30%	11	0.13%	1,789	20.77%	8,612
Osceola	2,812	63.15%	1,539	34.56%	90	2.02%	12	0.27%	1,273	28.59%	4,453
Page	4,646	41.03%	6,624	58.50%	22	0.19%	31	0.27%	-1,978	-17.47%	11,323
Palo Alto	4,515	61.57%	2,613	35.63%	189	2.58%	16	0.22%	1,902	25.94%	7,333
Plymouth	5,994	52.37%	4,133	36.11%	1,297	11.33%	21	0.18%	1,861	16.26%	11,445
Pocahontas	4,357	63.89%	2,277	33.39%	171	2.51%	14	0.21%	2,080	30.50%	6,819
Polk	44,274	55.72%	33,819	42.56%	1,010	1.27%	357	0.45%	10,455	13.16%	79,460
Pottawattamie	16,259	56.23%	12,223	42.28%	371	1.28%	60	0.21%	4,036	13.96%	28,913
Poweshiek	4,745	52.75%	4,037	44.88%	178	1.98%	36	0.40%	708	7.87%	8,996
Ringgold	2,615	43.62%	3,316	55.31%	51	0.85%	13	0.22%	-701	-11.69%	5,995
Sac	4,472	55.74%	3,437	42.84%	102	1.27%	12	0.15%	1,035	12.90%	8,023
Scott	20,737	60.73%	12,691	37.17%	616	1.80%	101	0.30%	8,046	23.56%	34,145
Shelby	4,264	51.80%	3,490	42.40%	469	5.70%	8	0.10%	774	9.40%	8,231
Sioux	5,553	52.05%	4,543	42.58%	564	5.29%	9	0.08%	1,010	9.47%	10,669
Story	6,933	51.02%	6,358	46.79%	186	1.37%	111	0.82%	575	4.23%	13,588
Tama	6,625	57.50%	4,737	41.11%	141	1.22%	19	0.16%	1,888	16.39%	11,522
Taylor	3,337	44.23%	4,145	54.94%	44	0.58%	19	0.25%	-808	-10.71%	7,545
Union	3,938	45.27%	4,647	53.42%	100	1.15%	14	0.16%	-709	-8.15%	8,699
Van Buren	2,804	43.66%	3,535	55.05%	55	0.86%	28	0.44%	-731	-11.38%	6,422
Wapello	10,578	57.14%	7,647	41.31%	217	1.17%	70	0.38%	2,931	15.83%	18,512
Warren	4,011	45.55%	4,642	52.72%	109	1.24%	43	0.49%	-631	-7.17%	8,805
Washington	4,379	48.03%	4,619	50.66%	103	1.13%	17	0.19%	-240	-2.63%	9,118
Wayne	3,778	50.70%	3,609	48.43%	39	0.52%	26	0.35%	169	2.27%	7,452
Webster	9,885	57.56%	6,494	37.81%	738	4.30%	57	0.33%	3,391	19.74%	17,174
Winnebago	3,133	52.86%	2,592	43.73%	182	3.07%	20	0.34%	541	9.13%	5,927
Winneshiek	5,980	53.48%	4,489	40.15%	682	6.10%	30	0.27%	1,491	13.34%	11,181
Woodbury	26,847	62.43%	14,157	32.92%	1,814	4.22%	184	0.43%	12,690	29.51%	43,002
Worth	2,976	59.71%	1,964	39.41%	37	0.74%	7	0.14%	1,012	20.30%	4,984
Wright	5,177	59.44%	3,311	38.01%	207	2.38%	15	0.17%	1,866	21.42%	8,710
Totals	621,756	54.41%	487,977	42.70%	29,687	2.60%	3,293	0.29%	133,779	11.71%	1,142,713

==== Counties that flipped from Democratic to Republican ====
- Adair
- Adams
- Cass
- Delaware
- Floyd
- Guthrie
- Henry
- Jefferson
- Madison
- Montgomery
- Page
- Ringgold
- Taylor
- Union
- Van Buren
- Washington

==== Counties that flipped from Republican to Democratic ====
- Black Hawk
- Linn
- Polk
- Story

== See also ==
- United States presidential elections in Iowa
