= Omega Township, O'Brien County, Iowa =

Township in O'Brien County, Iowa, U.S.

Coordinates: 43.127°N 95.447°W

Omega Township is a township in O'Brien County, Iowa, United States.

== History ==
Omega Township was founded in 1881, and named after the letter of the Greek alphabet.
