= Plessis, Iowa =

- Unincorporated community
- Location within Iowa
- Coordinates: 43°14′01″N 95°32′53″W
- Country: United States
- State: Iowa
- County: O'Brien
- Elevation: 1,519 ft (463 m)
- Time zone: UTC-6 (Central (CST))
  - Summer (DST): UTC-5 (CDT)
- Area code: 712
- GNIS feature ID: 464705

Plessis is an unincorporated community in Lincoln Township, O'Brien County, Iowa, United States. Plessis is located along Tanager Avenue, 5.1 miles (8.2 km) northwest of Hartley.

The population of Plessis was 4 in 1940.
