= Floyd Township, O'Brien County, Iowa =

Township in O'Brien County, Iowa, U.S.

Coordinates: 43.21°N 95.80°W

Floyd Township is a township in O'Brien County, Iowa, United States.

== History ==
Floyd Township was established in 1872. It was named for the explorer Charles Floyd.
