= Matlock, Iowa =

- City
- Location of Matlock, Iowa
- Coordinates: 43°14′40″N 95°56′04″W
- Country: US
- State: Iowa
- County: Sioux

Area
  - Total: 0.38 sq mi (0.98 km^{2})
  - Land: 0.38 sq mi (0.98 km^{2})
  - Water: 0 sq mi (0.00 km^{2})
- Elevation: 1,404 ft (428 m)

Population (2020)
  - Total: 74
  - Density: 195.7/sq mi (75.55/km^{2})
- Time zone: UTC-6 (Central (CST))
  - Summer (DST): UTC-5 (CDT)
- ZIP code: 51244
- Area code: 712
- FIPS code: 19-50385
- GNIS feature ID: 2395044

Matlock is a city in Sioux County, Iowa, United States. The population was 74 at the time of the 2020 census.

== Geography ==
According to the United States Census Bureau, the city has a total area of 0.37 square miles (0.96 km^{2}), all land.

== Demographics ==
Historical populations
Year	Pop.	±%
1900	94	—
1910	118	+25.5%
1920	94	−20.3%
1930	103	+9.6%
1940	112	+8.7%
1950	104	−7.1%
1960	103	−1.0%
1970	89	−13.6%
1980	109	+22.5%
1990	92	−15.6%
2000	83	−9.8%
2010	87	+4.8%
2020	74	−14.9%
Source:"U.S. Census website". United States Census Bureau. and Iowa Data Center; Source: U.S. Decennial Census

=== 2020 census ===
As of the census of 2020, there were 74 people, 33 households, and 26 families residing in the city. The population density was 195.7 inhabitants per square mile (75.5/km^{2}). There were 33 housing units at an average density of 87.3 per square mile (33.7/km^{2}). The racial makeup of the city was 98.6% White, 0.0% Black or African American, 0.0% Native American, 0.0% Asian, 0.0% Pacific Islander, 0.0% from other races and 1.4% from two or more races. Hispanic or Latino persons of any race comprised 0.0% of the population.

Of the 33 households, 27.3% of which had children under the age of 18 living with them, 57.6% were married couples living together, 6.1% were cohabitating couples, 24.2% had a female householder with no spouse or partner present and 12.1% had a male householder with no spouse or partner present. 21.2% of all households were non-families. 18.2% of all households were made up of individuals, 9.1% had someone living alone who was 65 years old or older.

The median age in the city was 49.5 years. 18.9% of the residents were under the age of 20; 10.8% were between the ages of 20 and 24; 14.9% were from 25 and 44; 39.2% were from 45 and 64; and 16.2% were 65 years of age or older. The gender makeup of the city was 44.6% male and 55.4% female.

=== 2010 census ===
As of the census of 2010, there were 87 people, 34 households, and 24 families living in the city. The population density was 235.1 inhabitants per square mile (90.8/km^{2}). There were 35 housing units at an average density of 94.6 per square mile (36.5/km^{2}). The racial makeup of the city was 100.0% White.

There were 34 households, of which 29.4% had children under the age of 18 living with them, 64.7% were married couples living together, 2.9% had a female householder with no husband present, 2.9% had a male householder with no wife present, and 29.4% were non-families. 17.6% of all households were made up of individuals, and 8.8% had someone living alone who was 65 years of age or older. The average household size was 2.56 and the average family size was 2.96.

The median age in the city was 44.2 years. 25.3% of residents were under the age of 18; 6.8% were between the ages of 18 and 24; 20.7% were from 25 to 44; 29.8% were from 45 to 64; and 17.2% were 65 years of age or older. The gender makeup of the city was 55.2% male and 44.8% female.

=== 2000 census ===
As of the census of 2000, there were 83 people, 33 households, and 26 families living in the city. The population density was 219.6 inhabitants per square mile (84.8/km^{2}). There were 35 housing units at an average density of 92.6 per square mile (35.8/km^{2}). The racial makeup of the city was 97.59% White and 2.41% Native American.

There were 33 households, out of which 36.4% had children under the age of 18 living with them, 78.8% were married couples living together, and 21.2% were non-families. 18.2% of all households were made up of individuals, and 3.0% had someone living alone who was 65 years of age or older. The average household size was 2.52 and the average family size was 2.88.

In the city, the population was spread out, with 25.3% under the age of 18, 7.2% from 18 to 24, 38.6% from 25 to 44, 18.1% from 45 to 64, and 10.8% who were 65 years of age or older. The median age was 37 years. For every 100 females, there were 107.5 males. For every 100 females age 18 and over, there were 121.4 males.

The median income for a household in the city was $36,750, and the median income for a family was $41,875. Males had a median income of $23,750 versus $16,875 for females. The per capita income for the city was $17,448. There were 4.0% of families and 11.1% of the population living below the poverty line, including 17.4% of under eighteens and none of those over 64.

== Education ==
Matlock is served by the Sheldon Community School District.
