= Summit Township, O'Brien County, Iowa =

Township in O'Brien County, Iowa, U.S.

Coordinates: 43.128°N 95.683°W

Summit Township is a township in O'Brien County, Iowa, United States.

== History ==
Summit Township was founded in 1873.
