= Moneta, Iowa =

- Unincorporated community
- Location within Iowa
- Coordinates: 43°07′45″N 95°23′26″W
- Country: United States
- State: Iowa
- County: O'Brien
- Elevation: 1,447 ft (441 m)
- Time zone: UTC-6 (Central (CST))
  - Summer (DST): UTC-5 (CDT)
- Area code: 712
- GNIS feature ID: 459169

Moneta is an unincorporated community and former city in O'Brien County, Iowa, United States.

== History ==
Historical population
Census	Pop.	Note	%±
1910	44		—
1920	127		188.6%
1930	85		−33.1%
1940	115		35.3%
1950	89		−22.6%
1960	76		−14.6%
1970	41		−46.1%
1980	43		4.9%
1990	29		−32.6%
U.S. Decennial Census

Moneta was platted in 1901. The name Moneta is supposed to be a poetic form for the island of Anglesey.

Moneta's population was 87 in 1915. The population was 85 in 1940. The community was originally an incorporated city, and it also had a school, but however, by 1959, the school closed and divided between Hartley and Everly, giving 60% of the school towards Everly, and the other 40% to Hartley. Eventually, the school would completely close down in 1976, and the city would later disincorporate by 1996; The final recorded population of Moneta was 29 at the 1990 census. Not much is left of the former city, as the school is one of the only remaining remnants.

== See also ==
- List of Discontinued cities in Iowa
