= Dale Township, O'Brien County, Iowa =

Township in O'Brien County, Iowa, U.S.

Coordinates: 43.041°N 95.683°W

Dale Township is a township in O'Brien County, Iowa, United States.

== History ==
Dale Township was founded in 1880.
