= Northwest Iowa Community College =

Public college in Sheldon, Iowa, US

Coordinates: 43.183°N 95.879°W

Northwest Iowa Community College (NCC) is a public community college in Sheldon, Iowa. It opened in 1966 and is accredited by the North Central Association of Colleges and Schools. The college is located on a 269-acre campus one mile west of Sheldon. Northwest Iowa Community College offers both vocational technical programs and arts and sciences transfer courses—43 programs in all.

2013 enrollment in credit programs was 1,628. Additionally, NCC's noncredit enrollment annually exceeds 28,000 in career supplemental, preparatory continuing, and high school completion, which includes both GED and high school diploma.
