= Sheldon Community School District =

Public school district in Sheldon, Iowa, United States

Coordinates: 43.184096°N 95.834965°W

Location
- Sheldon, Iowa O'Brien, Sioux, Osceola, and Lyon counties United States
- Coordinates: 43.184096, -95.834965

District information
- Type: Local school district
- Grades: K-12
- Superintendent: Cory Meyer
- Schools: 3
- Budget: $17,291,000 (2020-21)
- NCES District ID: 1925980

Students and staff
- Students: 1196 (2022-23)
- Teachers: 84.79 FTE
- Staff: 87.21 FTE
- Student–teacher ratio: 14.11
- Athletic conference: Siouxland
- District mascot: Orabs
- Colors: Orange and Black

Other information
- Website: www.sheldonschools.com

Sheldon Community School District is a rural public school district headquartered in Sheldon, Iowa.

The district is mostly in O'Brien County with smaller portions in Sioux, Osceola, and Lyon counties. It serves Sheldon, Archer, Ashton, and Matlock, as well as the surrounding rural areas.

Cory Myer has been superintendent since 2018.

Nick Miller has been principal of Sheldon High School since February 8, 2023.

== List of Schools ==
The district operates three schools, all located in Sheldon:

- East Elementary School
- Sheldon Middle School
- Sheldon High School

== See also ==
- List of school districts in Iowa
