= Gaza, Iowa =

- Unincorporated community
- Location within Iowa
- Coordinates: 43°01′13″N 95°34′48″W
- Country: United States
- State: Iowa
- County: O'Brien
- Elevation: 1,496 ft (456 m)
- Time zone: UTC-6 (Central (CST))
  - Summer (DST): UTC-5 (CDT)
- Area code: 712
- GNIS feature ID: 456864

Gaza is an unincorporated community in O'Brien County, Iowa, United States.

== History ==
Gaza got its start in the year 1888, following construction of the Illinois Central Railroad through that territory. It was named after Gaza, a biblical city where Samson is purported to have died. Gaza's population was 42 in 1902. The population was estimated at 100 in 1940.

== Education ==
South O'Brien Community School District operates schools serving the community. The district was formed on July 1, 1993, by the merger of three school districts: Paullina, Primghar, and Sutherland.
