= Calumet, Iowa =

- City
- Location of Calumet, Iowa
- Coordinates: 42°56′42″N 95°33′05″W
- Country: USA
- State: Iowa
- County: O'Brien

Area
  - Total: 0.27 sq mi (0.69 km^{2})
  - Land: 0.27 sq mi (0.69 km^{2})
  - Water: 0 sq mi (0.00 km^{2})
- Elevation: 1,440 ft (440 m)

Population (2020)
  - Total: 146
  - Density: 548.2/sq mi (211.65/km^{2})
- Time zone: UTC-6 (Central (CST))
  - Summer (DST): UTC-5 (CDT)
- ZIP code: 51009
- Area code: 712
- FIPS code: 19-10090
- GNIS feature ID: 2393501

Calumet is a city in O'Brien County, Iowa, United States. The population was 146 at the 2020 census.

== History ==
Establishment of the community followed the laying of a rail line and construction of a depot in 1887 by the Illinois Central Railroad. Calumet was platted in that year, and the formation of a post office and construction of a town hall and commercial businesses quickly followed — all capitalizing on the availability of rail service to and from the region. The siting of the railroad, however, proved to supplant another small town, Erie, which had been located a half-mile west and one and a half miles south of the Calumet depot.

Following its early commercial and residential growth, the town of Calumet was incorporated in 1895. In May 1897, a fire destroyed a substantial portion of the downtown business area, but the town quickly recovered from this loss. By 1914, the population was reported to be approximately 300, and Calumet was home to some two dozen retail businesses, a bank, a school that served the surrounding Liberty Township, two churches, a newspaper, and a hospital.

Early settlers of Calumet and its environs were overwhelmingly German immigrants, primarily from the far-north Schleswig-Holstein region, adjacent to Denmark. In the 1900 U.S. census for Liberty Township, O'Brien County, Iowa, well over two-thirds of residents reported German heritage, based on the location of their own birth or that of their parents. This strong cultural identity flavored the early civic and religious life of the town and township. For example, the German Evangelical Lutheran Church was established in 1891, and its successor church continued to offer worship services in Low German (Plattdeutsch, the language of Schleswig-Holstein) in addition to English until the mid-20th century. A 22-member Calumet German Band was established in 1908 and remained active until 1913; of its members, 20 reflected a Schleswig-Holstein heritage.

== Geography ==
According to the United States Census Bureau, the town of Calumet has a total area of 0.27 square miles (0.70 km^{2}), all land.

== Demographics ==
Historical population
Census	Pop.	Note	%±
1900	113		—
1910	243		115.0%
1920	266		9.5%
1930	249		−6.4%
1940	274		10.0%
1950	250		−8.8%
1960	225		−10.0%
1970	219		−2.7%
1980	212		−3.2%
1990	160		−24.5%
2000	181		13.1%
2010	170		−6.1%
2020	146		−14.1%
U.S. Decennial Census

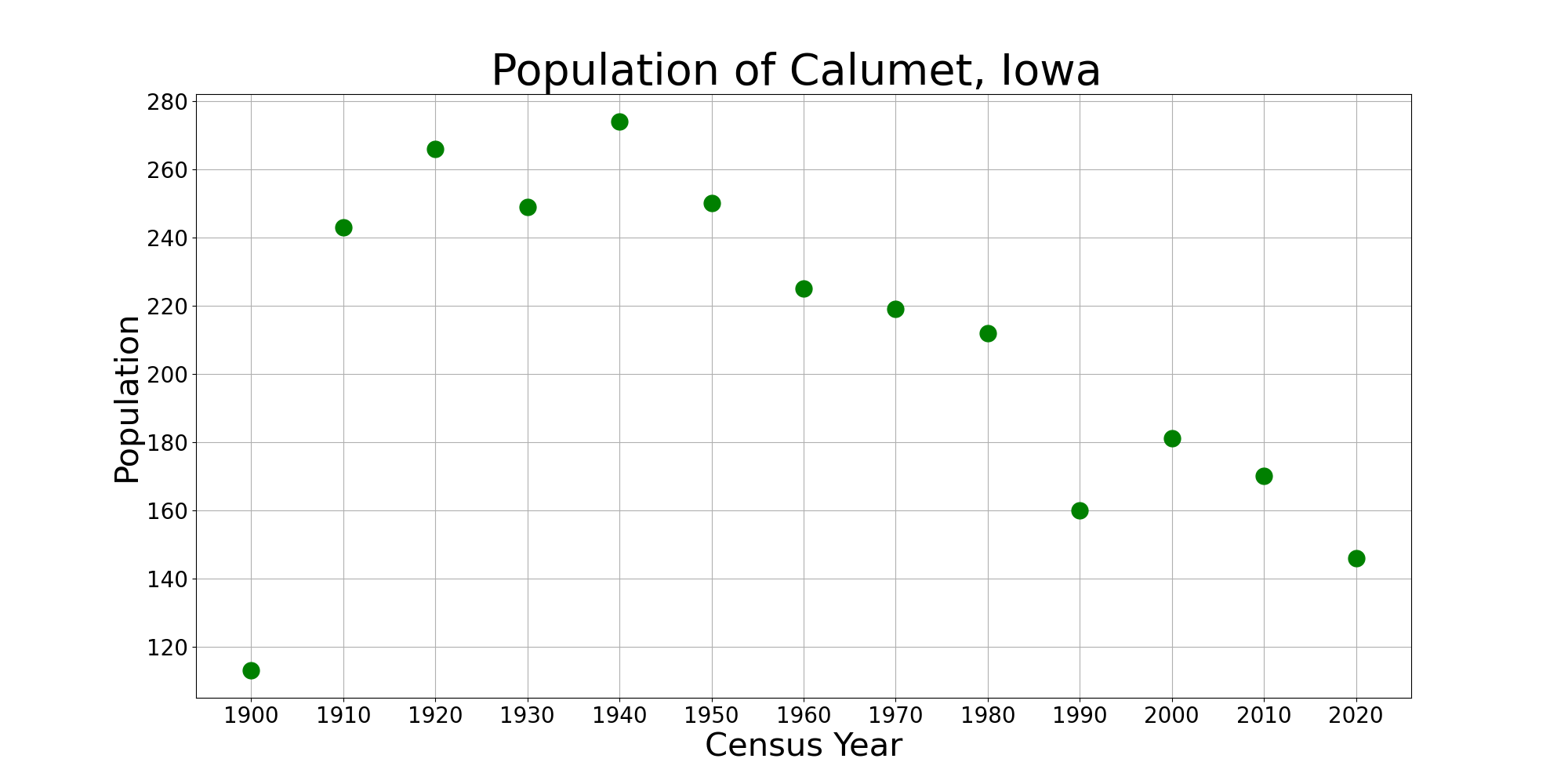
The population of Calumet, Iowa from US census data

=== 2020 census ===
As of the census of 2020, there were 146 people, 73 households, and 45 families residing in the community. The population density was 548.2 inhabitants per square mile (211.6/km^{2}). There were 73 housing units at an average density of 274.1 per square mile (105.8/km^{2}). The racial makeup of Calumet was 93.8% White, 2.1% Black or African American, 0.0% Native American, 0.0% Asian, 0.0% Pacific Islander, 0.7% from other races, and 3.4% from two or more races. Hispanic or Latino persons of any race comprised 2.1% of the population.

Of the 73 households, 30.1% of which had children under the age of 18 living with them, 38.4% were married couples living together, 6.8% were cohabitating couples, 24.7% had a female householder with no spouse or partner present, and 30.1% had a male householder with no spouse or partner present. 38.4% of all households were non-families. 31.5% of all households were made up of individuals, and 17.8% had someone living alone who was 65 years old or older.

The median age in the municipality was 40.5 years. 28.8% of the residents were under the age of 20, 2.7% were between the ages of 20 and 24, 26.7% were from 25 to 44, 22.6% were from 45 to 64, and 19.2% were 65 years of age or older. The gender makeup of the town was 55.5% male and 44.5% female.

=== 2010 census ===
As of the census of 2010, there were 170 people, 75 households, and 50 families living in Calumet. The population density was 629.6 inhabitants per square mile (243.1/km^{2}). There were 86 housing units at an average density of 318.5 per square mile (123.0/km^{2}). The racial makeup of the community was 96.5% White and 3.5% African American. Those who were Hispanic or Latino of any race comprised 4.7% of the population.

There were 75 households, of which 26.7% had children under the age of 18 living with them, 54.7% were married couples living together, 5.3% had a female householder with no husband present, 6.7% had a male householder with no wife present, and 33.3% were non-families. 29.3% of all households were made up of individuals, and 12% had someone living alone who was 65 years of age or older. The average household size was 2.27, and the average family size was 2.74.

The median age in the community was 41.5 years. 21.2% of residents were under the age of 18, 8.8% were between the ages of 18 and 24, 23% were from 25 to 44, 31.1% were from 45 to 64, and 15.9% were 65 years of age or older. The gender makeup was 52.4% male and 47.6% female.

=== 2000 census ===
As of the census of 2000, there were 181 people, 77 households, and 51 families living in Calumet. The population density was 684.5 inhabitants per square mile (264.3/km^{2}). There were 83 housing units at an average density of 313.9 per square mile (121.2/km^{2}). The racial makeup was 96.69% White, 0.55% African American, 0.55% Asian, and 2.21% from two or more races.

There were 77 households, out of which 26.0% had children under the age of 18 living with them, 61.0% were married couples living together, 3.9% had a female householder with no husband present, and 32.5% were non-families. 31.2% of all households were made up of individuals, and 18.2% had someone living alone who was 65 years of age or older. The average household size was 2.35, and the average family size was 2.94.

Within the community, the population was spread out, with 25.4% under the age of 18, 5.5% from 18 to 24, 26.0% from 25 to 44, 23.2% from 45 to 64, and 19.9% who were 65 years of age or older. The median age was 39 years. For every 100 females, there were 101.1 males. For every 100 females age 18 and over, there were 101.5 males.

The median income for a household in Calumet was $33,750, and the median income for a family was $39,375. Males had a median income of $33,125 versus $16,250 for females. The per capita income was $17,659. About 2.0% of families and 8.5% of the population were below the poverty line, including 6.4% of those under the age of 18 and 25.0% of those 65 or over.

== Education ==
The Calumet school, which had been organized in 1900, operated until 1961, when it was consolidated with the Sutherland school district to the northeast of Calumet. Today, Calumet is served by the South O'Brien Community School District. The district was formed on July 1, 1993 by the merger of three school districts: Paullina, Primghar, and Sutherland.
