= Baker Township, O'Brien County, Iowa =

Township in O'Brien County, Iowa

Coordinates: 43.0406°N 95.8008°W

Baker Township is a township in O'Brien County, Iowa, United States.

== History ==
Baker Township was founded in the 1870s. The township was named for General N. B. Baker, who played an active role in creating it.
