= Archer, Iowa =

- City
- Location of Archer, Iowa

- Location within Iowa Location within the United States Location within North America
- Coordinates: 43°06′54″N 95°44′39″W
- Country: USA
- State: Iowa
- County: O'Brien

Area
  - Total: 0.085 sq mi (0.22 km^{2})
  - Land: 0.085 sq mi (0.22 km^{2})
  - Water: 0 sq mi (0.00 km^{2})
- Elevation: 1,470 ft (450 m)

Population (2020)
  - Total: 117
  - Density: 1,370/sq mi (528.9/km^{2})
- Time zone: UTC-6 (Central (CST))
  - Summer (DST): UTC-5 (CDT)
- ZIP code: 51231
- Area code: 712
- FIPS code: 19-02530
- GNIS feature ID: 2393975

Archer is a city in O'Brien County, Iowa, United States. The population was 117 at the 2020 census.

== History ==
Archer was founded in 1888. It was named for John Archer, who owned the town site.

Longstanding Mayor Bill Engeltjes oversaw the centennial celebration of 1988. Replete with a parade, fashion show, street dance, and "greased pig" contest, the celebration honored Northwest Iowan heritage.

The town of Archer supports two churches: one Methodist and one Reformed.

== Geography ==
According to the United States Census Bureau, the city has a total area of 0.09 square miles (0.23 km^{2}), all land.

== Demographics ==
Historical population
Census	Pop.	Note	%±
1910	351		—
1920	184		−47.6%
1930	150		−18.5%
1940	178		18.7%
1950	167		−6.2%
1960	209		25.1%
1970	134		−35.9%
1980	134		0.0%
1990	131		−2.2%
2000	126		−3.8%
2010	131		4.0%
2020	117		−10.7%
U.S. Decennial Census

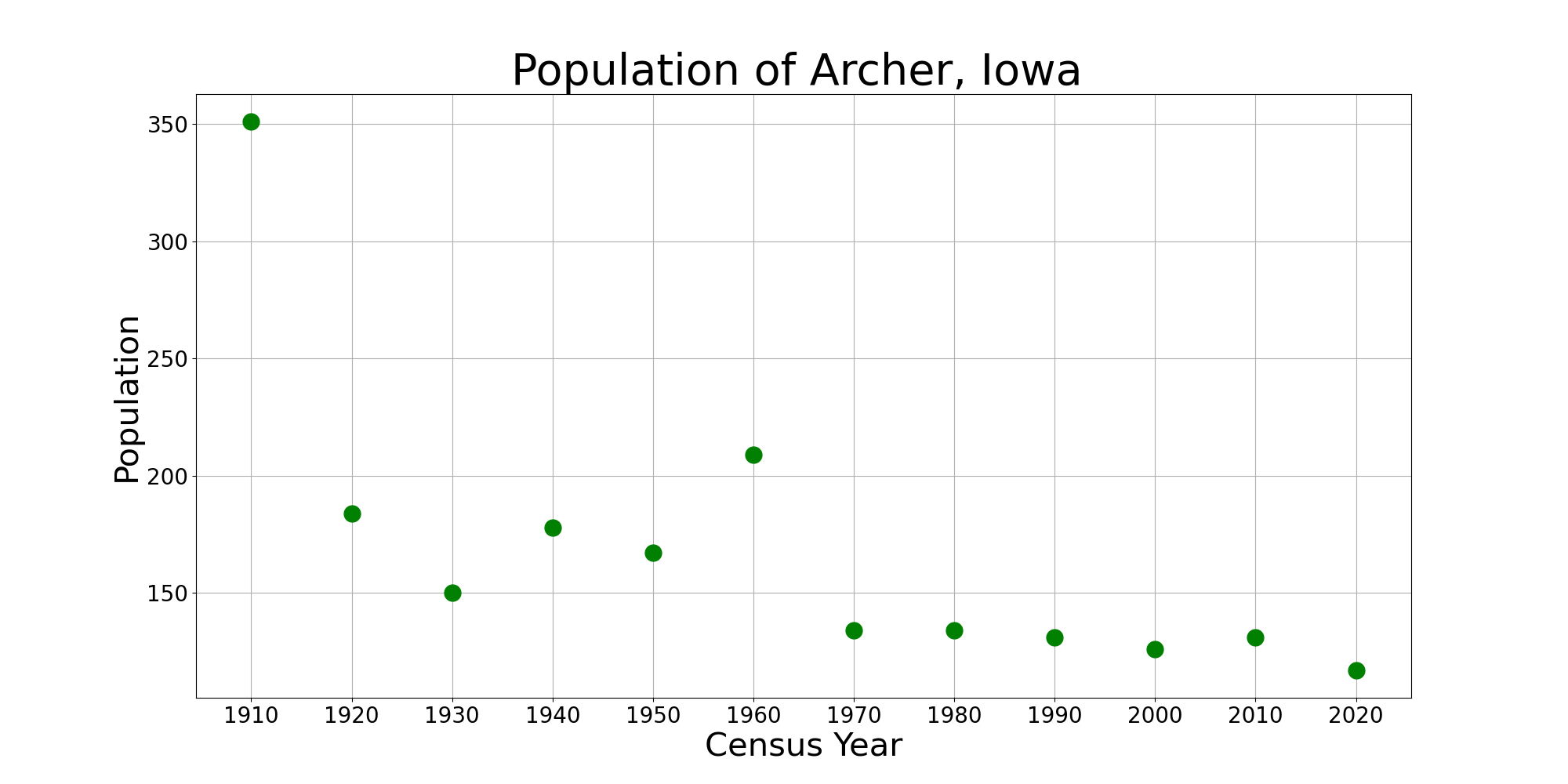
The population of Archer, Iowa from US census data

=== 2020 census ===
As of the census of 2020, there were 117 people, 57 households, and 43 families residing in the city. The population density was 1,369.9 inhabitants per square mile (528.9/km^{2}). There were 57 housing units at an average density of 667.4 per square mile (257.7/km^{2}). The racial makeup of the city was 95.7% White, 0.0% Black or African American, 0.9% Native American, 0.9% Asian, 0.0% Pacific Islander, 0.9% from other races and 1.7% from two or more races. Hispanic or Latino persons of any race comprised 5.1% of the population.

Of the 57 households, 43.9% of which had children under the age of 18 living with them, 56.1% were married couples living together, 5.3% were cohabitating couples, 15.8% had a female householder with no spouse or partner present and 22.8% had a male householder with no spouse or partner present. 24.6% of all households were non-families. 15.8% of all households were made up of individuals, 5.3% had someone living alone who was 65 years old or older.

The median age in the city was 39.5 years. 23.9% of the residents were under the age of 20; 6.8% were between the ages of 20 and 24; 28.2% were from 25 and 44; 18.8% were from 45 and 64; and 22.2% were 65 years of age or older. The gender makeup of the city was 47.9% male and 52.1% female.

=== 2010 census ===
As of the census of 2010, there were 131 people, 58 households, and 38 families residing in the city. The population density was 1,455.6 inhabitants per square mile (562.0/km^{2}). There were 63 housing units at an average density of 700.0 per square mile (270.3/km^{2}). The racial makeup of the city was 89.3% White, 3.1% Asian, 2.3% from other races, and 5.3% from two or more races. Hispanic or Latino of any race were 7.6% of the population.

There were 58 households, of which 27.6% had children under the age of 18 living with them, 56.9% were married couples living together, 6.9% had a female householder with no husband present, 1.7% had a male householder with no wife present, and 34.5% were non-families. 29.3% of all households were made up of individuals, and 15.5% had someone living alone who was 65 years of age or older. The average household size was 2.26 and the average family size was 2.79.

The median age in the city was 37.5 years. 26.7% of residents were under the age of 18; 2.3% were between the ages of 18 and 24; 25.9% were from 25 to 44; 19.8% were from 45 to 64; and 25.2% were 65 years of age or older. The gender makeup of the city was 50.4% male and 49.6% female.

The median income for a household in the city was $34,688, and the median income for a family was $39,167. Males had a median income of $26,375 versus $20,833 for females. The per capita income for the city was $15,958. There were no families and 1.6% of the population living below the poverty line, including no under eighteens and 6.1% of those over 64.

== Education ==
Archer is served by the Sheldon Community School District.
