= Sheldon High School (Iowa) =

Public secondary school in Sheldon, Iowa, United States

Location
- 1700 East Fourth Street; Sheldon, Iowa, 51201; United States; 43.184°N 95.835°W

Information
- Type: Public secondary
- Motto: Right To the Last Child
- School district: Sheldon Community School District
- NCES District ID: 1925980
- Superintendent: Cory Myer
- CEEB code: 163995
- NCES School ID: 192598001474
- Principal: Nick Miller
- Teaching staff: 26.32 (FTE)
- Grades: 9-12
- Enrollment: 356 (2024-2025)
- Student to teacher ratio: 13.53
- Colors: Orange and Black
- Athletics conference: Siouxland Conference
- Mascot: Orabs
- Website: Official website

Sheldon High School is a rural public high school in Sheldon, Iowa, serving students of the Sheldon Community School District in grades 9-12. The school mascot is the Orab, a portmanteau of the school colors, orange and black. Athletic competitions have taken place in the Siouxland Conference since 2009, when the school moved from the Lakes Conference.

Nick Miller has been principal of Sheldon High School since February 8, 2023. During his second year, Miller proposed a new cell phone usage policy to the school board, which would see students place their phones in magnetic locking pouches during the school day, a step up from the previous policy, which saw students place their phones in caddies during class periods. The policy was set to start in mid-October, starting a few weeks later due to delays in funding. This policy has seen mixed results from study body and parents, with some parents feeling their children's rights are being infringed upon.

== Athletics ==
The Orabs are members of the Siouxland Conference, and participate in the following sports:

- Football
- Cross Country
  - Boys' 1971 Class A and 1981 Class 2A State Champions
- Volleyball
- Basketball
  - Boys' 2013 Class 2A State Champions
- Wrestling
- Golf
  - Boys' 1960 Class B State Champions
- Track and Field
  - Boys' 1982 Class 3A State Champions
  - Girls' 1984 Class 2A State Champions
- Baseball
- Softball

The Sheldon boys basketball team secured a berth in the 2013 Iowa High School basketball tournament, and went on to win the 2A state championship by upsetting #1 ranked West Fork of Sheffield 48-36 in the final. This was Sheldon's first state title in basketball, and their first appearance in the state tournament since 1977.

== Sheldon High School Summer Theatre ==
Begun in 1972 by Jay Shelp, Sheldon High School Summer Theatre is the only high school repertory company in the state of Iowa and one of only a few in the United States. SHSST presents six full-length shows over the course of six weeks during June and July. Students are responsible for all aspects of production. The program is mainly staffed by SHSST alumni. Lissa Lane-Johnson directs the program.

== Notable people ==
=== Alumni ===
- Terry Brands, wrestler
- Tom Brands, wrestler
- AG Kruger, hammer thrower

=== Faculty ===
- Bob Vander Plaats, former principal

== See also ==
- List of high schools in Iowa
