= Sheldon, Iowa =

- City
- Motto: Families Come First
- Location of Sheldon, Iowa
- Coordinates: 43°10′52″N 95°50′51″W
- Country: USA
- State: Iowa
- Counties: O'Brien, Sioux

Government
  - Type: Mayor-council

Area
  - Total: 4.75 sq mi (12.29 km^{2})
  - Land: 4.75 sq mi (12.29 km^{2})
  - Water: 0 sq mi (0.00 km^{2})
- Elevation: 1,434 ft (437 m)

Population (2020)
  - Total: 5,512
  - Density: 1,161.6/sq mi (448.48/km^{2})
- Time zone: UTC-6 (Central (CST))
  - Summer (DST): UTC-5 (CDT)
- ZIP code: 51201
- Area code: 712
- FIPS code: 19-72390
- GNIS feature ID: 2395868
- Website: www.sheldoniowa.com

Sheldon is a city in O'Brien and Sioux counties in the U.S. state of Iowa, along the Floyd River. The population was 5,512 at the time of the 2020 census; it is the largest city in O'Brien County.

== History and culture ==
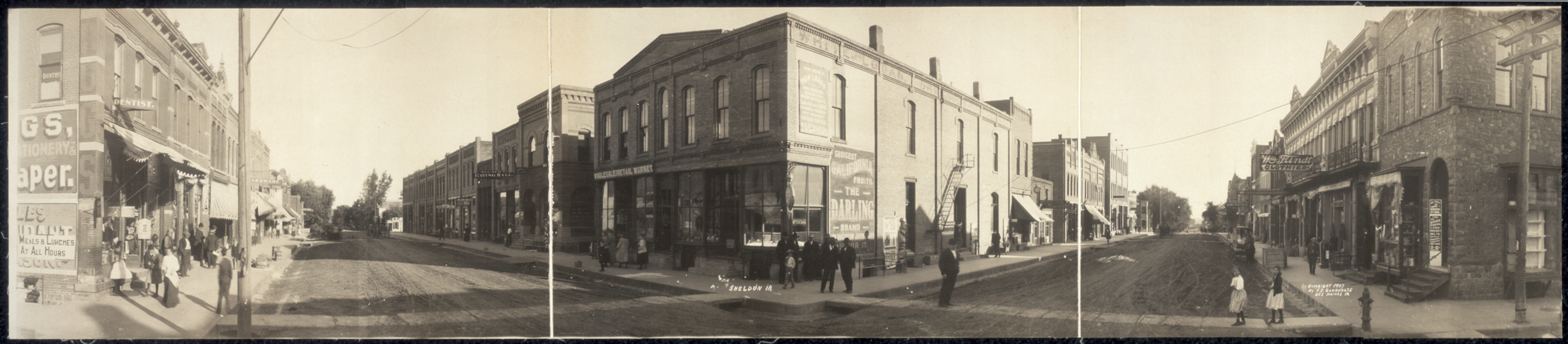
Photographic print of the city as seen in 1907

Sheldon got its start in the year 1873, following construction of the Sioux City & St. Paul Railroad through that territory. It was named for Israel Sheldon, a railroad promoter. It was a strategic location on the rail for businesses from as far away as Minneapolis and Omaha, after the addition of the intersection with the Chicago, Milwaukee and St. Paul Railway in 1878.

The growth in infrastructure has continued. Today, the city lies at the crossroads of Iowa Highway 60 and U.S. Route 18. Eastbound and westbound rail service is provided by IC&E Railroad (since 2008 a subsidiary of Canadian Pacific Railway), while northbound and southbound service is provided by Union Pacific Railroad.

The city's first financial institution, the Sheldon State Bank, closed in 1903. In 1961, the city made headlines when it was revealed that Burnice Geiger had embezzled more than two million dollars from the Sheldon National Bank, operated by her father. She was sentenced to fifteen years in prison in the same year, but paroled in 1966.

Today, the city is most known for its annual display of marigolds and the moniker of its local schools' athletic teams—the Orabs. The name stands for the school colors orange and black. Sheldon High School also hosts the Sheldon High School Summer Theatre program. Sheldon is the home of Northwest Iowa Community College and the Carnegie Library, which was placed on the National Register of Historic Places in 1977.

== In popular culture ==
Sheldon was mentioned on page 13 of the Tim O'Brien book If I Die in a Combat Zone, Box Me Up and Ship Me Home: "Together we watched trombones and crepe-paper floats move down mainstreet. The bands and floats represented Sheldon, Tyler, Sibley, Jackson, and a dozen other neighboring towns".

Ken Snyder (born 1949), pastor of the Parkview Assembly of God in Sheldon, self-released a record album entitled Ken: By Request Only in 1976. The record jacket—featuring Snyder in now-outdated hair and clothes—has made the LP popular on websites that highlight unusual-looking album covers. (Snyder retired as pastor in 2018 and was elected to the Sheldon city council in 2021.)

== Geography ==
According to the United States Census Bureau, the city has a total area of 4.50 square miles (11.65 km^{2}), all land.

=== Climate ===
Climate data for Sheldon, Iowa (1991−2020 normals, extremes 1899−2019)
Month	Jan	Feb	Mar	Apr	May	Jun	Jul	Aug	Sep	Oct	Nov	Dec	Year
Record high °F (°C)	69 (21)	66 (19)	86 (30)	98 (37)	107 (42)	104 (40)	110 (43)	107 (42)	104 (40)	94 (34)	77 (25)	66 (19)	110 (43)
Mean maximum °F (°C)	46.0 (7.8)	51.9 (11.1)	69.2 (20.7)	82.7 (28.2)	88.2 (31.2)	92.2 (33.4)	93.6 (34.2)	92.0 (33.3)	88.2 (31.2)	81.5 (27.5)	65.1 (18.4)	48.4 (9.1)	95.2 (35.1)
Mean daily maximum °F (°C)	24.6 (−4.1)	29.5 (−1.4)	42.5 (5.8)	57.0 (13.9)	69.0 (20.6)	79.2 (26.2)	82.7 (28.2)	80.3 (26.8)	74.0 (23.3)	60.5 (15.8)	43.9 (6.6)	29.6 (−1.3)	56.1 (13.4)
Daily mean °F (°C)	14.9 (−9.5)	19.3 (−7.1)	31.9 (−0.1)	44.7 (7.1)	57.6 (14.2)	68.2 (20.1)	71.5 (21.9)	68.9 (20.5)	60.9 (16.1)	47.5 (8.6)	32.8 (0.4)	20.3 (−6.5)	44.9 (7.2)
Mean daily minimum °F (°C)	5.2 (−14.9)	9.1 (−12.7)	21.3 (−5.9)	32.4 (0.2)	46.2 (7.9)	57.2 (14.0)	60.4 (15.8)	57.5 (14.2)	47.9 (8.8)	34.6 (1.4)	21.6 (−5.8)	11.0 (−11.7)	33.7 (0.9)
Mean minimum °F (°C)	−17.3 (−27.4)	−12.6 (−24.8)	0.3 (−17.6)	17.4 (−8.1)	31.2 (−0.4)	42.7 (5.9)	48.0 (8.9)	44.9 (7.2)	30.8 (−0.7)	18.9 (−7.3)	3.2 (−16.0)	−12.6 (−24.8)	−22.0 (−30.0)
Record low °F (°C)	−32 (−36)	−35 (−37)	−24 (−31)	2 (−17)	17 (−8)	33 (1)	41 (5)	33 (1)	15 (−9)	−9 (−23)	−20 (−29)	−28 (−33)	−35 (−37)
Average precipitation inches (mm)	0.88 (22)	1.00 (25)	1.91 (49)	3.22 (82)	4.03 (102)	4.67 (119)	3.61 (92)	3.26 (83)	3.39 (86)	2.43 (62)	1.52 (39)	1.17 (30)	31.09 (790)
Average snowfall inches (cm)	8.7 (22)	7.2 (18)	6.6 (17)	3.3 (8.4)	0.2 (0.51)	0.0 (0.0)	0.0 (0.0)	0.0 (0.0)	0.0 (0.0)	0.5 (1.3)	4.7 (12)	9.6 (24)	40.8 (104)
Average precipitation days (≥ 0.01 in)	7.0	6.5	7.8	10.2	13.2	11.7	8.6	9.2	8.6	7.8	5.9	7.1	103.6
Average snowy days (≥ 0.1 in)	6.0	5.2	3.5	1.5	0.1	0.0	0.0	0.0	0.0	0.7	2.6	5.8	25.4
Source: NOAA (mean maxima/minima 1981–2010)

== Demographics ==
Historical population
Census	Pop.	Note	%±
1880	730		—
1890	1,478		102.5%
1900	2,282		54.4%
1910	2,941		28.9%
1920	3,488		18.6%
1930	3,820		9.5%
1940	3,768		−1.4%
1950	4,001		6.2%
1960	4,251		6.2%
1970	4,535		6.7%
1980	5,003		10.3%
1990	4,937		−1.3%
2000	4,914		−0.5%
2010	5,188		5.6%
2020	5,512		6.2%
U.S. Decennial Census

=== 2020 census ===
As of the 2020 census, Sheldon had a population of 5,512 people, 2,186 households, and 1,325 families. The median age was 37.0 years. 23.0% of residents were under the age of 18 and 19.7% of residents were 65 years of age or older. For every 100 females there were 101.9 males, and for every 100 females age 18 and over there were 100.4 males age 18 and over.

97.6% of residents lived in urban areas, while 2.4% lived in rural areas.

There were 2,186 households in Sheldon, of which 28.3% had children under the age of 18 living in them. Of all households, 48.4% were married-couple households, 21.1% were households with a male householder and no spouse or partner present, and 24.6% were households with a female householder and no spouse or partner present. Nonfamily households accounted for 39.4% of all households. About 34.1% of all households were made up of individuals, and 14.8% had someone living alone who was 65 years of age or older.

There were 2,421 housing units, of which 9.7% were vacant. The homeowner vacancy rate was 1.8% and the rental vacancy rate was 9.9%. The population density was 1,161.6 inhabitants per square mile (448.5/km^{2}), and the housing unit density was 510.2 per square mile (197.0/km^{2}).

Racial composition as of the 2020 census
Race	Number	Percent
White	4,694	85.2%
Black or African American	75	1.4%
American Indian and Alaska Native	47	0.9%
Asian	54	1.0%
Native Hawaiian and Other Pacific Islander	11	0.2%
Some other race	274	5.0%
Two or more races	357	6.5%
Hispanic or Latino (of any race)	647	11.7%

=== 2010 census ===
At the 2010 census there were 5,188 people, 2,213 households, and 1,300 families living in the city. The population density was 1,152.9 inhabitants per square mile (445.1/km^{2}). There were 2,365 housing units at an average density of 525.6 per square mile (202.9/km^{2}). The racial makeup of the city was 93.7% White, 0.6% African American, 1.1% Asian, 3.7% from other races, and 0.8% from two or more races. Hispanic or Latino of any race were 6.5%.

Of the 2,213 households 26.3% had children under the age of 18 living with them, 49.6% were married couples living together, 6.3% had a female householder with no husband present, 2.9% had a male householder with no wife present, and 41.3% were non-families. 35.0% of households were one person and 17.5% were one person aged 65 or older. The average household size was 2.28 and the average family size was 2.96.

The median age was 39.4 years. 23.1% of residents were under the age of 18; 9.5% were between the ages of 18 and 24; 24.1% were from 25 to 44; 24.8% were from 45 to 64; and 18.6% were 65 or older. The gender makeup of the city was 50.7% male and 49.3% female.

=== 2000 census ===
At the 2000 census there were 4,914 people, 2,006 households, and 1,285 families living in the city. The population density was 1,119.6 inhabitants per square mile (432.3/km^{2}). There were 2,126 housing units at an average density of 484.4 per square mile (187.0/km^{2}). The racial makeup of the city was 97.48% White, 0.43% African American, 0.06% Native American, 0.77% Asian, 0.81% from other races, and 0.45% from two or more races. Hispanic or Latino of any race were 2.56%.

Of the 2,006 households 29.0% had children under the age of 18 living with them, 56.5% were married couples living together, 4.9% had a female householder with no husband present, and 35.9% were non-families. 31.2% of households were one person and 13.0% were one person aged 65 or older. The average household size was 2.34 and the average family size was 2.96.

Age spread: 23.6% under the age of 18, 10.8% from 18 to 24, 24.9% from 25 to 44, 21.2% from 45 to 64, and 19.5% 65 or older. The median age was 38 years. For every 100 females, there were 95.9 males. For every 100 females age 18 and over, there were 94.1 males.

The median household income was $34,058 and the median family income was $43,346. Males had a median income of $31,026 versus $20,604 for females. The per capita income for the city was $18,254. About 3.6% of families and 7.6% of the population were below the poverty line, including 8.1% of those under age 18 and 6.2% of those age 65 or over.

== Education ==
Sheldon is served by the Sheldon Community School District, which include Sheldon High School. There are two private schools, both of which offer preschool services through the eighth grade, the Sheldon Christian School and the St. Patrick's Catholic School.

Sheldon is also home to Northwest Iowa Community College, a two-year associate degree community college.

== Notable people ==
- William D. Boies (1857–1932), lawyer and politician
- Terry Brands (born 1968) two-time World Champion in freestyle wrestling
- Tom Brands (born 1968) World Champion and Olympic
- Eugene Burdick (1918–1965) writer
- George Kelly (1905–1967), American educational and existentialist psychologist
- A.G. Kruger (born 1979), competitor at the 2004 and 2008 Summer Olympic Games
- Gerrit Roorda (1890–1977), Dutch communist politician
- Dennis Marion Schnurr (born 1948), Archbishop of the Roman Catholic Archdiocese of Cincinnati, Ohio
- Michael J. Streit (born 1950), former Iowa Supreme Court justice

== Media ==
Sheldon is home to a KIWA (AM) and KIWA-FM.

Iowa Information Media Group publishes The Sheldon Mail-Sun and The N'West Iowa Review. The N'West Iowa Review has been named the state's Newspaper of the Year 17 times, and named the best weekly in the United States by the National Newspaper Association from 2000 to 2005, and again in 2007.
