= Carnegie Library (Sheldon, Iowa) =

- U.S. National Register of Historic Places
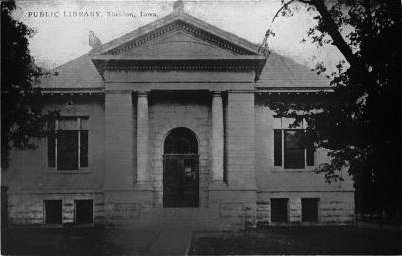

- Location within Iowa Location within the United States
- Location: 321 10th St. Sheldon, Iowa
- Coordinates: 43°10′47″N 95°51′14″W
- Area: less than one acre
- Built: 1908
- Architectural style: Beaux Arts
- NRHP reference No.: 77001504
- Added to NRHP: April 11, 1977

The Carnegie Library in Sheldon, Iowa is a building from 1908. It was listed on the National Register of Historic Places in 1977. In 1969, the library was moved and 7 years later the building became the Sheldon Prairie Museum.
