= Grant Township, O'Brien County, Iowa =

Township in O'Brien County, Iowa, U.S.

Coordinates: 43.0422°N 95.4400°W

Grant Township is a township in O'Brien County, Iowa, United States.

== History ==
Grant Township was founded in 1870.
