= South O'Brien Community School District =

Public school district in Paullina, Iowa, United States

Coordinates: 42.977464°N 95.689605°W

Location
- Paullina, Iowa O'Brien, Clay, and Cherokee counties United States
- Coordinates: 42.977464, -95.689605

District information
- Type: Local school district
- Grades: K-12
- Established: 1993
- Superintendent: Wade Riley
- Schools: 2
- Budget: $10,066,000 (2020-21)
- NCES District ID: 1900026

Students and staff
- Students: 576 (2022-23)
- Teachers: 43.88 FTE
- Staff: 59.70 FTE
- Student–teacher ratio: 13.10
- Athletic conference: War Eagle
- District mascot: Wolverines
- Colors: Black and Silver

Other information
- Website: www.soswolverines.org

South O'Brien Community School District is a rural public school district headquartered in Paullina, Iowa. Its junior and senior high school is also in Paullina, while the preschool through elementary school is in Primghar.

It is mostly in O'Brien County, with small sections in Clay and Cherokee counties. It serves the municipalities of Paullina, Primghar, Calumet, and Sutherland. It also serves the unincorporated areas of Gaza and Germantown as well as other areas.

== History ==
The district was formed on July 1, 1993, by the merger of three school districts: Paullina, Primghar, and Sutherland.

Dan Moore began his term as a superintendent in 2009; in 2019 he announced plans to retire by summer 2020, making him the longest-serving superintendent in the district's history.

== Schools ==
The district operates two schools:

- South O'Brien Elementary School, Primghar
- South O'Brien Secondary School, Paullina

=== South O'Brien High School ===
==== Athletics ====
The Wolverines compete in the War Eagle Conference in the following sports:

- Cross Country
- Volleyball
- Football
- Basketball
  - 2016 Class 1A State Champions
- Wrestling
- Track and Field
- Golf
- Baseball
- Softball

== See also ==
- List of school districts in Iowa
- List of high schools in Iowa
