= Sanborn, Iowa =

- City
- Location of Sanborn, Iowa
- Coordinates: 43°10′53″N 95°39′19″W
- Country: USA
- State: Iowa
- County: O'Brien

Government
  - Type: Mayor-council

Area
  - Total: 1.88 sq mi (4.86 km^{2})
  - Land: 1.88 sq mi (4.86 km^{2})
  - Water: 0 sq mi (0.00 km^{2})
- Elevation: 1,555 ft (474 m)

Population (2020)
  - Total: 1,392
  - Density: 741.3/sq mi (286.22/km^{2})
- Time zone: UTC-6 (Central (CST))
  - Summer (DST): UTC-5 (CDT)
- ZIP code: 51248
- Area code: 712
- FIPS code: 19-70410
- GNIS feature ID: 2396532
- Website: City of Sanborn

Sanborn is a city in O'Brien County, Iowa, United States. The population was 1,392 at the time of the 2020 census.

== History ==
Sanborn got its start in the year 1871, following construction of the Chicago, Milwaukee & St. Paul Railway through that territory. It was named for George W. Sanborn, the railroad president. Sanborn was incorporated as a town in 1880.

== Geography ==
According to the United States Census Bureau, the city has a total area of 1.90 square miles (4.92 km^{2}), all land.

=== Climate ===
Climate data for Sanborn, Iowa (1991−2020 normals, extremes 1914−present)
Month	Jan	Feb	Mar	Apr	May	Jun	Jul	Aug	Sep	Oct	Nov	Dec	Year
Record high °F (°C)	65 (18)	65 (18)	84 (29)	92 (33)	107 (42)	102 (39)	110 (43)	108 (42)	103 (39)	92 (33)	77 (25)	65 (18)	110 (43)
Mean maximum °F (°C)	44.1 (6.7)	49.3 (9.6)	67.3 (19.6)	79.8 (26.6)	87.9 (31.1)	91.4 (33.0)	91.7 (33.2)	90.5 (32.5)	87.3 (30.7)	81.7 (27.6)	64.8 (18.2)	48.0 (8.9)	93.8 (34.3)
Mean daily maximum °F (°C)	24.0 (−4.4)	28.3 (−2.1)	41.5 (5.3)	56.5 (13.6)	68.7 (20.4)	78.9 (26.1)	82.5 (28.1)	80.0 (26.7)	73.5 (23.1)	59.7 (15.4)	43.1 (6.2)	28.9 (−1.7)	55.5 (13.1)
Daily mean °F (°C)	15.0 (−9.4)	19.2 (−7.1)	31.8 (−0.1)	45.1 (7.3)	57.8 (14.3)	68.4 (20.2)	72.2 (22.3)	69.8 (21.0)	61.8 (16.6)	48.4 (9.1)	33.2 (0.7)	20.6 (−6.3)	45.3 (7.4)
Mean daily minimum °F (°C)	6.1 (−14.4)	10.2 (−12.1)	22.1 (−5.5)	33.8 (1.0)	46.9 (8.3)	58.0 (14.4)	62.0 (16.7)	59.6 (15.3)	50.2 (10.1)	37.1 (2.8)	23.4 (−4.8)	12.3 (−10.9)	35.1 (1.7)
Mean minimum °F (°C)	−16.4 (−26.9)	−11.3 (−24.1)	−0.3 (−17.9)	18.3 (−7.6)	32.6 (0.3)	45.9 (7.7)	51.2 (10.7)	49.4 (9.7)	35.1 (1.7)	20.2 (−6.6)	5.3 (−14.8)	−10.4 (−23.6)	−19.9 (−28.8)
Record low °F (°C)	−33 (−36)	−35 (−37)	−20 (−29)	3 (−16)	16 (−9)	34 (1)	38 (3)	34 (1)	22 (−6)	2 (−17)	−16 (−27)	−29 (−34)	−35 (−37)
Average precipitation inches (mm)	0.91 (23)	1.10 (28)	1.90 (48)	3.40 (86)	4.49 (114)	4.86 (123)	3.37 (86)	3.50 (89)	3.31 (84)	2.47 (63)	1.59 (40)	1.17 (30)	32.07 (815)
Average snowfall inches (cm)	8.2 (21)	9.1 (23)	6.3 (16)	3.2 (8.1)	0.1 (0.25)	0.0 (0.0)	0.0 (0.0)	0.0 (0.0)	0.0 (0.0)	0.5 (1.3)	4.5 (11)	9.5 (24)	41.4 (105)
Average precipitation days (≥ 0.01 in)	7.5	6.3	7.7	10.3	13.7	12.3	8.8	9.2	8.8	8.2	5.9	6.9	105.6
Average snowy days (≥ 0.1 in)	5.5	4.8	3.1	1.5	0.1	0.0	0.0	0.0	0.0	0.6	2.7	4.9	23.2
Source: NOAA

== Demographics ==
Historical population
Census	Pop.	Note	%±
1880	364		—
1890	1,075		195.3%
1900	1,247		16.0%
1910	1,174		−5.9%
1920	1,497		27.5%
1930	1,213		−19.0%
1940	1,344		10.8%
1950	1,337		−0.5%
1960	1,323		−1.0%
1970	1,465		10.7%
1980	1,398		−4.6%
1990	1,345		−3.8%
2000	1,353		0.6%
2010	1,404		3.8%
2020	1,392		−0.9%
U.S. Decennial Census

=== 2020 census ===
As of the 2020 census, there were 1,392 people, 579 households, and 334 families residing in the city. The population density was 741.3 inhabitants per square mile (286.2/km^{2}). There were 639 housing units at an average density of 340.3 per square mile (131.4/km^{2}).

The median age in the city was 42.7 years. 23.3% of residents were under the age of 18 and 26.7% were 65 years of age or older. 4.2% of residents were between the ages of 20 and 24, 22.2% were from 25 to 44, and 21.3% were from 45 to 64. The gender makeup of the city was 48.4% male and 51.6% female. For every 100 females there were 93.9 males, and for every 100 females age 18 and over there were 89.2 males age 18 and over.

Of all households, 26.4% had children under the age of 18 living with them. Of all households, 49.2% were married-couple households, 5.4% were cohabiting-couple households, 19.9% were households with a male householder and no spouse or partner present, and 25.6% were households with a female householder and no spouse or partner present. 42.3% of households were non-families, 38.2% were made up of individuals, and 20.2% had someone living alone who was 65 years of age or older.

Of all housing units, 9.4% were vacant. The homeowner vacancy rate was 1.6% and the rental vacancy rate was 11.6%.

0.0% of residents lived in urban areas, while 100.0% lived in rural areas.

Racial composition as of the 2020 census
Race	Number	Percent
White	1,281	92.0%
Black or African American	26	1.9%
American Indian and Alaska Native	16	1.1%
Asian	10	0.7%
Native Hawaiian and Other Pacific Islander	0	0.0%
Some other race	18	1.3%
Two or more races	41	2.9%
Hispanic or Latino (of any race)	70	5.0%

=== 2010 census ===
As of the census of 2010, there were 1,404 people, 574 households, and 356 families living in the city. The population density was 738.9 inhabitants per square mile (285.3/km^{2}). There were 614 housing units at an average density of 323.2 per square mile (124.8/km^{2}). The racial makeup of the city was 97.6% White, 0.5% African American, 0.1% Native American, 0.1% Asian, 1.5% from other races, and 0.1% from two or more races. Hispanic or Latino of any race were 2.3% of the population.

There were 574 households, of which 28.0% had children under the age of 18 living with them, 52.3% were married couples living together, 6.3% had a female householder with no husband present, 3.5% had a male householder with no wife present, and 38.0% were non-families. 34.7% of all households were made up of individuals, and 21.8% had someone living alone who was 65 years of age or older. The average household size was 2.33 and the average family size was 3.01.

The median age in the city was 44.2 years. 24.4% of residents were under the age of 18; 7.1% were between the ages of 18 and 24; 19.1% were from 25 to 44; 23.3% were from 45 to 64; and 26.1% were 65 years of age or older. The gender makeup of the city was 47.5% male and 52.5% female.

=== 2000 census ===
As of the census of 2000, there were 1,353 people, 558 households, and 372 families living in the city. The population density was 747.1 inhabitants per square mile (288.5/km^{2}). There were 593 housing units at an average density of 327.5 per square mile (126.4/km^{2}). The racial makeup of the city was 99.41% White, 0.07% African American, 0.07% Native American, 0.15% from other races, and 0.30% from two or more races. Hispanic or Latino of any race were 0.44% of the population.

There were 558 households, out of which 23.8% had children under the age of 18 living with them, 61.6% were married couples living together, 3.9% had a female householder with no husband present, and 33.3% were non-families. 30.8% of all households were made up of individuals, and 18.8% had someone living alone who was 65 years of age or older. The average household size was 2.28 and the average family size was 2.84.

20.7% were under the age of 18, 6.8% from 18 to 24, 20.3% from 25 to 44, 21.4% from 45 to 64, and 30.9% were 65 years of age or older. The median age was 46 years. For every 100 females, there were 86.9 males. For every 100 females age 18 and over, there were 82.8 males.

The median income for a household in the city was $34,250, and the median income for a family was $42,500. Males had a median income of $31,792 versus $19,750 for females. The per capita income for the city was $18,189. About 2.8% of families and 4.8% of the population were below the poverty line, including 4.7% of those under age 18 and 3.2% of those age 65 or over.

== Education ==
Sanborn is served by the Hartley–Melvin–Sanborn Community School District, which formed on July 1, 1991, with the merger of the Hartley–Melvin and Sanborn districts. Sanborn is home to the Hartley–Melvin–Sanborn Middle School.

Sanborn is home to the Sanborn Christian School, a private school that serves grades preschool through eighth grade.

== Notable people ==
- William D. Boies (1857–1932), U.S. representative from Iowa
- Neva Boyd (1876–1963), sociologist
- Will Kirk Kaynor (1884–1929), U.S. representative from Massachusetts
- Otto Puhlman (1837–1924), Wisconsin state representative
