= Hartley Township, O'Brien County, Iowa =

Township in O'Brien County, Iowa, U.S.

Coordinates: 43.213°N 95.447°W

Hartley Township is a township in O'Brien County, Iowa, United States.

== History ==
Hartley Township was founded in 1879.
