= Waterman Township, O'Brien County, Iowa =

Township in O'Brien County, Iowa

Coordinates: 42.953°N 95.447°W

Waterman Township is a township in O'Brien County, Iowa, United States.

== History ==
Waterman Township was founded in 1869. It was named for Hannibal H. Waterman, a pioneer settler.
