= Center Township, O'Brien County, Iowa =

Township in O'Brien County, Iowa, U.S.

Coordinates: 43.1277°N 95.5649°W

Center Township is a township in O'Brien County, Iowa, United States.

== History ==
Center Township was founded in 1871.
