= Corwin Township, Ida County, Iowa =

Township in Iowa, USA

Coordinates: 42°20′N 95°29′W

Corwin Township is a township in Ida County, Iowa, United States. The city of Ida Grove occupies a portion of the township.
