= KIWA-FM =

- Sheldon, Iowa; United States
- Frequency: 105.3 MHz
- Branding: The Heart of Rock

Programming
- Format: Classic rock

Ownership
- Owner: Neil Lipetzky, Dean Sorenson, and Duane Butt; (Community First Broadcasting, LLC)

History
- First air date: October 1, 1971

Technical information
- Licensing authority: FCC
- Facility ID: 60089
- Class: C2
- Power: 50,000 watts
- HAAT: 89 meters
- Transmitter coordinates: 43°10′53″N 95°51′56″W

Links
- Public license information: Public file; LMS
- Webcast: Listen live
- Website: kiwaradio.com

KIWA-FM (105.3) is a commercial radio station serving the Sheldon, Iowa area. The station primarily broadcasts a classic rock format. It also broadcasts local sports and weather.

KIWA-FM and sister station KIWA (AM) are owned by Neil Lipetzky, Dean Sorenson, and Duane Butt, through licensee Community First Broadcasting, LLC. Studios are located at 411 9th St. in Sheldon. The stations also share a transmitter site behind the National Guard facility, on Sheldon's west side.
