= O'Brien County Courthouse =

- U.S. National Register of Historic Places
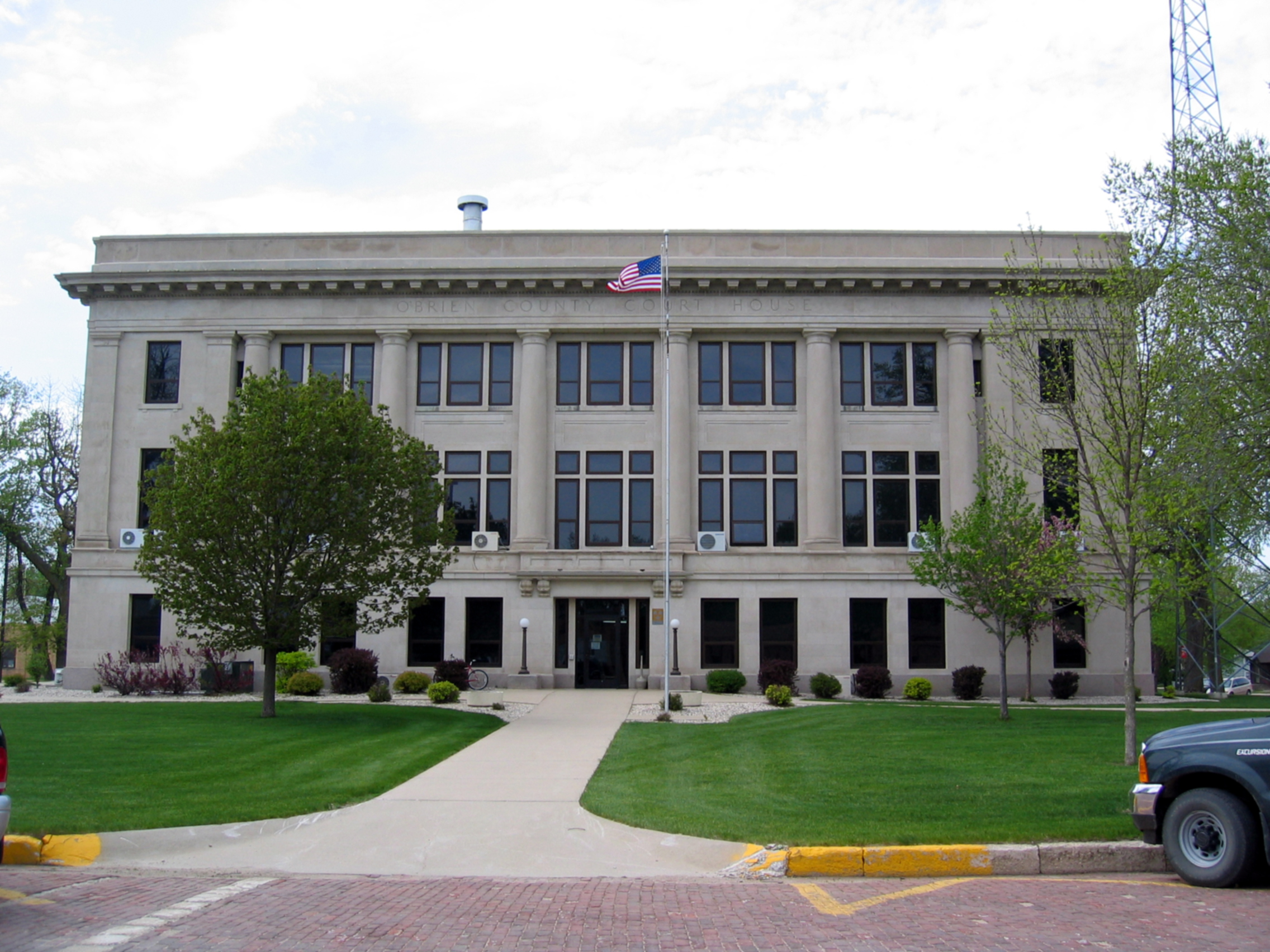

- Location within Iowa Location within the United States
- Location: Fir Ave. Primghar, Iowa
- Coordinates: 43°5′12″N 95°37′38″W
- Area: less than one acre
- Built: 1917
- Built by: L.E. Lovejoy
- Architect: Smith & Loeffer
- Architectural style: Beaux Arts
- MPS: County Courthouses in Iowa TR
- NRHP reference No.: 81000656
- Added to NRHP: July 2, 1981

The O'Brien County Courthouse is located in Primghar, Iowa, United States. It was listed on the National Register of Historic Places in 1981 as a part of the County Courthouses in Iowa Thematic Resource. The courthouse is the fourth building the county has used for court functions and county administration.

== History ==
The county's first courthouse was a log building built on a farm for about $2,000 in 1860. It was later moved to a different location where it served as a schoolhouse, blacksmith shop, and a stable. The county's second courthouse was completed in April 1874 for about $2,000 as well. It was built in the recently established county seat of Primghar. That building was replaced by the third courthouse that was built in 1887 for $6,000. The building measured 50 by 54 feet (15 by 16 m). An addition was built on to the structure in 1902 to create additional space for the county government. The present courthouse was completed in 1915 for $159,000. Designed by the Des Moines architectural firm of Smith & Loeffer, it is a rather austere version of the Beaux Arts style. L.E. Lovejoy was the contractor that was responsible for its construction.

== Architecture ==
The building is three stories tall and the exterior is clad in Bedford stone. It features six Doric columns in antis on the main facade, and rather large windows. The interior corridors are made of marble and the handrails in the stairways are finished in bronze. The significance of the courthouse is derived from its association with county government, and the political power and prestige of Primghar as the county seat.
