= KIWA (AM) =

- Sheldon, Iowa; United States
- Frequency: 1550 kHz

Programming
- Format: News/Talk

Ownership
- Owner: Neil Lipetzky, Dean Sorenson, and Duane Butt; (Community First Broadcasting, LLC)

History
- First air date: October 27, 1961

Technical information
- Licensing authority: FCC
- Facility ID: 60088
- Class: D
- Power: 283 watts (daytime); 6 watts (nighttime)
- Transmitter coordinates: 43°10′53″N 95°51′56″W
- Translator: 100.7 K264CW (Sheldon)

Links
- Public license information: Public file; LMS
- Website: kiwaradio.com

KIWA (1550 AM) is a commercial radio station serving the Sheldon, Iowa area. The station primarily broadcasts a news/talk format. It also broadcasts full coverage of local sports.

KIWA and sister station KIWA-FM are owned by Neil Lipetzky, Dean Sorenson, and Duane Butt, through licensee Community First Broadcasting, LLC. Studios are located at 411 9th St. in Sheldon. The stations also share a transmitter site behind the National Guard facility, on Sheldon's west side.
