= Union Township, O'Brien County, Iowa =

Township in O'Brien County, Iowa, U.S.

Coordinates: 42.954°N 95.682°W

Union Township is a township in O'Brien County, Iowa, United States.

== History ==
Union Township was founded in 1880.
