= Franklin Township, O'Brien County, Iowa =

Township in O'Brien County, Iowa, U.S.

Coordinates: 43.215°N 95.684°W

Franklin Township is a township in O'Brien County, Iowa, United States.

== History ==
Franklin Township was founded in 1878. It was named for Benjamin Franklin.
