= Liberty Township, O'Brien County, Iowa =

Township in O'Brien County, Iowa, U.S.

Coordinates: 42.954°N 95.564°W

Township is a township in O'Brien County, Iowa, United States.

== History ==
Liberty Township was organized in 1869.
