= Caledonia Township, O'Brien County, Iowa =

Township in O'Brien County, Iowa, U.S.

Coordinates: 42.9533°N 95.8003°W

Caledonia Township is a township in O'Brien County, Iowa in the United States.

== History ==
Caledonia Township was founded in 1878.
