= Sutherland, Iowa =

- City
- Location of Sutherland, Iowa
- Coordinates: 42°58′22″N 95°30′02″W
- Country: United States
- State: Iowa
- County: O'Brien

Government
  - Type: Mayor-council

Area
  - Total: 0.85 sq mi (2.20 km^{2})
  - Land: 0.85 sq mi (2.20 km^{2})
  - Water: 0 sq mi (0.00 km^{2})
- Elevation: 1,421 ft (433 m)

Population (2020)
  - Total: 629
  - Density: 740.4/sq mi (285.87/km^{2})
- Time zone: UTC-6 (Central (CST))
  - Summer (DST): UTC-5 (CDT)
- ZIP code: 51058
- Area code: 712
- FIPS code: 19-76485
- GNIS feature ID: 2396011
- Website: City of Sutherland

Sutherland is a city in O'Brien County, Iowa, United States. The population was 629 at the time of the 2020 census.

== History ==
Sutherland was laid out in 1882. The city was named after the Duke of Sutherland.

== Geography ==
According to the United States Census Bureau, the city has a total area of 0.87 square miles (2.25 km^{2}), all land.

== Demographics ==
Historical population
Census	Pop.	Note	%±
1890	490		—
1900	722		47.3%
1910	664		−8.0%
1920	876		31.9%
1930	802		−8.4%
1940	875		9.1%
1950	835		−4.6%
1960	883		5.7%
1970	875		−0.9%
1980	897		2.5%
1990	714		−20.4%
2000	707		−1.0%
2010	649		−8.2%
2020	629		−3.1%
U.S. Decennial Census

=== 2020 census ===
As of the census of 2020, there were 629 people, 302 households, and 154 families residing in the city. The population density was 740.4 inhabitants per square mile (285.9/km^{2}). There were 345 housing units at an average density of 406.1 per square mile (156.8/km^{2}). The racial makeup of the city was 97.1% White, 0.5% Black or African American, 0.0% Native American, 0.0% Asian, 0.0% Pacific Islander, 0.6% from other races and 1.7% from two or more races. Hispanic or Latino persons of any race comprised 1.1% of the population.

Of the 302 households, 16.2% of which had children under the age of 18 living with them, 40.7% were married couples living together, 11.9% were cohabitating couples, 24.5% had a female householder with no spouse or partner present and 22.8% had a male householder with no spouse or partner present. 49.0% of all households were non-families. 39.7% of all households were made up of individuals, 22.8% had someone living alone who was 65 years old or older.

The median age in the city was 53.1 years. 18.0% of the residents were under the age of 20; 2.9% were between the ages of 20 and 24; 21.0% were from 25 and 44; 26.6% were from 45 and 64; and 31.6% were 65 years of age or older. The gender makeup of the city was 50.2% male and 49.8% female.

=== 2010 census ===
As of the census of 2010, there were 649 people, 293 households, and 176 families living in the city. The population density was 746.0 inhabitants per square mile (288.0/km^{2}). There were 353 housing units at an average density of 405.7 per square mile (156.6/km^{2}). The racial makeup of the city was 98.8% White, 0.2% African American, 0.6% Native American, and 0.5% from two or more races. Hispanic or Latino of any race were 0.6% of the population.

There were 293 households, of which 22.2% had children under the age of 18 living with them, 48.8% were married couples living together, 6.1% had a female householder with no husband present, 5.1% had a male householder with no wife present, and 39.9% were non-families. 36.2% of all households were made up of individuals, and 15.3% had someone living alone who was 65 years of age or older. The average household size was 2.11 and the average family size was 2.68.

The median age in the city was 50.4 years. 19.6% of residents were under the age of 18; 4.1% were between the ages of 18 and 24; 19.1% were from 25 to 44; 31.4% were from 45 to 64; and 25.9% were 65 years of age or older. The gender makeup of the city was 49.2% male and 50.8% female.

=== 2000 census ===
As of the census of 2000, there were 707 people, 315 households, and 200 families living in the city. The population density was 810.2 inhabitants per square mile (312.8/km^{2}). There were 348 housing units at an average density of 398.8 per square mile (154.0/km^{2}). The racial makeup of the city was 98.44% White, 0.14% African American, 0.71% Native American, 0.28% from other races, and 0.42% from two or more races. Hispanic or Latino of any race were 0.42% of the population.

There were 315 households, out of which 22.2% had children under the age of 18 living with them, 52.4% were married couples living together, 7.0% had a female householder with no husband present, and 36.5% were non-families. 33.7% of all households were made up of individuals, and 21.3% had someone living alone who was 65 years of age or older. The average household size was 2.15 and the average family size was 2.71.

In the city, the population was spread out, with 20.2% under the age of 18, 5.7% from 18 to 24, 20.5% from 25 to 44, 22.5% from 45 to 64, and 31.1% who were 65 years of age or older. The median age was 47 years. For every 100 females, there were 87.5 males. For every 100 females age 18 and over, there were 82.5 males.

The median income for a household in the city was $31,985, and the median income for a family was $39,250. Males had a median income of $30,000 versus $19,432 for females. The per capita income for the city was $16,345. About 2.0% of families and 3.9% of the population were below the poverty line, including 1.6% of those under age 18 and 3.8% of those age 65 or over.

== Education ==
Sutherland is served by the South O'Brien Community School District. The district was formed on July 1, 1993, by the merger of three school districts: Paullina, Primghar, and Sutherland.

== Notable person ==
- Josh Stamer, football player
