= Paullina, Iowa =

- City
- Motto: Gem of the Prairie
- Location of Paullina, Iowa
- Coordinates: 42°58′48″N 95°41′00″W
- Country: USA
- State: Iowa
- County: O'Brien

Government
  - Type: Mayor-council

Area
  - Total: 0.93 sq mi (2.42 km^{2})
  - Land: 0.93 sq mi (2.42 km^{2})
  - Water: 0 sq mi (0.00 km^{2})
- Elevation: 1,401 ft (427 m)

Population (2020)
  - Total: 982
  - Density: 1,051.4/sq mi (405.93/km^{2})
- Time zone: UTC-6 (Central (CST))
  - Summer (DST): UTC-5 (CDT)
- ZIP code: 51046
- Area code: 712
- FIPS code: 19-61905
- GNIS feature ID: 2396163
- Website: City of Paullina

Paullina is a city in O'Brien County, Iowa, United States. The population was 982 at the 2020 census.

== History ==
Paullina was laid out in 1882 when the Chicago & Northwestern Railway was extended to that point. It was named for the Paullin brothers, who owned the town site.

== Geography ==
According to the United States Census Bureau, the city has a total area of 0.85 square miles (2.20 km^{2}), all land.

== Demographics ==
Historical population
Census	Pop.	Note	%±
1890	510		—
1900	617		21.0%
1910	796		29.0%
1920	987		24.0%
1930	1,013		2.6%
1940	1,230		21.4%
1950	1,289		4.8%
1960	1,329		3.1%
1970	1,257		−5.4%
1980	1,224		−2.6%
1990	1,134		−7.4%
2000	1,124		−0.9%
2010	1,056		−6.0%
2020	982		−7.0%
U.S. Decennial Census

=== 2020 census ===
As of the census of 2020, there were 982 people, 446 households, and 271 families residing in the city. The population density was 1,051.4 inhabitants per square mile (405.9/km^{2}). There were 509 housing units at an average density of 544.9 per square mile (210.4/km^{2}). The racial makeup of the city was 95.5% White, 0.8% Black or African American, 0.1% Native American, 0.0% Asian, 0.0% Pacific Islander, 0.9% from other races and 2.6% from two or more races. Hispanic or Latino persons of any race comprised 3.0% of the population.

Of the 446 households, 26.9% of which had children under the age of 18 living with them, 48.7% were married couples living together, 7.0% were cohabitating couples, 25.1% had a female householder with no spouse or partner present and 19.3% had a male householder with no spouse or partner present. 39.2% of all households were non-families. 35.2% of all households were made up of individuals, 19.3% had someone living alone who was 65 years old or older.

The median age in the city was 43.4 years. 25.5% of the residents were under the age of 20; 5.3% were between the ages of 20 and 24; 21.0% were from 25 and 44; 25.1% were from 45 and 64; and 23.2% were 65 years of age or older. The gender makeup of the city was 50.4% male and 49.6% female.

=== 2010 census ===
As of the census of 2010, there were 1,056 people, 496 households, and 309 families living in the city. The population density was 1,242.4 inhabitants per square mile (479.7/km^{2}). There were 531 housing units at an average density of 624.7 per square mile (241.2/km^{2}). The racial makeup of the city was 98.7% White, 0.8% African American, 0.1% from other races, and 0.5% from two or more races. Hispanic or Latino of any race were 1.2% of the population.

There were 496 households, of which 24.4% had children under the age of 18 living with them, 52.0% were married couples living together, 6.3% had a female householder with no husband present, 4.0% had a male householder with no wife present, and 37.7% were non-families. 35.9% of all households were made up of individuals, and 22.3% had someone living alone who was 65 years of age or older. The average household size was 2.13 and the average family size was 2.72.

The median age in the city was 48.9 years. 21.5% of residents were under the age of 18; 5.6% were between the ages of 18 and 24; 17.6% were from 25 to 44; 27.3% were from 45 to 64; and 28.2% were 65 years of age or older. The gender makeup of the city was 48.5% male and 51.5% female.

=== 2000 census ===
As of the census of 2000, there were 1,124 people, 508 households, and 322 families living in the city. The population density was 2,061.6 inhabitants per square mile (796.0/km^{2}). There were 547 housing units at an average density of 1,003.3 per square mile (387.4/km^{2}). The racial makeup of the city was 99.47% White, 0.18% Native American, 0.09% Asian, and 0.27% from two or more races. Hispanic or Latino of any race were 0.89% of the population.

There were 508 households, out of which 21.9% had children under the age of 18 living with them, 55.7% were married couples living together, 5.7% had a female householder with no husband present, and 36.6% were non-families. 34.4% of all households were made up of individuals, and 21.5% had someone living alone who was 65 years of age or older. The average household size was 2.14 and the average family size was 2.73.

In the city, the population was spread out, with 19.9% under the age of 18, 6.4% from 18 to 24, 19.3% from 25 to 44, 23.4% from 45 to 64, and 31.0% who were 65 years of age or older. The median age was 48 years. For every 100 females there were 84.6 males. For every 100 females age 18 and over, there were 80.4 males.

The median income for a household in the city was $32,188, and the median income for a family was $42,569. Males had a median income of $29,293 versus $20,833 for females. The per capita income for the city was $17,644. About 5.1% of families and 9.1% of the population were below the poverty line, including 5.6% of those under age 18 and 12.7% of those age 65 or over.

== Education ==
Paullina is served by the South O'Brien Community School District. The district was formed on July 1, 1993 by the merger of three school districts: Paullina, Primghar, and Sutherland. Paullina is home to the Junior High/High School which houses grades 7-12.

Paullina is also home to Zion-St. John Lutheran School, which formed due to the merger of St. John Lutheran School of Germantown and Zion Lutheran School of Paullina. The schools merged in 1976.

== See also ==
- List of cities in Iowa
