= Wendell E. Dunn =

Wendell Earl Dunn
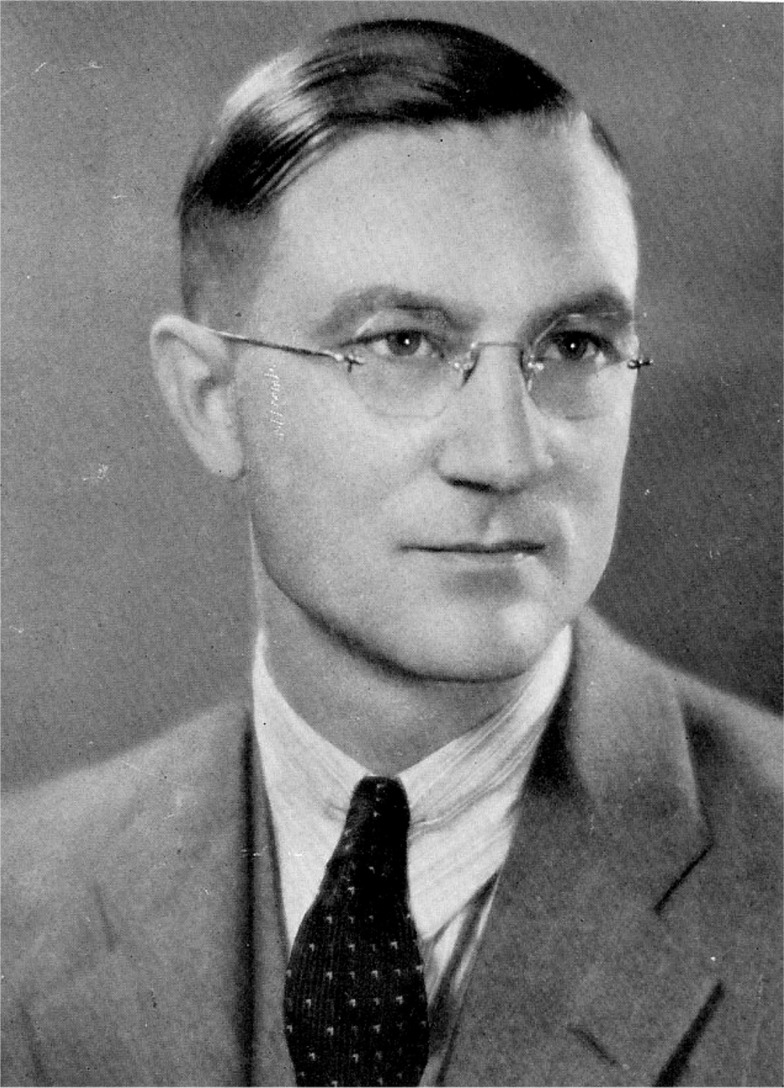
- Wendell E. Dunn
- Born: October 5, 1894; Summit, South Dakota
- Died: July 26, 1965 (aged 70); Baltimore, Maryland
- Occupation: educator
- Known for: Educational leadership
- Spouse: Edythe Hanzsche (m. 1921; died 1965)
- Children: Wendell E. Dunn, Jr. Thomas Dunn

Signature
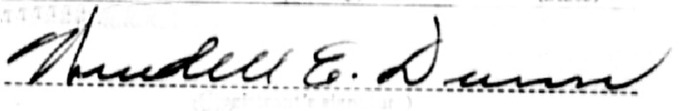

Wendell Earl Dunn, Sr. (October 5, 1894 – July 26, 1965) was a noted educator, longtime principal of Forest Park High School in Baltimore (1935–1961), and president of the Middle States Association of Colleges and Schools.

== Early years in South Dakota ==
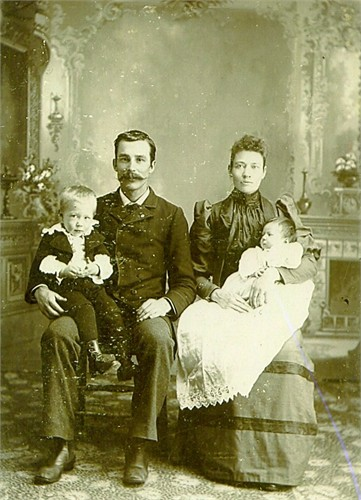
Moncena Dunn, Lois Woodward Dunn, sons Wendell (right) and Everett (left) c. 1896

Wendell Dunn was the son of Moncena and Lois Woodward Dunn. Moncena Dunn (1867–1944) was a farmer, optometrist, and inventor of the patented Dunn Ballot (fraud-proof coupon ballot). After a boyhood on a prairie homestead near Summit, South Dakota, Wendell Dunn earned an A.B. in transportation from the University of Wisconsin in 1916. He helped pay his way through college playing professional baseball as a second baseman in the Three-I League and as a cornetist and violinist in musical ensembles. He began his career in education after serving in the Army in World War I, during which time he attended officers candidate school. His first school post was as a high school science teacher in Pierre, South Dakota, from 1918 to 1919. During that time he supplemented his income by ghostwriting speeches for state legislators, sometimes penning remarks on both sides of a debate question. Dunn then served as superintendent of the Blunt, South Dakota, school district for four years before beginning a seven-year tenure as principal of the Aberdeen, South Dakota Senior High School. From 1924 to 1930 he was a professor of economics and American history at the Black Hills Teachers College in Spearfish, South Dakota. In 1927 he earned his M.A. in education from the University of Wisconsin. He moved to Baltimore in 1931. He had studied during summer 1921 at the Johns Hopkins University.

== Baltimore teaching career and later life ==
Dunn served in the Baltimore City School System for 30 of the 43 years he was an educator. The head of numerous local and regional educational groups, he was a vice principal of Baltimore City College and principal of Patterson Senior High before assuming the post at Forest Park in 1935. In 1938, he was elected president of the Maryland State Teachers' Association.

On November 25, 1955, Dunn was elected president of the Middle States Association of Colleges and Schools, the first principal of a public high school to receive this honor. He was named by educators from New York, Maryland, New Jersey, Delaware and the District of Columbia at the opening session of the organization's sixty-ninth annual convention.

Dunn died July 26, 1965, after a long illness, four days after the death of his wife. He had made a lasting impression on the lives of many of his students. One wrote,

Whatever the subject he touched upon, he seemed to go to its core. He spoke our language—with us, never down to us—raising us with his ease and flow of words to an understanding of the ethics and responsibilities that awaited us even as young adults. We are widely scattered today, but wherever we are, we hold the memory of a man who helped to give us direction, who earned the respect and esteem of his students, a mentor to thousands who stand a little straighter because of his guidance.

He was the brother of civil engineer Everett Dunn.
