= Everett Dunn =

Everett W. Dunn
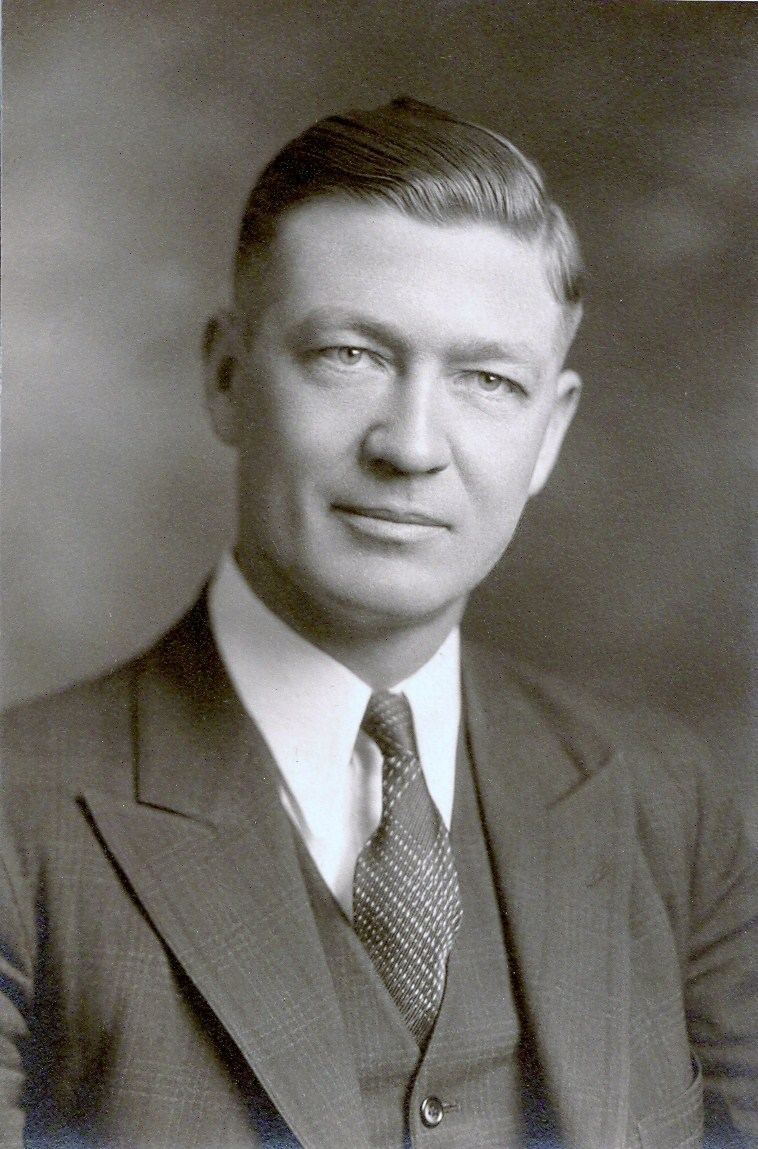
- Everett W. Dunn
- Born: August 1, 1892; Summit, South Dakota
- Died: October 3, 1980 (aged 88); Hartley, Iowa
- Occupations: civil engineer and labor negotiator
- Spouse: Dorothea Hesse (1916-1980, his death)
- Awards: Fellowship, American Society of Civil Engineers

Everett Wesley Dunn (born August 1, 1892, Summit, South Dakota, died October 3, 1980, Hartley, Iowa, age 88) was a civil engineer and labor negotiator. He was known for his work with the Iowa State Highway Commission, which demonstrated his knowledge not only of engineering but of financing as well.

== Early life ==
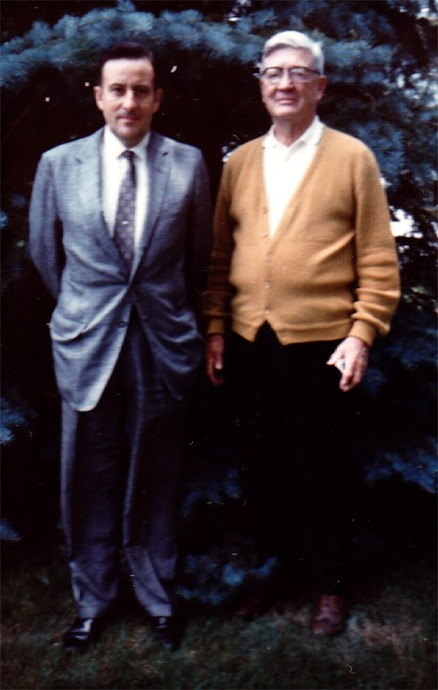
Wendell E. Dunn, Jr. (left) and Everett Dunn (right) ca 1969.

Everett Dunn was the son of Moncena and Lois Woodward Dunn. Moncena Dunn (1867–1944) was a farmer, optometrist, and inventor of the patented Dunn Ballot (fraud-proof coupon ballot). Everett Dunn was born August 1, 1892, at Summit, South Dakota. After graduating from high school in Minneapolis, he attended South Dakota State College at Brookings, South Dakota and graduated with a degree in Civil Engineering in 1913.

== Engineering career ==
Dunn was county engineer at Eldora, Iowa, for several years, then served as District Highway Engineer for the State of Iowa at Sioux City, Iowa, until 1941, when he entered private practice. Dunn was employed by, or was a consultant for, the U.S. Water Adjustment Board (1944–1946), the Industrial Stabilization Commission (1950–1952), a Portsmouth, Ohio, plutonium plant (1952–1953), and was a special consultant for the Atomic Energy Commission at the Nevada proving grounds (1964–1967). During this time Dunn gained wide recognition for his facility with labor negotiations, contractors, and government agencies.

== Family ==
Dunn was the brother of educator Wendell E. Dunn, uncle of chemical engineer Wendell E. Dunn, Jr. and musician Thomas Dunn.
