= Moncena Dunn (inventor) =

Inventor of the fraud-proof, color-coded coupon ballot

- Moncena Dunn ca 1896
- Born: October 15, 1867; Hancock, Wisconsin
- Died: July 16, 1944 (aged 76); Eau Claire, Wisconsin
- Occupations: optometrist, inventor
- Known for: coupon fraud-proof ballot
- Spouse(s): Lois Woodward (married 1891, divorced 1907); Elizabeth Weiland (1907-1938, her death)
- Children: Wendell E. Dunn, Everett Dunn, Cletus Dunn, Dorothy Dunn, Anita Dunn

Moncena Dunn (October 15, 1867 – July 16, 1944), was a farmer, telegrapher, optometrist, and inventor of the fraud-proof, color-coded coupon ballot (Dunn Ballot).

== Early years ==
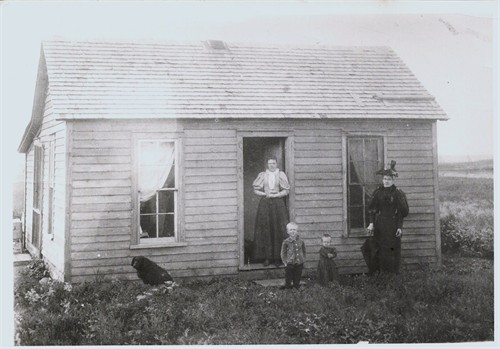
The claim of Moncena and Lois Dunn was staked on April 16, 1892, just west of Summit, South Dakota. Lois is outside in a full dress, her friend, Celia Johnson, is in the doorway. Son Everett has his hands in his pockets, son Wendell is wearing a smock

Moncena Dunn was born the son of farmer Wallace Dunn and Lucy N. Miller in Hancock, Wisconsin 15 October 1867.

Dunn married Lois Woodward in 1891 and as the station agent went to live at Summit, South Dakota, a station established on the recently built extension of the Milwaukee Road. When the Sisseton and Wahpeton Reservation was opened for settlement Moncena and Lois took up a claim adjacent to the town of Summit, built a small wooden house and here their two children, Everett and Wendell, were born. Moncena Dunn was appointed US Postmaster of Summit, 6 April 1892.

== Dunn Ballot ==
The Dunn color-coded coupon ballot was authorized as part of an act passed by the Wisconsin legislature in 1905.

In July 1914, Dunn went to Chicago, Illinois to interest civic and legislative organizations in his new color-coded coupon ballot. Dunn asserted that the ballot would put an end to all electoral fraud; that it was simple enough for any voter; that it would enable clerks and judges to count ballots four times as quickly as under the present Australian ballot system; that it would not entail the expense of the voting machine, and that voters would not be hurried as they were with the voting machines.

== Use of the Dunn Ballot ==
Moncena Dunn and Lois Woodward Dunn ca 1890

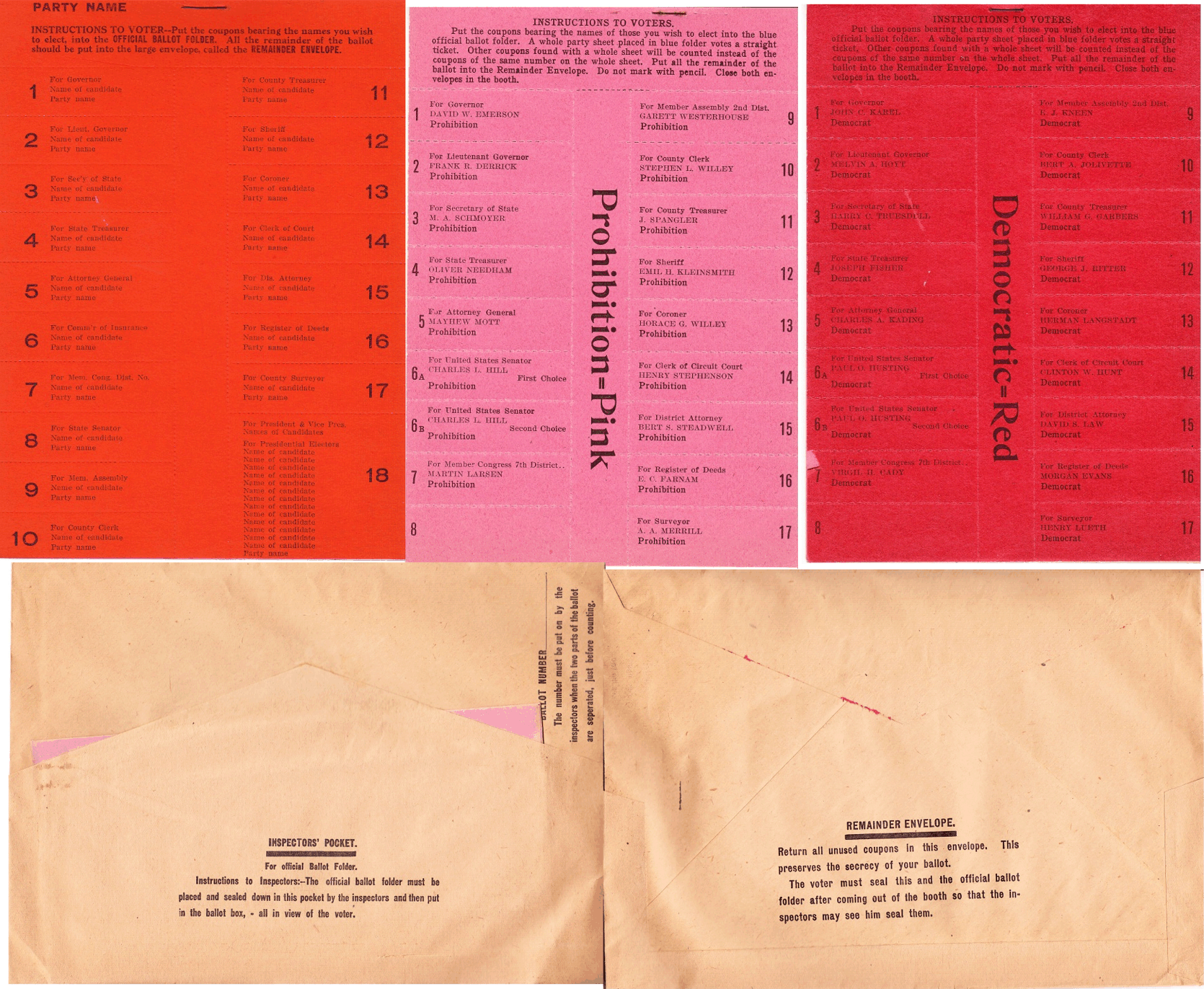
Dunn Ballot, Wisconsin, ca 1912

Under Dunn's system there was a colored card of coupons for each party. Every voter was given two envelopes with his ballot. In one he placed the coupons of the candidates he voted for. In the other he placed the remaining coupons. If a voter desired to vote a straight ticket he tore off the full page which contained the names of all the candidates of his party. When he split his ticket he tore out the coupons on which were the names of the candidates he wished to vote for. The coupons of each party were of a different color.

"Only one ballot is to be counted at a time," Dunn told the Chicago Tribune. "When the judge takes the envelopes out of the ballot box he numbers them. There is a pocket in the discard envelope to contain the smaller envelope which holds the voted coupons. The Judge takes the coupons out and reads the vote by the color and number of office, each office being numbered on the ballot. A person standing twenty feet away can tell if he reads the vote correctly. After the vote is read, the judge puts the envelopes together again. Then if any controversy over the result arises there are two records of the ballot. There are the names the voter voted for and the names to be discarded. There is never any question as to what the voter meant, as there so frequently is with the present ballot in general use. There is absolutely no chance for short pencil work. If there are any errors, they are easily caught. We consider, in counting, only the names voted for. With the present ballot we consider all the candidates of every party. Experiment has shown that the ballots can be counted four times as fast as at present."

== Reception of the Dunn Ballot ==
Dunn held a conference with C. E. DePuy of Lewis Institute, who demonstrated the possibilities of fraud in the voting machines purchased for Chicago, "This appears to me the most feasible style of ballot I have ever seen," DePuy said. "It remedies many of the faults of the present system, and I do not see why it should not gain the universal approval of honest voters."

== Final years ==
Dunn spent his last years working as an optometrist in Eau Claire, Wisconsin. He is buried in Gate of Heaven Cemetery, Marshfield, Wood County, Wisconsin, US.

== Family ==
Son Wendell E. Dunn was a noted educator, son Everett Dunn was a civil engineer and labor negotiatior, daughter Anita Elizabeth Dunn (1913–1990) was Supervisor of English, Milne School, New York State College for Teachers, Albany, Associate Professor of Education, State University of New York at Albany, and co-author of a popular school reader. Son Cletus Moncena Dunn (1912–2010) was a radio engineer who directed the construction of an underground concrete chamber that simulated the radio room of a sub. "Dunn's Dungeon," the chamber's nickname, was a test site for the antenna system and communication system for USS Seawolf (SSN-575), the first integrated radio sub and the second atomic sub ever built.
