= Hartley, Iowa =

City in Iowa, United States

- City
- Motto: The City with a Heart
- Location of Hartley, Iowa
- Coordinates: 43°10′45″N 95°28′36″W
- Country: USA
- State: Iowa
- County: O'Brien

Government
  - Type: Mayor-council

Area
  - Total: 1.33 sq mi (3.44 km^{2})
  - Land: 1.33 sq mi (3.44 km^{2})
  - Water: 0 sq mi (0.00 km^{2})
- Elevation: 1,467 ft (447 m)

Population (2020)
  - Total: 1,605
  - Density: 1,207/sq mi (465.9/km^{2})
- Time zone: UTC−6 (Central (CST))
  - Summer (DST): UTC−5 (CDT)
- ZIP Code: 51346
- Area code: 712
- FIPS code: 19-34725
- GNIS feature ID: 2394312
- Website: City of Hartley

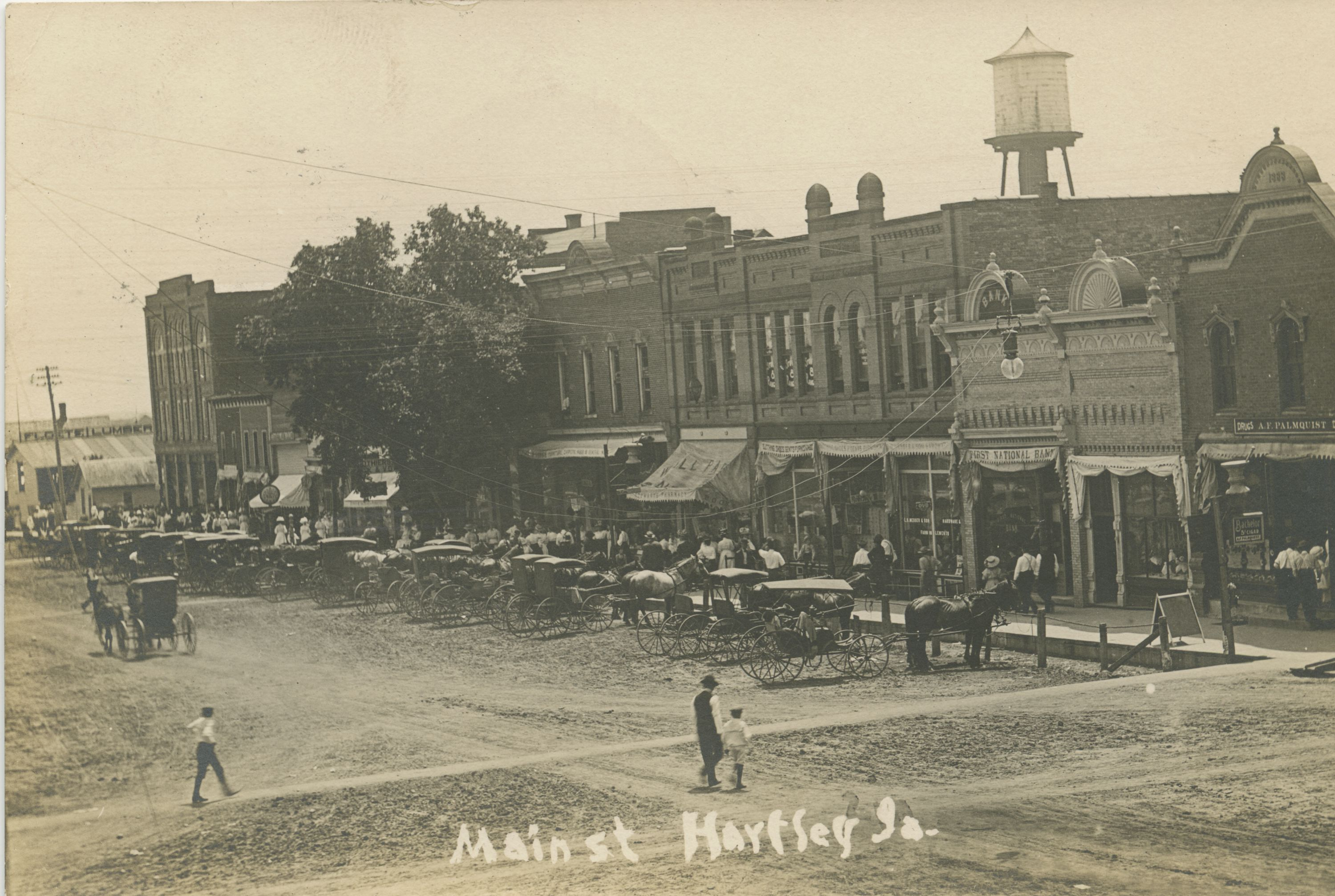
Main Street, Hartley, Iowa 1900

Hartley is a city in O'Brien County, Iowa, United States. The population was 1,605 in the 2020 census.

== History ==
Hartley got its start around 1880, following construction of the Chicago, Milwaukee & St. Paul Railway through that territory. Hartley was named for a railroad official John Hartley.

== Geography ==
According to the United States Census Bureau, the city has a total area of 1.30 square miles (3.37 km^{2}), all land.

=== Major highways ===
- U.S. Route 18

== Demographics ==
Historical population
Census	Pop.	Note	%±
1890	519		—
1900	1,006		93.8%
1910	1,106		9.9%
1920	1,306		18.1%
1930	1,272		−2.6%
1940	1,503		18.2%
1950	1,611		7.2%
1960	1,738		7.9%
1970	1,694		−2.5%
1980	1,700		0.4%
1990	1,632		−4.0%
2000	1,733		6.2%
2010	1,672		−3.5%
2020	1,605		−4.0%
U.S. Decennial Census

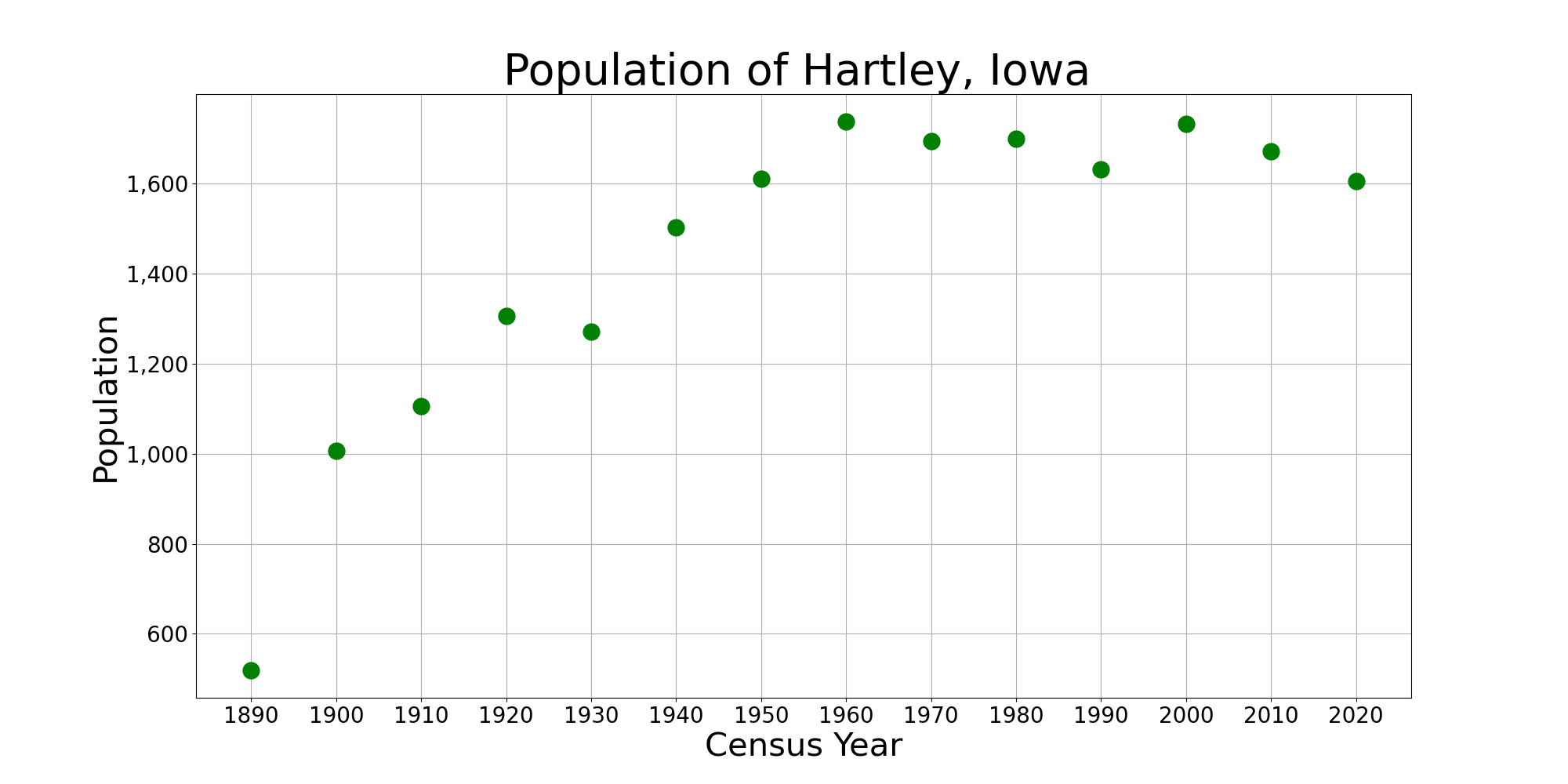
The population of Hartley, Iowa, from US census data

=== 2020 census ===
As of the 2020 census, there were 1,605 people, 679 households, and 420 families residing in the city. The median age was 44.4 years. 21.7% of residents were under the age of 18 and 25.2% were 65 years of age or older. 23.9% of residents were under the age of 20; 4.4% were between the ages of 20 and 24; 22.6% were from 25 to 44; and 23.9% were from 45 to 64. For every 100 females, there were 95.3 males, and for every 100 females age 18 and over, there were 91.3 males age 18 and over. The gender makeup of the city was 48.8% male and 51.2% female. The population density was 1,206.7 inhabitants per square mile (465.9/km^{2}).

Of the 679 households, 25.3% had children under the age of 18 living with them, 48.7% were married-couple households, 7.5% were cohabitating couples, 24.7% had a female householder with no spouse or partner present, and 19.0% had a male householder with no spouse or partner present. 38.1% of all households were non-families. 33.0% of all households were made up of individuals, and 15.3% had someone living alone who was 65 years old or older.

There were 754 housing units at an average density of 566.9 per square mile (218.9/km^{2}). Of all housing units, 9.9% were vacant. The homeowner vacancy rate was 1.5% and the rental vacancy rate was 14.1%.

0.0% of residents lived in urban areas, while 100.0% lived in rural areas.

Racial composition as of the 2020 census
Race	Number	Percent
White	1,429	89.0%
Black or African American	24	1.5%
American Indian and Alaska Native	4	0.2%
Asian	5	0.3%
Native Hawaiian and Other Pacific Islander	0	0.0%
Some other race	39	2.4%
Two or more races	104	6.5%
Hispanic or Latino (of any race)	136	8.5%

=== 2010 census ===
As of the census of 2010, there were 1,672 people, 713 households, and 444 families living in the city. The population density was 1,290/sq mi (497/km^{2}). There were 789 housing units at an average density of 607 per square mile (239/km^{2}). The racial makeup of the city was 95.8% White, 0.4% Asian, 0.1% American Indian, 1.7% from other races, and 2.0% from two or more races. The city has a 4.4% Hispanic or Latino background.

There were 713 households, of which 26.8% had children under the age of 18 living with them, 49.8% were married couples living together, 8.6% had a female householder with no husband present, 3.9% had a male householder with no wife present, and 37.7% were non-families. Of all households, 33.8% were made up of individuals living alone, and 33.5% had someone living alone who was 65 years of age or older. The average household size was 2.26 and the average family size was 2.89.

26.0% were under the age of 20, 4.4% from 20 to 24, 20.2% from 25 to 44, 27.3% from 45 to 64, and 22.1% were 65 years of age or older. The median age was 44.3 years. For every 100 females, there were 91.3 males.

The median income for a household in the city was $40,795, and the median income for a family was $49,286. The per capita income for the city was $19,999. About 11.8% of families and 19.7% of the population were below the poverty line, including 41.1% of those under age 18 and 18.6% of those age 65 or over.

=== 2000 census ===
As of the census of 2000, there were 1,733 people, 726 households, and 461 families living in the city. The population density was 1,333.1 inhabitants per square mile (514.7/km^{2}). There were 803 housing units at an average density of 629.3 per square mile (243.0/km^{2}). The racial makeup of the city was 96.8% White, 0.8% African American, 0.1% Native American, 0.4% Asian, 0.9% from other races, and 1% from two or more races. Hispanic or Latino of any race were 4.7% of the population.

There were 726 households, out of which 29.3% had children under the age of 18 living with them, 53.6% were married couples living together, 6.9% had a female householder with no husband present, and 36.5% were non-families. Of all households, 32.6% were made up of individuals, and 18.9% had someone living alone who was 65 years of age or older. The average household size was 2.3 and the average family size was 2.3.

Of the population, 25.2% were under the age of 18, 5.9% from 18 to 24, 26.4% from 25 to 44, 18.5% from 45 to 64, and 24% 65 years of age or older. The median age was 40.1 years. For every 100 females, there were 88.8 males. For every 100 females age 18 and over, there were 84.0 males.

== Arts and culture ==
=== Annual cultural events ===
Hartley celebrates Summerfest every year during the first weekend in August.

== Parks and recreation ==
=== Golf ===
Meadowbrook Golf & Country Club is a public 9-hole golf club located 3.5 miles (5.6 km) south of Hartley on M12. It was named Iowa's 2003 9-Hole Course of the Year.

The city also has two local parks: Neebel, which has a newly built public swimming pool and Shinkle.

== Education ==
Hartley is served by the Hartley–Melvin–Sanborn Community School District, which formed on July 1, 1991, with the merger of the Hartley–Melvin and Sanborn districts. The predecessor Hartley–Melvin district formed on July 1, 1981, through the merger of the Hartley and Melvin districts.

Hartley is home to both the Hartley–Melvin–Sanborn Elementary School and the Hartley–Melvin–Sanborn High School.

== Religion ==
Covey Church, built in 1874, is the oldest church building in O'Brien County.

== Olhausen Pool Hall ==
Hartley was the home of the Olhausen Pool Hall, which was the origin of the Olhausen Billiard Company of San Diego.

== Notable people ==
- Everett Dunn (1892–1980), civil engineer and labor negotiator
- Jim Fanning (1927–2015), Major League Baseball catcher, manager and general manager
- Wesley Leonard "Cowboy" Fry (1902–1970), football player, coach of football and baseball
- Bonnie Linder (1927–2020), subject of a viral video
- Vicki Myron (born 1947), author of Dewey: The Small-Town Library Cat Who Touched the World
- Maurice Pate (1894–1965), co-founded United Nations Children's Fund (UNICEF) in 1947
