= Wendell E. Dunn Jr. =

American chemical engineer (1922–2007)

Wendell Earl Dunn Jr.
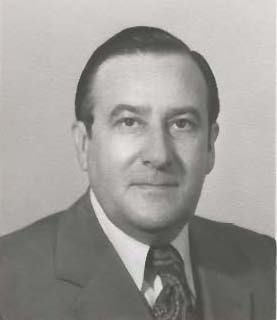
- Wendell E. Dunn Jr.
- Born: August 30, 1922; Baltimore, Maryland, United States
- Died: December 24, 2007 (aged 85); Tucson, Arizona, United States
- Occupations: Chemical Engineer, Inventor
- Known for: technologies for high temperature chlorination, gold extraction, tantalum extraction and titanium extraction
- Spouse(s): Lillian D. Dunn, married 1944–1992 (her death)

Wendell Earl Dunn Jr. (August 30, 1922 – December 24, 2007) was an American chemical engineer, metallurgist, and inventor. His technologies for high temperature chlorination, gold, tantalum and titanium extraction are still widely used.

== Early years ==
Dunn was the first son of educator Wendell E. Dunn, for many years principal of Forest Park High School in Baltimore, and brother of conductor Thomas Dunn. A graduate of Baltimore City College and Johns Hopkins University, Dunn was also awarded a doctorate in chemical engineering from Johns Hopkins. After completing the Harvard/MIT V-12 program in 1944, he was engaged in aircraft terrain avoidance radar research in both the U.S. and occupied Germany. Dunn served as captain in the U.S. Army Air Corps until 1946.

== Chemical research ==
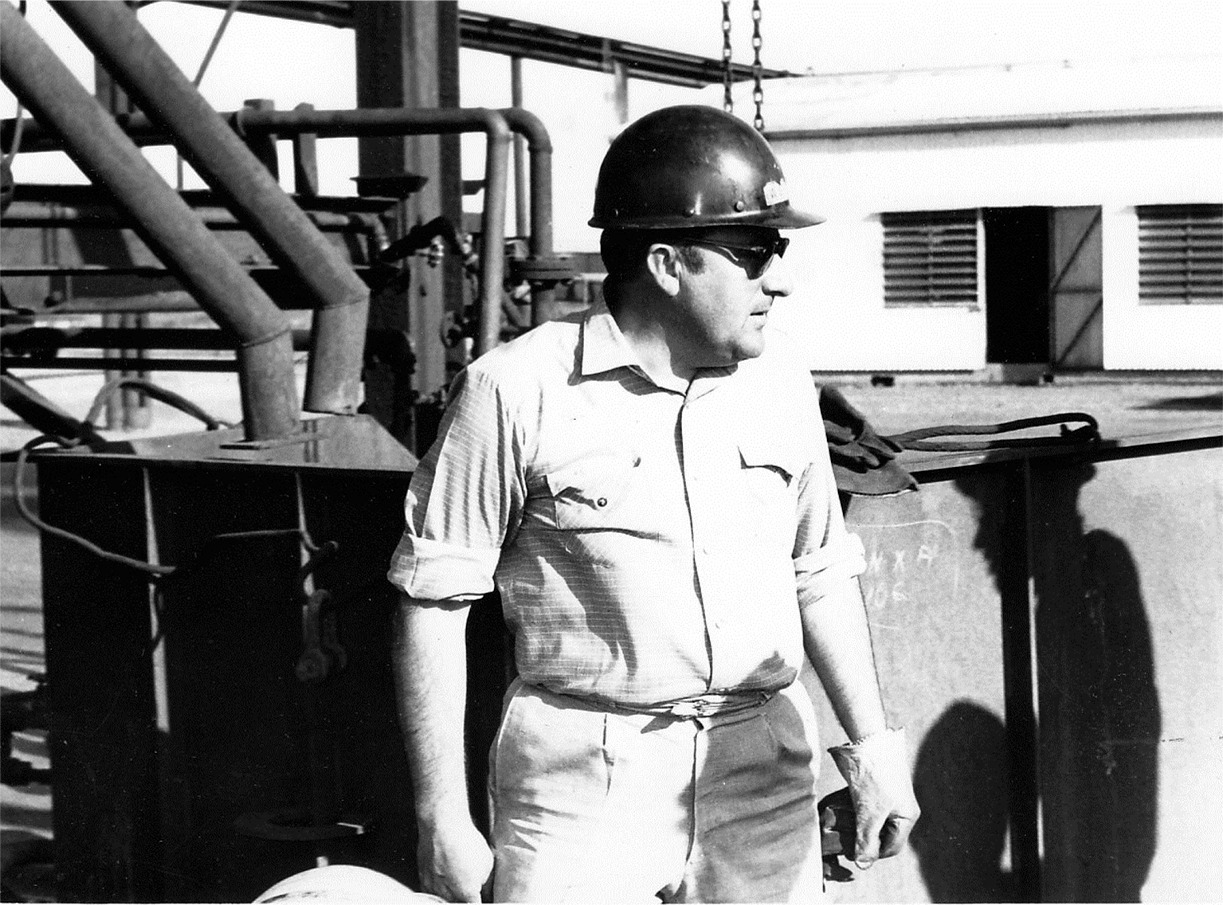
Wendell Dunn at pilot plant for producing low-cost titanium process feedstock, Mount Morgan, Queensland, Australia, ca 1975.

In 1950 Dunn was a key member of the research and development team at E.I. DuPont de Nemours in Wilmington, Delaware which developed an improved process for the production of high-purity titanium dioxide for use as a paint pigment. He filed his first sole-inventor U.S. patent in 1954. He remained with the firm for 19 years during which time this process grew to become the dominant technology worldwide.

In 1968 Dunn left DuPont to form his own contract research and development firm in Delaware and Sydney, Australia. He worked closely for several years with a major Australian mining house, Peko-Wallsend, to develop a technology to produce a low-cost titanium process feedstock. Thereafter, Dunn returned to South Dakota and for the next three decades made significant contributions to the field of high-temperature chlorination of metal ores.

Between 1975 and 1995 Dunn consulted to international corporations Reynolds Metals, Kerr-McGee and DuPont, among others and performed R&D which formed the bases for several start-up ventures in South Dakota and beyond. He worked with the Lien Brothers and others in the Rapid City area to develop processes for the extraction of ultra-pure niobium from ore, and tantalum metals for use in electronic applications, and for the efficient separation and recovery of gold from low-grade ore and scrap.

From the late-1980s until the late-1990s Dunn joined with European and Asian interests to develop a process for low-cost titanium-based pigments, and worked in India for months at a time. He was an adjunct faculty member in metallurgy at the South Dakota School of Mines and Technology, and was working on a patent application at the time of his death.

Dunn had a whimsical side, and in 1979 penned a political satire, The Sex Tax. Dunn is interred in Green Mount Cemetery in Baltimore. He was the nephew of civil engineer Everett Dunn.
