= Thomas Dunn (musician) =

American musician and music editor

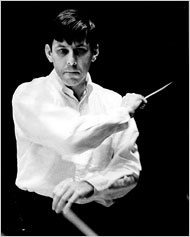
- Thomas Dunn, 1979
- Born: December 21, 1925; Aberdeen, South Dakota, U.S.
- Died: October 26, 2008 (aged 82); Bloomington, Indiana, U.S.
- Resting place: Green Mount Cemetery; Baltimore, Maryland, U.S.
- Occupations: Musician, conductor
- Known for: Contribution to early music revival

Thomas Burt Dunn (December 21, 1925 – October 26, 2008) was an American musician, conductor and music editor known for his performances of Baroque music. He is considered an important figure in the development of the 20th-century early music revival and adoption of historically informed performance practices in the United States.

== Early years ==
Dunn was born in Aberdeen, South Dakota, on December 21, 1925, and raised in Baltimore, Maryland, the son of educator Wendell E. Dunn and younger brother of chemical engineer-inventor Wendell E. Dunn, Jr. He was also the nephew of civil engineer Everett Dunn. He loved music as a child and at about age 11 he was named assistant organist of a Baltimore church. At 16 he became the organist of another local church and was named director of its professional choir not long afterward.

He studied at Johns Hopkins University and in 1946 received his bachelor's degree from the Peabody Conservatory, where he studied organ with Virgil Fox and E. Power Biggs. He earned a master's degree at Harvard University in 1948, and then studied at the Amsterdam Conservatory. His harpsichord teachers were Charles Courboin, Ernest White, and Gustav Leonhardt. He studied conducting with Robert Shaw, G. Wallace Woodworth, William Ifor Jones, and Anthon van der Horst.

== Musical career ==
In the 1950s he was a music director for several churches in Baltimore, Philadelphia, and in 1957 moved to New York City to become music director at the Church of the Incarnation. In 1959, he succeeded Arthur Mendel and Alfred Mann as director of New York's Cantata Singers. He expanded the group's repertoire to include 19th and 20th-century works, but gained notice for presentations rarities from its traditional repertoire, especially Handel's Belshazzar and Rameau's Les Indes galantes. Harold Schonberg assessed a 1959 concert of works by Purcell and Britten with these words:

In Mr. Dunn the Cantata Singers have an alert, exciting conductor whose rhythm is impeccable and who has immediate control over his forces. He has trained his singers splendidly, and he is one of the few choral conductors who seems to have an idea of what an orchestra is about.

Also in 1959, he launched the ten-year career of the Festival Orchestra of New York. With that group in 1964 he led the New York premiere of Haydn's C Major Cello Concerto, a work discovered in 1961, with Janos Starker. He gained a wider reputation with a series of concerts of works by Bach and Handel at Carnegie Hall in 1961–2. In 1963, he presented Handel's Messiah four times in four different editions, further enhancing his reputation as a conductor of Baroque music. In 1963 Time magazine described him as "The hero of the baroqueniks." In 1966, he conducted the Naumburg Orchestral Concerts, in the Naumburg Bandshell, Central Park, in the summer series.

Dunn appeared as an imposter on the January 31, 1966 episode of the CBS game show To Tell the Truth. He revealed his true identity at the end of the segment.

This led to his appointment in 1967 as music director of the Handel and Haydn Society of Boston, a post he held until 1986. During his tenure there, he transformed the organization from a traditional amateur oratorio society to a fully professional ensemble with a repertoire that ranged from early music to modern works. Michael Steinberg described his work: "His performances are clean, transparent, rhythmic and, in a broad repertory from Schütz to Dallapiccola and Stravinsky, he is particularly effective in works with chorus." The New York Times said that his work "helped animate the early music revival that took place in the mid-20th century and afterward". His ensembles used modern instruments but comprised fewer players; the ensembles' "clean, spare sound harked back to 17th- and 18th-century models".

== Published works and later life ==
Many of his editions of choral music were published by E.C. Schirmer in Boston, where he was Editor-in-Chief in the 1970s. He held several faculty appointments at music schools in the U.S., including Boston University, Stanford University, and finally from 1990 to 1999 at the Indiana University School of Music. After his retirement, he devoted himself to writing and mentoring younger conductors. He composed works suitable for small church choirs, described by their publisher, Cantate Music Press, as "adaptable to the exigencies and emergencies that are apt to befall Sunday mornings." He died of heart failure on October 26, 2008, in Bloomington, Indiana. He was buried in Green Mount Cemetery.

== See also ==
- Hall, Tom (October 2001), "Thomas Dunn at 75: reflections on a varied career" (PDF), Choral Journal, 42: 23–32
