= Covey Church =

Historic church in O'Brien County, Iowa, United States

- Location within Iowa Location within the United States
- 43.06892°N 95.48751°W
- Location: between Hartley and Sutherland, Iowa

Architecture
- Completed: 1874 (152 years ago)

Covey Church, formerly Covey Methodist Church, is a historic church in rural Iowa, United States. Built in 1874, it was the first wooden frame church in O'Brien County. It is now the county's oldest church building. It stands at the northwestern intersection of 400th Street and Vine Avenue, around the midpoint between the cities of Hartley, 8 miles (13 km) to the north, and Sutherland, 7 miles (11 km) to the south.

The church was built in 1874 as the First Congregational Church by Reverend John Henry Covey, who arrived in the county three years earlier. It was dedicated, on land donated by John Loder, in October of that year. Lucy Slack, also known as Mother Slack, helped Covey establish the Congregational church and was a force in its reorganization in 1880. She and her husband, William, lived on a homestead about 1 mile (1.6 km) north of the church. After a thirty-year marriage, William died, aged 56, the year the church was completed, and at one point his widow was the church's sole member. When farmers returned who had earlier moved away due to crop destruction from pest and drought, they motioned to disband the church and established a new congregation. Slack fought back, saying, "There is a church here now. I am it." Thirteen people formed the new membership.

A tornado flattened the building in 1882, but Slack arranged its reconstruction by raising $10.48 and finding volunteers to undertake the work. The post-reconstruction church was dedicated in 1884, headed by a new pastor.

In 1909, the Methodist minister from Hartley and one from Everly began holding services at the church, with the congregation purchasing the building five years later. The congregation remained there until 1959. The building was renovated in 1966 and 1992.

The church's organ was donated by a woman from Sheldon, Iowa.

Relatives of John Henry Covey, who left Iowa for Kansas in 1876, held family reunions at the church, the last one being in 2018. Worships are held at the church once annually, on the Sunday following Labor Day.

A small burial ground, Grant Cemetery (also known as Covey Church Cemetery), stands across 400th Street from the church. Among the burials there are the Slacks, Lucy having died in 1905, aged 80.

== See also ==
- History of Methodism in the United States
