= Bonnie Linder =

American internet sensation (1927–2020)

- Linder around 2020
- Born: Lavonne Joan Harms; March 15, 1927; Sheldon, Iowa, U.S.
- Died: November 19, 2020 (aged 93); Hartley, Iowa, U.S.

Lavonne Joan "Bonnie" Linder (March 15, 1927 – November 19, 2020) was a resident of Hartley, Iowa, who was the subject of a viral video in 2020. Her fame began after her daughter, Judy Zimmerman, posted a video of Linder waving to children on a school bus after they had arranged to stop in front of her house to wish her a happy birthday. The event occurred on March 13, two days before her 93rd birthday.

== Early life ==
Lavonne Joan Harms was born in 1927, in Sheldon, Iowa, to Henry L. and Lillian Minnie Harms. She attended Archer Consolidated School, in Archer, Iowa, and graduated in 1944.

== Viral video ==
In March 2020, Linder's daughter, Judy Zimmerman, arranged to have a bus from a local school stop in front of her house, in Hartley, Iowa, and to have the children on board wish Linder a happy birthday. Since the beginning of the school year, Linder had either waved from the window of her home, or, in favorable weather, stood on her porch every weekday morning to wave to the bus as it passed by, becoming known as "Grandma on the Farm". The bus driver would honk in response; as such, the driver wanted to do something to mark her birthday.

Linder's routine of waving to the bus was substantially interrupted shortly afterwards, as a result of the COVID-19 pandemic, which resulted in schools in the Hartley–Melvin–Sanborn Community School District closing, but she was able to greet the mail person and the driver of the cattle-feed delivery wagon, as she had been doing.

== Personal life ==
After attaining a two-year teaching certificate from Morningside College, Harms began teaching second grade in Sutherland, Iowa. While in Sutherland, she met Paul Linder (1923–1985), whom she married in 1951. She enrolled at Iowa State University, in Ames, Iowa, until her husband's graduation in June 1952. They lived on Linder's family farm on 310th Street, one mile north of downtown Hartley, Iowa.

The family moved to Kankakee, Illinois, between 1959 and 1962. Linder played the church organ for two years of the three, and continued the role for over sixty years at Hartley Methodist Church after their return to the farm.

She was a member of the Order of the Eastern Star for over fifty years.

== Death ==
Linder died at her home in November 2020, aged 93, eight months after the viral video was released.
