= Summit, South Dakota =

- Town
- Location in Roberts County and the state of South Dakota
- Coordinates: 45°18′20″N 97°02′21″W
- Country: United States
- State: South Dakota
- County: Roberts
- Incorporated: 1897

Area
  - Total: 0.55 sq mi (1.42 km^{2})
  - Land: 0.55 sq mi (1.42 km^{2})
  - Water: 0 sq mi (0.00 km^{2})
- Elevation: 2,015 ft (614 m)

Population (2020)
  - Total: 288
  - Density: 525.7/sq mi (202.97/km^{2})
- Time zone: UTC-6 (Central (CST))
  - Summer (DST): UTC-5 (CDT)
- ZIP code: 57266
- Area code: 605
- FIPS code: 46-62220
- GNIS feature ID: 1267597
- Website: www.seesummitsd.com

Summit is a town in Roberts County, South Dakota, United States. The population was 288 at the 2020 census.

== History ==
Summit was laid out in 1892, and was so named on account of the town site's lofty elevation.

== Geography ==
According to the United States Census Bureau, the town has a total area of 0.56 square miles (1.45 km^{2}), all land.

=== Climate ===
Summit has a warm-summer humid continental climate (Dfb) according to the Köppen–Geiger climate classification system and a temperate continental climate (Dc) according to the Trewartha climate classification system, with (as its classification indicates) warm, rainy summers and generally sub-freezing, dry winters.

Climate data for Summit 1 W, South Dakota (1991−2020 normals, extremes 1956−present)
Month	Jan	Feb	Mar	Apr	May	Jun	Jul	Aug	Sep	Oct	Nov	Dec	Year
Record high °F (°C)	64 (18)	62 (17)	81 (27)	94 (34)	95 (35)	103 (39)	103 (39)	102 (39)	97 (36)	88 (31)	76 (24)	57 (14)	103 (39)
Mean daily maximum °F (°C)	20.7 (−6.3)	25.7 (−3.5)	38.7 (3.7)	54.6 (12.6)	68.2 (20.1)	77.1 (25.1)	81.9 (27.7)	80.4 (26.9)	73.0 (22.8)	57.5 (14.2)	39.8 (4.3)	25.7 (−3.5)	53.6 (12.0)
Daily mean °F (°C)	11.4 (−11.4)	15.9 (−8.9)	28.5 (−1.9)	42.5 (5.8)	55.5 (13.1)	65.3 (18.5)	70.0 (21.1)	68.3 (20.2)	60.5 (15.8)	45.9 (7.7)	30.3 (−0.9)	17.2 (−8.2)	42.6 (5.9)
Mean daily minimum °F (°C)	2.1 (−16.6)	6.1 (−14.4)	18.4 (−7.6)	30.3 (−0.9)	42.8 (6.0)	53.5 (11.9)	58.1 (14.5)	56.3 (13.5)	47.9 (8.8)	34.4 (1.3)	20.7 (−6.3)	8.6 (−13.0)	31.6 (−0.2)
Record low °F (°C)	−38 (−39)	−40 (−40)	−26 (−32)	−7 (−22)	15 (−9)	30 (−1)	38 (3)	32 (0)	15 (−9)	4 (−16)	−25 (−32)	−34 (−37)	−40 (−40)
Average precipitation inches (mm)	0.65 (17)	0.69 (18)	1.03 (26)	2.34 (59)	3.16 (80)	3.95 (100)	4.07 (103)	2.97 (75)	2.77 (70)	2.51 (64)	0.90 (23)	0.66 (17)	25.70 (653)
Average snowfall inches (cm)	10.2 (26)	12.4 (31)	8.8 (22)	7.8 (20)	0.1 (0.25)	0.0 (0.0)	0.0 (0.0)	0.0 (0.0)	0.0 (0.0)	2.0 (5.1)	5.4 (14)	11.9 (30)	58.6 (149)
Average precipitation days (≥ 0.01 in)	6.3	5.8	5.9	7.5	10.7	11.2	9.1	8.5	8.2	7.8	5.1	6.7	92.8
Average snowy days (≥ 0.1 in)	5.2	4.8	3.2	2.2	0.1	0.0	0.0	0.0	0.0	0.8	2.8	5.2	24.3
Source: NOAA

== Demographics ==
Historical population
Census	Pop.	Note	%±
1900	237		—
1910	545		130.0%
1920	556		2.0%
1930	431		−22.5%
1940	459		6.5%
1950	431		−6.1%
1960	283		−34.3%
1970	332		17.3%
1980	290		−12.7%
1990	267		−7.9%
2000	281		5.2%
2010	288		2.5%
2020	288		0.0%
U.S. Decennial Census

=== 2010 census ===
As of the census of 2010, there were 288 people, 112 households, and 69 families residing in the town. The population density was 514.3 inhabitants per square mile (198.6/km^{2}). There were 129 housing units at an average density of 230.4 per square mile (89.0/km^{2}). The racial makeup of the town was 63.5% White, 0.3% African American, 29.2% Native American, 0.3% Asian, and 6.6% from two or more races. Hispanic or Latino of any race were 1.0% of the population.

There were 112 households, of which 42.9% had children under the age of 18 living with them, 40.2% were married couples living together, 10.7% had a female householder with no husband present, 10.7% had a male householder with no wife present, and 38.4% were non-families. 33.0% of all households were made up of individuals, and 9% had someone living alone who was 65 years of age or older. The average household size was 2.57 and the average family size was 3.32.

The median age in the town was 32.5 years. 35.4% of residents were under the age of 18; 6.6% were between the ages of 18 and 24; 25% were from 25 to 44; 23.3% were from 45 to 64; and 9.7% were 65 years of age or older. The gender makeup of the town was 53.1% male and 46.9% female.

=== 2000 census ===
As of the census of 2000, there were 281 people, 119 households, and 74 families residing in the town. The population density was 747.2 inhabitants per square mile (288.5/km^{2}). There were 144 housing units at an average density of 382.9 per square mile (147.8/km^{2}). The racial makeup of the town was 83.63% White, 14.23% Native American, and 2.14% from two or more races.

There were 119 households, out of which 31.1% had children under the age of 18 living with them, 44.5% were married couples living together, 13.4% had a female householder with no husband present, and 37.0% were non-families. 31.9% of all households were made up of individuals, and 16.8% had someone living alone who was 65 years of age or older. The average household size was 2.36 and the average family size was 3.01.

In the town, the population was spread out, with 30.6% under the age of 18, 6.8% from 18 to 24, 24.6% from 25 to 44, 18.5% from 45 to 64, and 19.6% who were 65 years of age or older. The median age was 36 years. For every 100 females, there were 97.9 males. For every 100 females age 18 and over, there were 91.2 males.

The median income for a household in the town was $18,875, and the median income for a family was $23,125. Males had a median income of $28,750 versus $17,750 for females. The per capita income for the town was $9,339. About 28.2% of families and 34.9% of the population were below the poverty line, including 37.9% of those under the age of eighteen and 50.9% of those 65 or over.

== Religion ==
Saint John's Lutheran Church is a Christian church of the Wisconsin Evangelical Lutheran Synod in Summit.

== Transportation ==
Intercity bus service to the town is provided by Jefferson Lines.
