= Iowa's 10th Senate district =

American legislative district

Iowa's 10th State Senate district
Senator
Dan Dawson; R

The 10th District of the Iowa Senate is located in Western Iowa, and is currently composed of the cities of Council Bluffs and Carter Lake in Pottawattamie County.

== Current elected officials ==
Dan Dawson is the senator currently representing the 10th District.

The area of the 10th District contains two Iowa House of Representatives:

- The 19th District (represented by Brent Siegrist)
- The 20th District (represented by Josh Turek)

The district is also located in Iowa's 4th congressional district, which is represented by U.S. Representative Randy Feenstra.

== List of representatives ==
Representative	Party	Dates	Residence	Notes
Richard Harbour	Democrat	1846-1849	Mahaska County	
Joseph Lowe	Democrat	1851-1851	Keokuk County	
Hadley Johnson	Democrat	1852-1853	Council Bluffs, Iowa	
James Test	Democrat	1854-1855	Council Bluffs, Iowa	
John Warner	Democrat	1856-1859	Decatur County	
James F. Wilson	Republican	1860-1861	Fairfield, Iowa	Wilson was elected to the US House of Representatives for Iowa's 1st congressional district in 1861.
Joshua Shaffer	Republican	1862-1863	Jefferson County	
Theron Woolson	Republican	1864-1867	Henry County	
Charles Matthies	Republican	1868	Burlington, Iowa	Senator Matthies died in office in 1868.
Charles Beardsley	Republican	1870-1873	Burlington, Iowa	
John Williams	Republican	1874-1877	Des Moines County	
John Woolson	Republican	1878-1881	Mount Pleasant, Iowa	
Lot Abraham	Republican	1882-1885	Mount Pleasant, Iowa	
John Woolson	Republican	1886-1891	Mount Pleasant, Iowa	
David Palmer	Republican	1892-1899	Washington, Iowa	
Amos Alberson	Democrat	1900-1901	Washington, Iowa	
John Alex Young	Republican	1902-1906	Washington, Iowa	
William Seeley	Republican	1907-1910	Mount Pleasant, Iowa	
Samuel Neal	Republican	1911-1914	Washington, Iowa	
John Lindly	Democrat	1915-1918	Winfield, Iowa	
James Brookhart	Republican	1919-1926	Washington, Iowa	Senator Brookhart died in office in 1926.
William Carden	Republican	1927-1934	Henry County	
Arthur C. Dewey	Republican	1935-1942	Washington, Iowa	
Harlan Foster	Republican	1943-1950	Henry County	
Carl Anderson	Republican	1951-1958	Washington County	
Clifford Vance	Republican	1959-1962	Mount Pleasant, Iowa	
Richard Stephens	Republican	1963-1966	Ainsworth, Iowa	
Bass Van Gilst	Democrat	1967-1970	Mahaska	
Ralph Potter	Republican	1971-1972	Linn County	
Mike Blouin	Democrat	1973-1974	Dubuque County	
Robert Carr	Democrat	1974-1982	Dubuque County	
Alvin V. Miller	Democrat	1983-1992	Cerro Gordo County	
Merlin Bartz	Republican	1993-2001	Worth County	Senator Bartz resigned in 2001 to take a position in the US Department of Agriculture.
Amanda Ragan	Democrat	2002	Cerro Gordo County	
Donald Redfern	Republican	2003-2004	Black Hawk County	
Jeff Danielson	Democrat	2005-2012	Black Hawk County	
Jake Chapman	Republican	2013-2022	Adel, Iowa	
Dan Dawson	Republican	2023-Present	Council Bluffs, Iowa	

== Historical district boundaries ==
Map	Description	Years effective	Notes
	Keokuk County Mahaska County	1846-1849	From 1846 to 1857, district numbering was not utilized by the Iowa State Legislature. This convention was added with the passing of the 1857 Iowa Constitution. Numbering of districts pre-1857 is done as a matter of historic convenience.
	Keokuk County Mahaska County; Poweshiek County	1850-1851	
	Pottawattamie County	1852-1855	
	Appanoose County Decatur County; Wayne County	1856-1859	
	Jefferson County	1860-1863	
	Henry County	1864-1867	
	Des Moines County	1868-1877	
	Henry County	1878-1883	
	Henry County Jefferson County	1884-1887	
	Henry County Washington County	1888-1962	
	Louisa County Washington County	1963-1966	
	Keokuk County Mahaska County	1967-1970	
	Buchanan County Delaware County (partial); Linn County (partial)	1971-1972	In 1970, the Iowa Legislature passed an amendment to the Iowa Constitution setting forth the rules for legislative redistricting in order to abide by the rules established by the Reynolds v. Sims Supreme Court case. The first reapportionment map created by the Republican controlled legislature was deemed unconstitutional, but was still used for the 1970 election.
	Dubuque County (partial): Dubuque	1973-1982	
	Cerro Gordo County (partial) Winnebago County (partial); Worth County	1983-1992	
	Cerro Gordo County Mitchell County (partial); Worth County	1993-2002	
	Black Hawk County (partial): Black Hawk Township; Cedar Falls Township; Lincoln Township; Union Township; Cedar Falls; Hudson; Western half of Waterloo	2003-2012	
	Adair County Cass County (partial): Benton Township; Franklin Township; Grant Township; Lincoln Township; Anita; Wiota; Dallas County (partial): Excluding; Waukee; West Des Moines; Guthrie County; Polk County (partial): Madison Township; Union Township; Granger; Polk City; Sheldahl	2013-2022	
	Pottawattamie County (partial): Carter Lake; Council Bluffs; Excluding neighborhoods to the east of Interstate 80	2023-present	

== Recent election results from statewide races ==
Year	Office	Results
2008	President	Obama 53–45%
2012	President	Obama 54–46%
2016	President	Trump 51–41%
2016	Senate	Grassley 56–36%
2018	Governor	Reynolds 49–48%
2018	Attorney General	Miller 72–28%
2018	Secretary of State	Pate 50–47%
2018	Treasurer	Fitzgerald 50–47%
2018	Auditor	Mosiman 50–46%
2020	President	Trump 51–46%
2020	Senate	Ernst 48.0–47.2%
2022	Senate	Grassley 55–45%
2022	Governor	Reynolds 56–42%
2022	Attorney General	Bird 53–47%
2022	Secretary of State	Pate 56–44%
2022	Treasurer	Smith 54–46%
2022	Auditor	Halbur 55–45%
2024	President	Trump 53–45%

== See also ==
- Iowa General Assembly
- Iowa Senate
