= Iowa Highway 83 =

State highway in Iowa, United States

Iowa Highway 83
- Iowa 83 highlighted in red

Route information
- Maintained by Iowa DOT
- Length: 34.191 mi (55.025 km)

Major junctions
- West end: US 59 / CR G18 in Avoca
- US 6 / US 71 in Atlantic
- East end: Iowa 148 at Anita

Location
- Country: United States
- State: Iowa
- Counties: Pottawattamie; Cass

Highway system
- Iowa Primary Highway System; Interstate; US; State; Secondary; Scenic
← Iowa 81	→ Iowa 85

Iowa Highway 83 (Iowa 83) is a state highway that runs from east to west in western Iowa. The highway parallels Interstate 80 its entire length. Its western terminus is at U.S. Highway 59 in Avoca. The eastern terminus is in Anita at an intersection with Iowa Highway 148.

== Route description ==
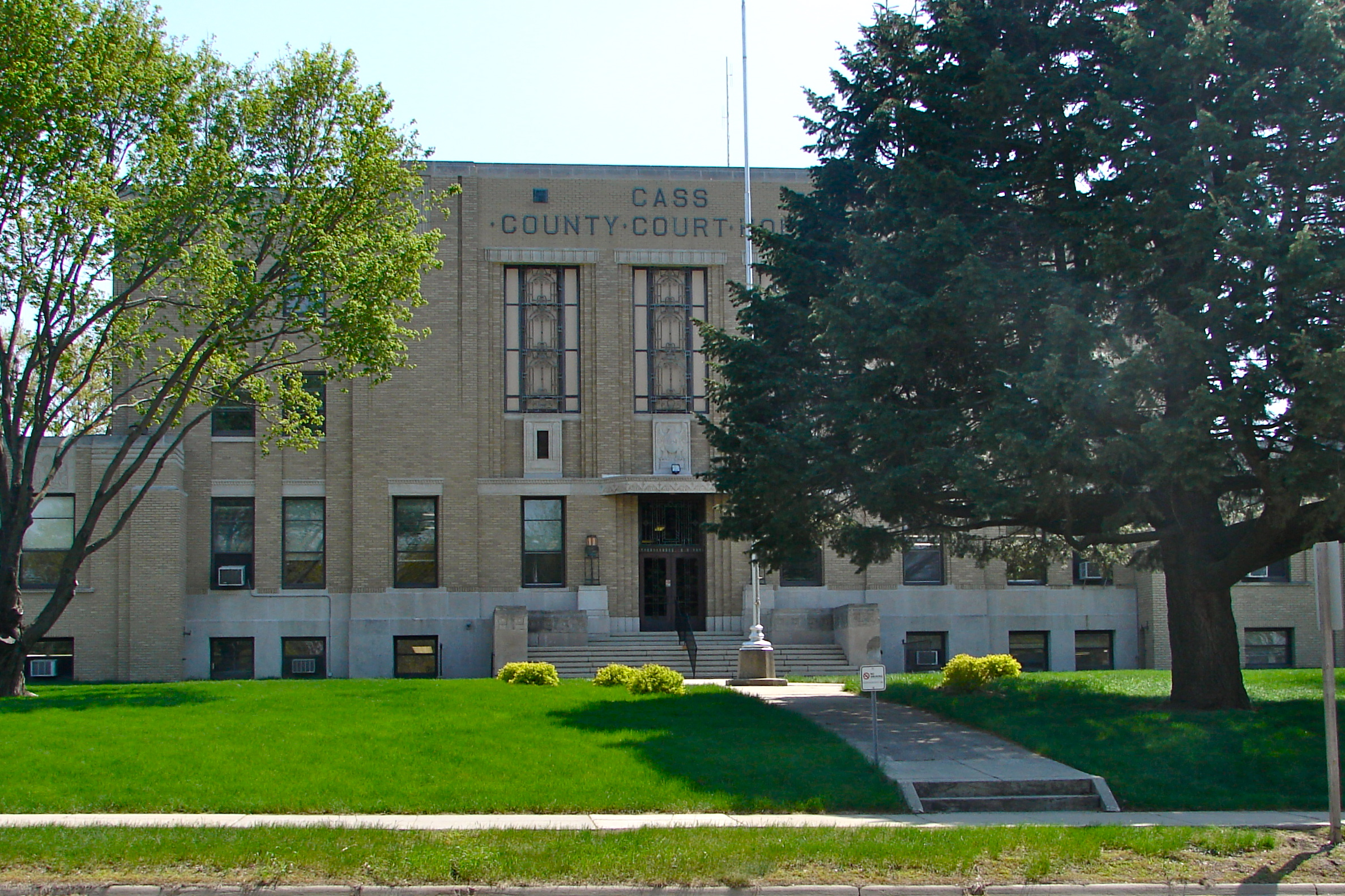
Cass County Court House in Atlantic

Iowa Highway 83 begins in Avoca at US 59. It heads eastward until Walnut, then briefly turns to the south before continuing east again. It goes through Marne then goes southeasterly towards Atlantic. It meets Iowa Highway 173 and then meets U.S. Highway 6 and U.S. Highway 71 in Atlantic. They overlap briefly, then US 6 and US 71 turn north and IA 83 continues east on a previous alignment for US 6. IA 83 passes through Wiota and ends in Anita at Iowa Highway 148.

== History ==
At its initial designation, IA 83 was a spur between Avoca and Walnut. On June 4, 1935, it was extended eastward to Atlantic, where it would end at US 6, replacing the old IA 271. On August 12, 1959, it was again expanded to the west from Avoca to near Neola at an intersection with the old IA 191. In 1973, the eastern segment was again extended from Atlantic to Anita. Finally, on July 1, 2003, the highway was truncated west of US 59, forming its present-day alignment. The old route west of US 59 is now Pottawattamie County Road G18.

== Major intersections ==
County	Location	mi	km	Destinations	Notes
Pottawattamie	Avoca	0.000	0.000	US 59 / CR G18	
Cass	Brighton Township	17.322	27.877	Iowa 173 north	Northwest of Atlantic
Cass	Atlantic	20.525	33.032	US 6 west	Western end of US 6 overlap.
Cass	Atlantic	22.101	35.568	US 71 south	Western end of US 71 overlap.
Cass	Grove Township	24.101	38.787	US 6 east / US 71 north	Eastern end of US 6 / US 71 overlap.
Cass	Anita	34.191	55.025	Iowa 148	Eastern terminus
1.000 mi = 1.609 km; 1.000 km = 0.621 mi: Concurrency terminus
