= Iowa Highway 48 =

State highway in Iowa, United States

Iowa Highway 48
- Iowa 48 highlighted in red

Route information
- Maintained by Iowa DOT
- Length: 47.919 mi (77.118 km)

Major junctions
- South end: US 59 at Shenandoah
- US 34 at Red Oak
- North end: US 6 near Lewis

Location
- Country: United States
- State: Iowa
- Counties: Page; Montgomery; Cass

Highway system
- Iowa Primary Highway System; Interstate; US; State; Secondary; Scenic
← Iowa 44	→ Iowa 51

Iowa Highway 48 is a 48-mile-long (77 km) state highway which runs from north to south in southwest Iowa. It begins at the northern edge of Shenandoah at U.S. Highway 59 and ends at U.S. Highway 6 near Lewis. The highway has seen few changes since its creation.

== Route description ==
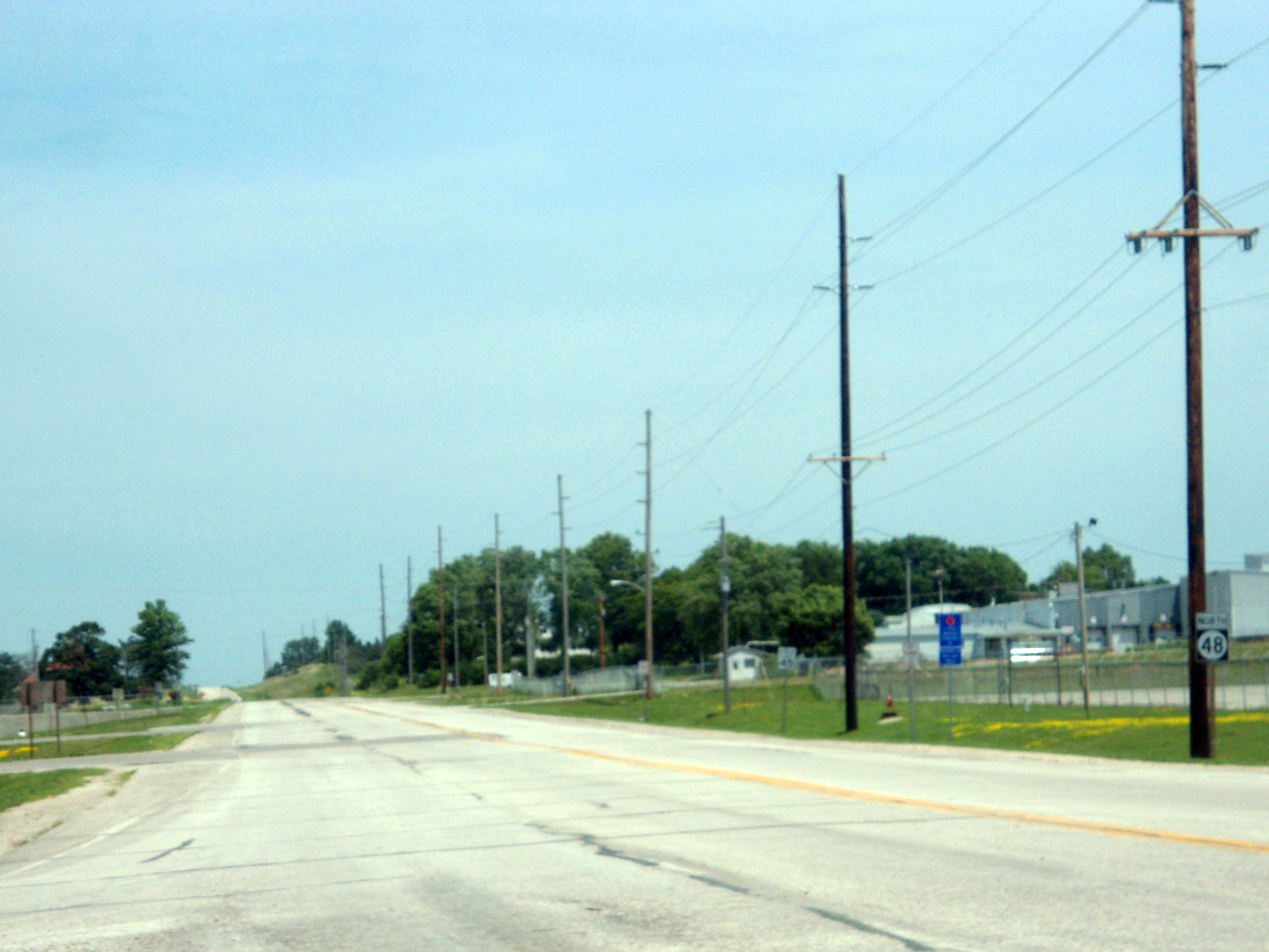
Iowa 48 runs north from its junction with US 34 in Red Oak

Iowa Highway 48 begins in Shenandoah at an intersection with U.S. Highway 59 (US 59), which serves as the line separating Fremont County and Page County. It heads east for one mile (1.6 km) before turning to the northeast to become parallel to a line of the BNSF Railway. It travels northeast for 6 miles (9.7 km) and turns east shortly after passing through Essex. Three miles (4.8 km) east of Essex, Iowa 48 turns north at an intersection with Page County Road J20 (CR J20).

From CR J20, Iowa 48 heads due north for 12 1/2 miles (20.1 km) to the intersection with US 34 in Red Oak. From Red Oak, Iowa 48 continues due north for 8 miles (13 km) until it turns east to cross the East Nishnabotna River and pass through Elliott before turning back to the north. It then travels north for 6 miles to Griswold, where it intersects Iowa 92. Iowa 48 continues north for 5 1/2 miles (8.9 km), again crossing the East Nishnabotna, until its northern end at U.S. Highway 6 west of Lewis.

== History ==
Originally, Iowa Highway 48 was a short highway connecting Shenandoah and Red Oak, roughly along the path the route takes today. By 1952, the route was in its present location and ended at US 6 west of Lewis. Only the original section had been paved at this time. By 1976, the entire highway was paved.

== Major intersections ==
County	Location	mi	km	Destinations	Notes
Fremont–Page county line	Shenandoah	0.000	0.000	US 59 – Emerson, Tarkio, Mo.	
Montgomery	Red Oak	23.155	37.264	US 34 – Corning, Glenwood	
Cass	Griswold	42.172	67.869	Iowa 92 (Main Street) – Carson, Cumberland	
Cass	Cass Township	47.919	77.118	US 6 – Atlantic, Oakland	
1.000 mi = 1.609 km; 1.000 km = 0.621 mi
