= Lake Anita State Park =

State park in Cass County, Iowa

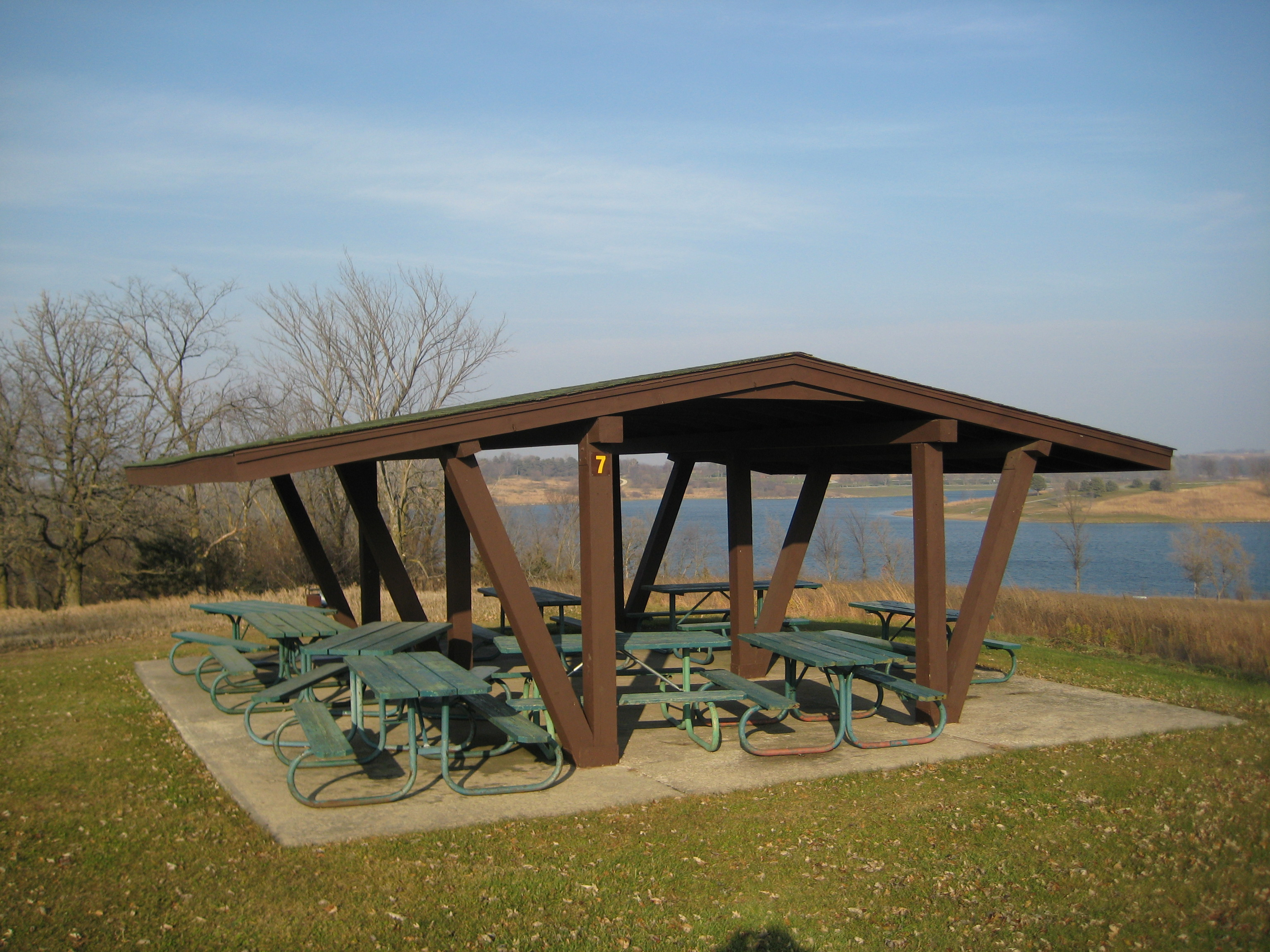

- Location within Iowa Location within the United States
- Location: Cass County, Iowa, United States
- Coordinates: 41°25′30″N 94°46′47″W
- Area: 1,062 acres (430 ha)
- Elevation: 1,276 ft (389 m)
- Established: 1961
- Administrator: Iowa Department of Natural Resources
- Website: Official website

Lake Anita State Park is a state park of Iowa, US, featuring a 171-acre (69 ha) reservoir on a branch of the Nishnabotna River. The park is located south of Anita on Iowa State Highway 148.

== Facilities ==
The campground, one of the most popular in southwest Iowa, offers 161 sites, two shower-and-restroom facilities, and a playground. Several picnic areas overlook the reservoir, and 8 open shelters can be reserved for private events.

== Recreation ==
Lake Anita State Park includes a beach and two boat ramps. All boating is at no-wake speeds. Docks are available for seasonal rent. Fishing is geared toward largemouth bass, crappies, and bluegills. A 1-mile (1.6 km) self-guided nature trail interprets the trees and shrubs of the region. A 4-mile (6.4 km) trail for walking and bicycling circles the lake.

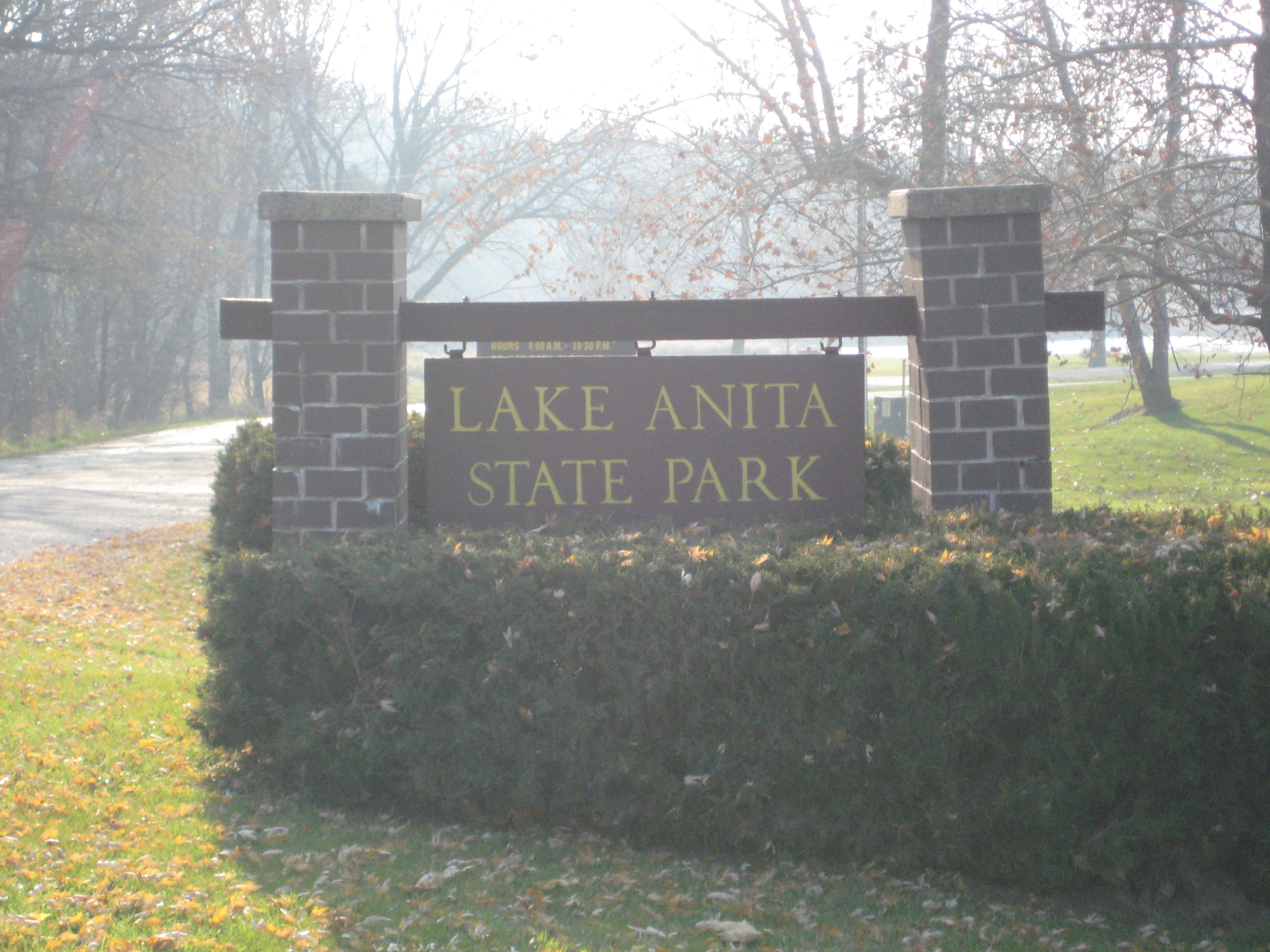
Entrance sign

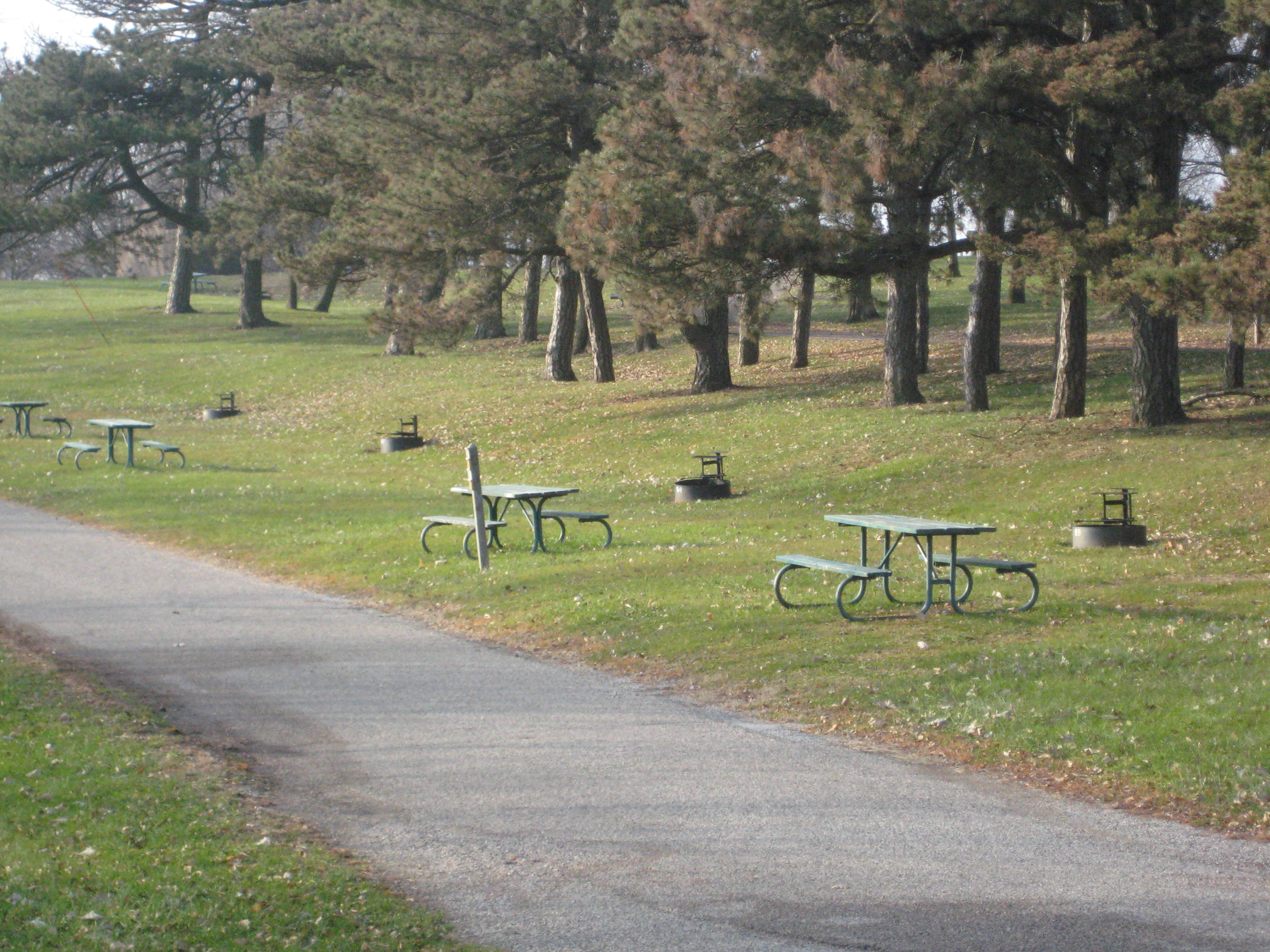
View of campground

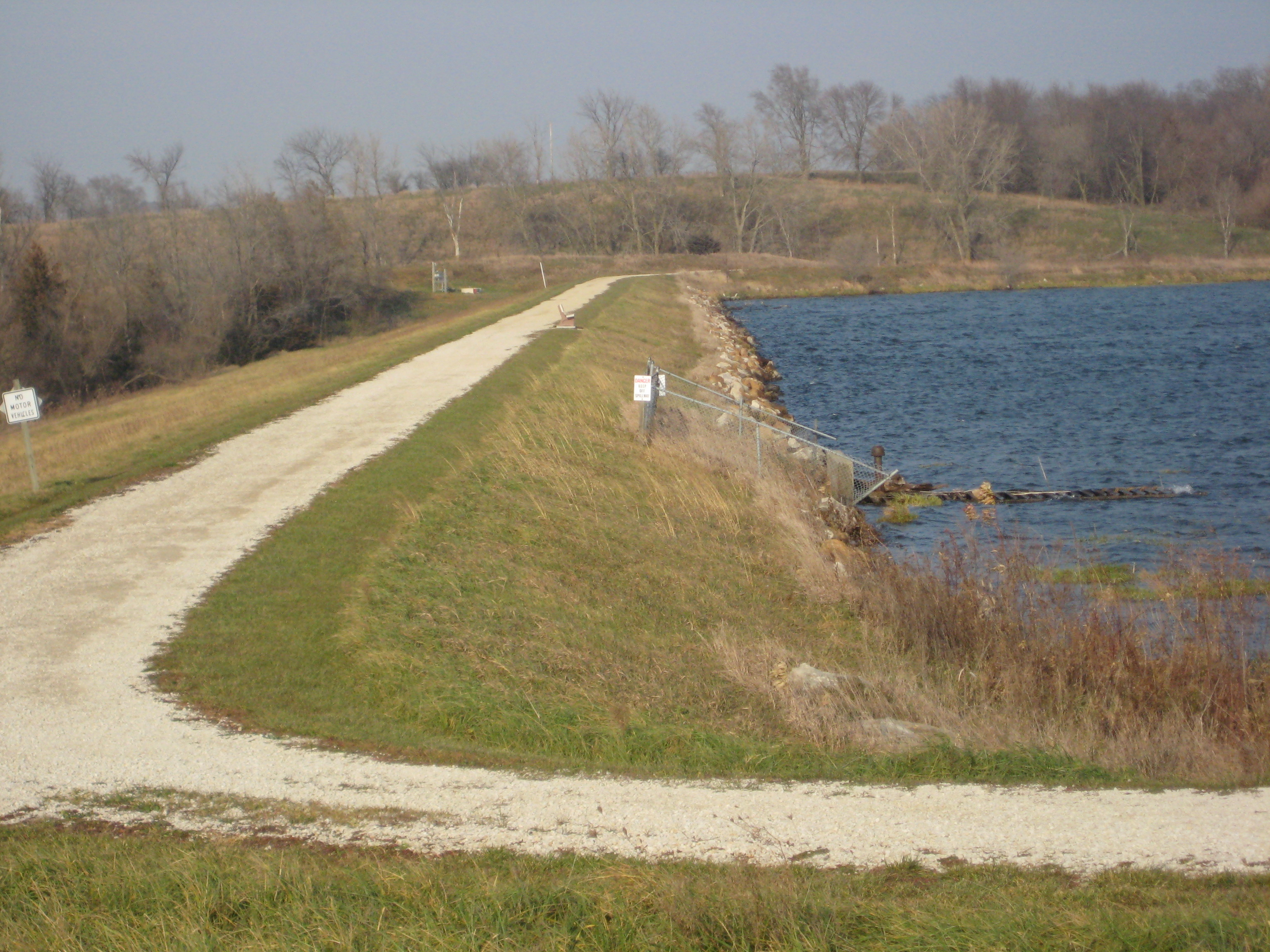
View of dam and trail
