= Iowa Highway 148 =

State highway in Iowa, United States

Iowa Highway 148
- Iowa 148 highlighted in red

Route information
- Maintained by Iowa DOT
- Length: 66.828 mi (107.549 km)

Major junctions
- South end: Route 148 near Hopkins, MO
- Iowa 2 at Bedford; US 34 at Corning; Iowa 92 at Massena
- North end: I-80 / US 6 near Anita

Location
- Country: United States
- State: Iowa
- Counties: Taylor; Adams; Cass

Highway system
- Iowa Primary Highway System; Interstate; US; State; Secondary; Scenic
← Iowa 146	→ Iowa 149

Iowa Highway 148 (Iowa 148) is a highway which runs in a north–south direction in southwestern Iowa. It has a length of 67 miles (108 km). The southern end of Iowa Highway 148 is at the Missouri border southwest of Bedford and just northeast of Hopkins, Missouri. The highway continues south into Missouri as Missouri Route 148. The northern end of Iowa 148 is at Interstate 80 (I-80) and U.S. Highway 6 (US 6) north of Anita.

== Route description ==
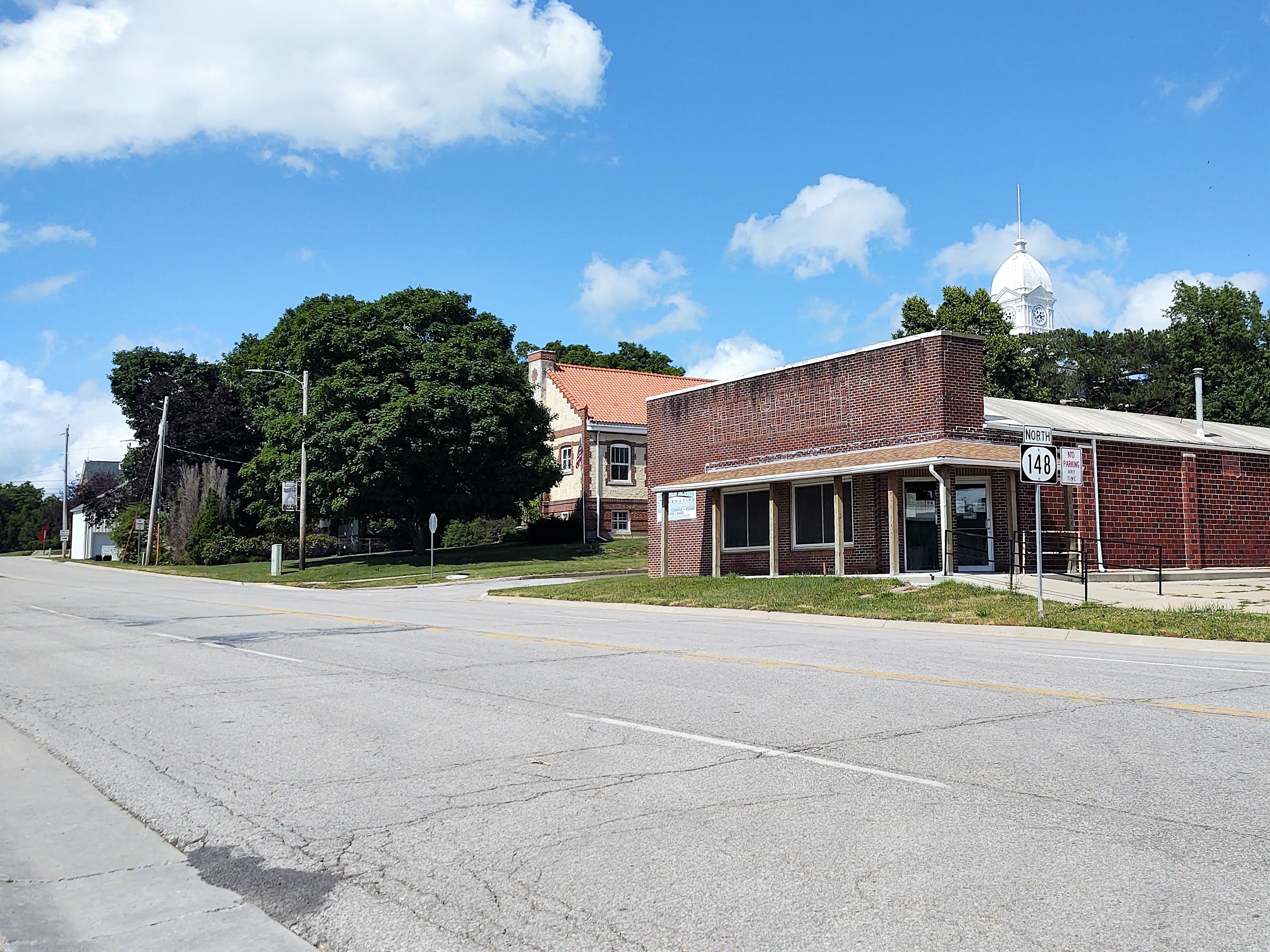
Iowa Highway 148 with downtown Bedford, IA in the background

Iowa 148 begins as a continuation of Route 148 northeast of Hopkins, Missouri. Between Hopkins and Bedford, the highway heads northeast, running parallel to the east fork of the One Hundred and Two River. At Bedford, the river goes east around the city while the highway turns north into town. For one-quarter mile, Iowa 148 overlaps Iowa 2, from Madison Street to Bent Street.

The route heads due north from Bedford, but jogs to the west near Lake of Three Fires State Park, but returns to a due-north course near Gravity. The highway then travels 15 1/2 miles (24.9 km) to an intersection with US 34 at Corning. The highway goes through the eastern side of Corning, wrapping around its north side, and then bearing west again before straightening out to the north. Passing through rural Adams and Cass Counties, Iowa 148 does not pass near another town for 20 miles (32 km), when it intersects Iowa 92 east of Massena.

Iowa 148 continues north from Massena, heading due north through the rolling farmland of Cass County for 12 miles (19 km) until it reaches Anita. At Anita, the route curves into town along Michigan Street and crosses the Iowa Interstate Railroad right before it meets Main Street, the corner of Main and Michigan represents the eastern end of Iowa 83. Iowa 148 briefly turns onto Main Street, heading northeast, and then turns back due north. Four miles (6.4 km) north of Anita, Iowa 148 ends at exit 70 along I-80 / US 6.

== History ==
Portions of Iowa 148 have been in Iowa's Primary Highway System since its inception in 1920. The section between Bedford and Corning was part of Primary Road No. 16, most of that route was replaced by US 169 upon its designation in 1930. By 1947, Iowa 148 had been designated from the Missouri state line to Anita. When US 6 was relocated onto I-80 between the Atlantic and Adair exits in 1972, Iowa 148 was extended north to its present-day end at I-80.

== Major intersections ==
County	Location	mi	km	Destinations	Notes
Taylor	Ross Township	0.000	0.000	Route 148 south – Hopkins	Continuation into Missouri
Taylor	Bedford	8.520	13.712	Iowa 2 east – Mount Ayr	Southern end of Iowa 2 overlap
Taylor	Bedford	8.743	14.070	Iowa 2 west – Clarinda	Northern end of Iowa 2 overlap
Adams	Corning	29.942	48.187	US 34 – Red Oak, Creston	
Cass	Massena Township	50.004	80.474	Iowa 92 – Massena, Fontanelle	
Cass	Anita	62.959	101.323	Iowa 83 west – Atlantic	
Cass	Grant Township	66.828	107.549	I-80 / US 6 – Des Moines, Council Bluffs	
1.000 mi = 1.609 km; 1.000 km = 0.621 mi: Concurrency terminus
