= Pleasant Township, Cass County, Iowa =

Township in Iowa, US

Pleasant Township, Cass County
- Township
- Coordinates: 41°12′39″N 095°06′12″W
- Country: United States
- State: Iowa
- County: Cass

Area
  - Total: 35.23 sq mi (91.25 km^{2})
  - Land: 35.23 sq mi (91.25 km^{2})
  - Water: 0 sq mi (0 km^{2})
- Elevation: 1,211 ft (369 m)

Population (2000)
  - Total: 1,301
  - Density: 37/sq mi (14.3/km^{2})
- FIPS code: 19-93360
- GNIS feature ID: 0468528

Pleasant Township is one of sixteen townships in Cass County, Iowa, USA. As of the 2000 census, its population was 1,301.

== Geography ==
Pleasant Township covers an area of 35.23 square miles (91.2 km^{2}) and contains one incorporated settlement, Griswold. According to the USGS, it contains two cemeteries: Lowman and Pleasant Township.
