= Bear Grove Township =

Bear Grove Township may refer to the following townships in the United States:

- Bear Grove Township, Fayette County, Illinois
- Bear Grove Township, Cass County, Iowa
- Bear Grove Township, Guthrie County, Iowa
