= Griswold Community School District =

Public school district in Griswold, Iowa, United States

Coordinates: 41.239480°N 95.135343°W

Location
- Griswold, Iowa Cass, Montgomery, and Pottawattamie counties United States
- Coordinates: 41.239480, -95.135343

District information
- Type: Local school district
- Grades: K-12
- Superintendent: David Henrichs
- Schools: 2
- Budget: $9,144,000 (2020-21)
- NCES District ID: 1913230

Students and staff
- Students: 431 (2022-23)
- Teachers: 40.82 FTE
- Staff: 58.43 FTE
- Student–teacher ratio: 10.56
- Athletic conference: Corner Conference
- District mascot: Tigers
- Colors: Blue and White

Other information
- Website: www.griswoldschools.org

Griswold Community School District is a rural public school district headquartered in Griswold, Iowa, serving sections of Cass, Montgomery, and Pottawattamie counties.

Communities in its service area are Griswold, Elliott, Grant, and Lewis.

== Schools ==
The district operates two schools on one campus in Griswold:

- Griswold Elementary School
- Griswold Middle and Senior High School

=== Griswold High School ===
==== Athletics ====
The Tigers compete in the Corner Conference in the following sports:

- Cross Country (boys and girls)
- Volleyball
- Football
- Basketball (boys and girls)
- Wrestling
- Track and Field (boys and girls)
- Golf (boys and girls)
- Baseball
- Softball

== See also ==
- List of school districts in Iowa
- List of high schools in Iowa
