= Cass County Courthouse (Iowa) =

- Cass County Court House
- U.S. National Register of Historic Places
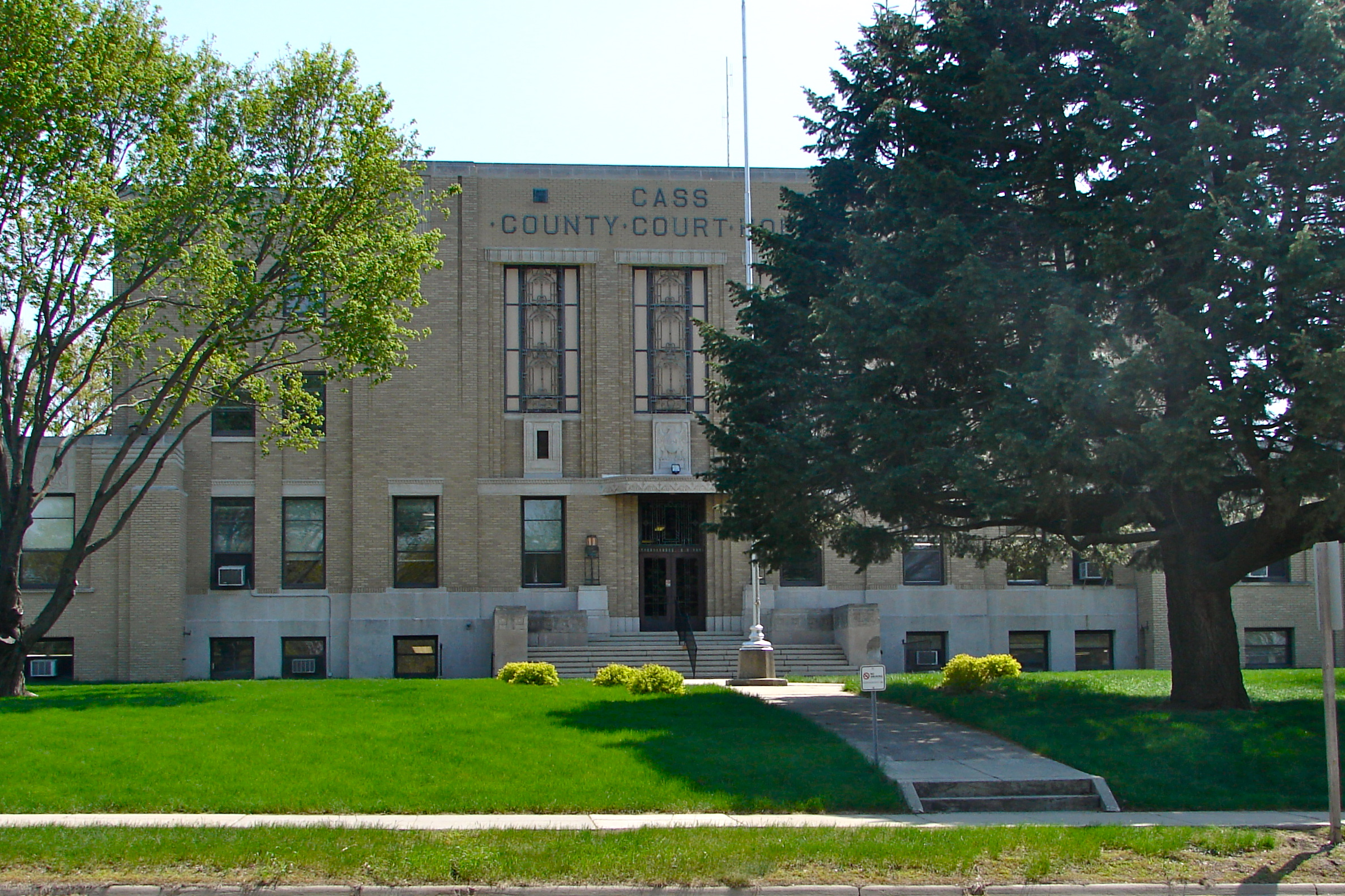
- The Cass County courthouse in downtown Atlantic

- Location within Iowa Location within the United States
- Interactive map showing the location for Cass County Courthouse
- Location: 5 W. 7th St. Atlantic, Iowa
- Coordinates: 41°24′12.5″N 95°0′50″W
- Area: less than 5 acres (2.0 ha)
- Built: 1934
- Built by: C.C. Larsen Co.
- Architects: Dougher, Rich and Woodburn
- Architectural style: PWA Moderne
- MPS: PWA-Era County Courthouses of IA MPS
- NRHP reference No.: 03000819
- Added to NRHP: August 28, 2003

The Cass County Courthouse in Atlantic, Iowa, United States, was built in 1934 as the first courthouse in the state built with funding from the Public Works Administration (PWA). It was listed on the National Register of Historic Places in 2003 as a part of the PWA-Era County Courthouses of Iowa Multiple Properties Submission. The courthouse is the third structure to house court functions and county administration.

== History ==
Cass County was organized in 1853. The first county commissioners met in the small settlement of Indiantown and chose a place called Lewis as the county seat where they used a two-story house for the courthouse. The Chicago, Rock Island and Pacific Railroad extended tracks to Atlantic and the town offered the county land for a new courthouse. In 1869, the county accepted Atlantic's offer and constructed a small frame building on the site. The building soon proved to be inadequate and the county rented the nearby Park House to provide additional space. In 1888, the county spent $50,000 to erect a new two-story brick and stone courthouse that featured a clock tower. It was destroyed by fire in March 1932.

Because of the Great Depression, the first referendum to build a new courthouse failed in the General Election of 1932. The following year President Franklin Delano Roosevelt began the PWA, and Cass County was the first of ten counties in Iowa to receive such funding. Voters passed the second referendum in 1933 and the county retained the Des Moines architectural firm of Dougher, Rich & Woodburn to design the new building. C.C. Larsen Co. of Council Bluffs, Iowa won the bid to construct the building and work began in March 1934. It was built for $119,000. The new building was dedicated on December 26, 1934, with Governor Clyde L. Herring as the main speaker.

Dougher, Rich & Woodburn was able to save three other Iowa counties money by providing a similar design for their county's new courthouse. Newspapers in Buchanan and Humboldt counties printed drawings that were nearly identical when they were planning to build new courthouses in the 1930s.

A two-bay garage of matching brick was built in the southwest corner of the square shortly after the courthouse was completed. Around 1984 a 1½-story addition was built onto the west side of the courthouse for a correctional facility.

== Architecture ==
The architectural style of the building is known as Depression Modern or PWA Moderne. The building features a symmetrical façade with a central section flanked by two lower wings. The exterior is composed of buff-colored brick and Bedford limestone trim. It is three stories tall above a raised basement. On the interior, central corridors on each floor extend the length of the building, with the offices opening onto the corridors. The building features multi-colored terrazzo floors, marble wainscoting, and acoustic tiles. The three tall windows with decorative metal grills that extend from the second to the third floors of the main elevation mark the location of the courtroom, which was decorated in dark wood tones and Art Deco ornamentation. The exterior of the adjoining correctional facility is composed of similar colored brick as the courthouse, and it has no windows.

The building is located on the courthouse square to the south of the central business district, where the previous courthouse was also located. There are three other elements that are contributing properties on the courthouse's nomination to the National Register of Historic Places. The square itself is a contributing site, what is believed to be the original flagpole is a contributing object, and the two-bay garage is another contributing building
