= Union Township, Cass County, Iowa =

Township in Iowa, US

Union Township, Cass County
- Township
- Coordinates: 41°16′51″N 094°52′19″W
- Country: United States
- State: Iowa
- County: Cass

Area
  - Total: 34.95 sq mi (90.53 km^{2})
  - Land: 34.9 sq mi (90.5 km^{2})
  - Water: 0.012 sq mi (0.03 km^{2})
- Elevation: 1,319 ft (402 m)

Population (2000)
  - Total: 495
  - Density: 14/sq mi (5.5/km^{2})
- FIPS code: 19-94185
- GNIS feature ID: 0468813

Union Township is one of sixteen townships in Cass County, Iowa, USA. As of the 2000 census, its population was 495.

== Geography ==
Union Township covers an area of 34.95 square miles (90.5 km^{2}) and contains one incorporated settlement, Cumberland. According to the USGS, it contains one cemetery, Greenwood.
