= Cass Township, Cass County, Iowa =

Township in Iowa, US

Cass Township, Cass County
- Township
- Coordinates: 41°17′22″N 095°06′02″W
- Country: United States
- State: Iowa
- County: Cass

Area
  - Total: 35.67 sq mi (92.39 km^{2})
  - Land: 35.65 sq mi (92.34 km^{2})
  - Water: 0.019 sq mi (0.05 km^{2})
- Elevation: 1,120 ft (340 m)

Population (2000)
  - Total: 691
  - Density: 19/sq mi (7.5/km^{2})
- FIPS code: 19-90492
- GNIS feature ID: 0467538

Cass Township is one of sixteen townships in Cass County, Iowa, United States. As of the 2000 census, its population was 691.

== Geography ==
Cass Township covers an area of 35.67 square miles (92.4 km^{2}) and contains one incorporated settlement, Lewis. According to the USGS, it contains two cemeteries: Oakwood and Smith.
