= Noble Township, Cass County, Iowa =

Township in Iowa, US

Noble Township, Cass County
- Township
- Coordinates: 41°12′05″N 094°59′09″W
- Country: United States
- State: Iowa
- County: Cass

Area
  - Total: 35.21 sq mi (91.19 km^{2})
  - Land: 35.21 sq mi (91.19 km^{2})
  - Water: 0 sq mi (0 km^{2})
- Elevation: 1,240 ft (378 m)

Population (2000)
  - Total: 367
  - Density: 10/sq mi (4/km^{2})
- FIPS code: 19-93117
- GNIS feature ID: 0468444

Noble Township is one of sixteen townships in Cass County, Iowa, USA. As of the 2000 census, its population was 367.

== Geography ==
Noble Township covers an area of 35.21 square miles (91.2 km^{2}) and contains no incorporated settlements. According to the USGS, it contains four cemeteries: Newlons Grove, Noble Center, Saint Johns and Weirich.
