= Victoria Township, Cass County, Iowa =

Township in Iowa, US

Victoria Township, Cass County
- Township
- Location of Victoria Township within Cass County
- Coordinates: 41°12′07″N 094°45′28″W
- Country: United States
- State: Iowa
- County: Cass

Area
  - Total: 35.37 sq mi (91.61 km^{2})
  - Land: 35.35 sq mi (91.55 km^{2})
  - Water: 0.023 sq mi (0.06 km^{2})
- Elevation: 1,358 ft (414 m)

Population (2000)
  - Total: 173
  - Density: 4.9/sq mi (1.9/km^{2})
- FIPS code: 19-94350
- GNIS feature ID: 0468867

Victoria Township is one of sixteen townships in Cass County, Iowa, USA. As of the 2000 census, its population was 173.

== Geography ==
Victoria Township covers an area of 35.37 square miles (91.6 km^{2}) and contains no incorporated settlements. According to the USGS, it contains one cemetery, Victoria.
