= Franklin Township, Cass County, Iowa =

Township in Iowa, US

Franklin Township, Cass County
- Township
- Coordinates: 41°22′27″N 094°51′49″W
- Country: United States
- State: Iowa
- County: Cass

Area
  - Total: 34.64 sq mi (89.73 km^{2})
  - Land: 34.57 sq mi (89.54 km^{2})
  - Water: 0.073 sq mi (0.19 km^{2})
- Elevation: 1,276 ft (389 m)

Population (2000)
  - Total: 397
  - Density: 11/sq mi (4.4/km^{2})
- FIPS code: 19-91392
- GNIS feature ID: 0467851

Franklin Township is one of sixteen townships in Cass County, Iowa, United States. As of the 2000 census, its population was 397.

== Geography ==
Franklin Township covers an area of 34.64 square miles (89.7 km^{2}) and contains one incorporated settlement, Wiota. According to the USGS, it contains three cemeteries: Franklin Lutheran, Norway Center and Wiota. The former unincorporated community of Norway Center was located in Franklin Township.
