= Washington Township, Cass County, Iowa =

Township in Iowa, US

Washington Township, Cass County
- Township
- Coordinates: 41°22′26″N 095°05′53″W
- Country: United States
- State: Iowa
- County: Cass

Area
  - Total: 35.35 sq mi (91.55 km^{2})
  - Land: 35.3 sq mi (91.5 km^{2})
  - Water: 0.019 sq mi (0.05 km^{2})
- Elevation: 1,198 ft (365 m)

Population (2000)
  - Total: 310
  - Density: 8.8/sq mi (3.4/km^{2})
- FIPS code: 19-94470
- GNIS feature ID: 0468908

Washington Township is one of sixteen townships in Cass County, Iowa, United States. As of the 2000 census, its population was 310.

== Geography ==
Washington Township covers an area of 35.35 square miles (91.6 km^{2}) and contains no incorporated settlements.
