= Lincoln Township, Cass County, Iowa =

Township in Iowa, US

Lincoln Township, Cass County
- Township
- Coordinates: 41°22′04″N 094°45′11″W
- Country: United States
- State: Iowa
- County: Cass

Area
  - Total: 35.59 sq mi (92.19 km^{2})
  - Land: 35.56 sq mi (92.11 km^{2})
  - Water: 0.031 sq mi (0.08 km^{2})
- Elevation: 1,309 ft (399 m)

Population (2000)
  - Total: 185
  - Density: 5.2/sq mi (2/km^{2})
- FIPS code: 19-92535
- GNIS feature ID: 0468244

Lincoln Township is one of sixteen townships in Cass County, Iowa, USA. As of the 2000 census, its population was 185.

== Geography ==
Lincoln Township covers an area of 35.59 square miles (92.2 km^{2}) and contains no incorporated settlements. According to the USGS, it contains one cemetery, Lincoln Center.
