= Brighton Township, Cass County, Iowa =

Township in Iowa, US

Brighton Township, Cass County
- Township
- Coordinates: 41°27′44″N 095°06′01″W
- Country: United States
- State: Iowa
- County: Cass

Area
  - Total: 35.55 sq mi (92.07 km^{2})
  - Land: 35.55 sq mi (92.07 km^{2})
  - Water: 0 sq mi (0 km^{2})
- Elevation: 1,302 ft (397 m)

Population (2000)
  - Total: 377
  - Density: 11/sq mi (4.1/km^{2})
- FIPS code: 19-90336
- GNIS feature ID: 0467485

Brighton Township is one of sixteen townships in Cass County, Iowa, United States. As of the 2000 census, its population was 377.

== Geography ==
Brighton Township covers an area of 35.55 square miles (92.1 km^{2}) and contains one incorporated settlement, Marne. According to the USGS, it contains one cemetery, Brighton.
