= Bear Grove Township, Cass County, Iowa =

Township in Iowa, US

Bear Grove Township, Cass County
- Township
- Coordinates: 41°17′19″N 094°59′08″W
- Country: United States
- State: Iowa
- County: Cass

Area
  - Total: 35.62 sq mi (92.26 km^{2})
  - Land: 35.58 sq mi (92.14 km^{2})
  - Water: 0.046 sq mi (0.12 km^{2})
- Elevation: 1,194 ft (364 m)

Population (2000)
  - Total: 270
  - Density: 7.5/sq mi (2.9/km^{2})
- FIPS code: 19-90144
- GNIS feature ID: 0467420

Bear Grove Township is one of sixteen townships in Cass County, Iowa, United States. As of the 2000 census, its population was 270.

== Geography ==
Bear Grove Township covers an area of 35.62 square miles (92.3 km^{2}) and contains no incorporated settlements.
