= Union Township, Polk County, Iowa =

Township in Iowa

Coordinates: 41°50′38″N 93°45′53″W

Union Township is a township in Polk County, Iowa, United States.

Its elevation is listed as 942 feet above mean sea level.

== History ==
Union Township was established after 1880.
