= Edwin Perkins (inventor) =

American inventor

- Born: January 8, 1889; Lewis, Iowa
- Died: July 3, 1961 (aged 72); Olmsted County, Minnesota
- Known for: Kool-Aid
- Spouse: Kitty Shoemaker
- Children: 1

Edwin Elijah Perkins (January 8, 1889 – July 3, 1961), born in Lewis, Iowa, United States, invented the powdered drink mix Kool-Aid in 1927 in Hastings, Nebraska, after his family had moved to Hendley, Nebraska from Iowa in 1893.

As a young man he worked with products like Jell-O, which was sold in his father's general store in Hendley. When Perkins came to Hastings at age 31 in 1920, his principal interests were patent medicines and household products. He began producing a line of over 125 "Onor-Maid" items which were sold door-to-door and by mail. One of the most popular was "Fruit-Smack", a fruit-flavored liquid concentrate. By 1927 he had developed a powdered soft drink mix called Kool-Ade, which he packaged in envelopes and sold in grocery stores, promising 10 glasses of beverage for 10 cents. Demand for this product was so great that it soon had international sales. Soon the Perkins Products Company focused entirely on Kool-Aid. In 1931 Perkins relocated to Chicago. By 1934 the name was changed to Kool-Aid. The company was sold to General Foods in 1953.

Kool-Aid later became a household name and made Edwin Perkins a wealthy man. The Perkins family remembered its Nebraska roots, donating generously to philanthropies in Adams County and elsewhere in the state. Among local gifts were Perkins Recital Hall and Perkins Library at Hastings College and Perkins Pavilion at Good Samaritan Village.

A recreation of his father's general store, family artifacts and Kool-Aid memorabilia are housed at the Hastings Museum in Hastings, Nebraska. He died in 1961.
