= Grove Township, Cass County, Iowa =

Township in Iowa, US

Grove Township, Cass County
- Township
- Coordinates: 41°22′34″N 094°58′48″W
- Country: United States
- State: Iowa
- County: Cass

Area
  - Total: 35.35 sq mi (91.55 km^{2})
  - Land: 35.25 sq mi (91.31 km^{2})
  - Water: 0.089 sq mi (0.23 km^{2})
- Elevation: 1,234 ft (376 m)

Population (2000)
  - Total: 7,608
  - Density: 216/sq mi (83.3/km^{2})
- FIPS code: 19-91779
- GNIS feature ID: 0467981

Grove Township is one of sixteen townships in Cass County, Iowa, USA. As of the 2000 census, its population was 7,608.

== History ==
Grove Township was originally named Atlantic Township, until the fall of 1885 when it was renamed to Grove Township. The name Atlantic Township continued to be used for the area within the boundaries of Atlantic city, while Grove Township lies outside the city.

== Geography ==
Grove Township covers an area of 35.35 square miles (91.6 km^{2}) and contains one incorporated settlement, Atlantic. According to the USGS, it contains two cemeteries: Atlantic and Southlawn Memorial Gardens.
