= Madison Township, Polk County, Iowa =

Township in Polk County, Iowa, U.S.

Coordinates: 41.803°N 93.726°W

Madison Township is a township in Polk County, Iowa, United States. Currently Diane Conway serves as clerk with a term expiring in 2018. Trustees Include: Raymond Conway (Term Expiring 2018), Jon Johnson (Term Expiring 2016), and Doug Currie (Term Expiring 2016)

== History ==
Madison Township was organized in 1847.
