= Cass County, Iowa =

County in Iowa, United States

- County
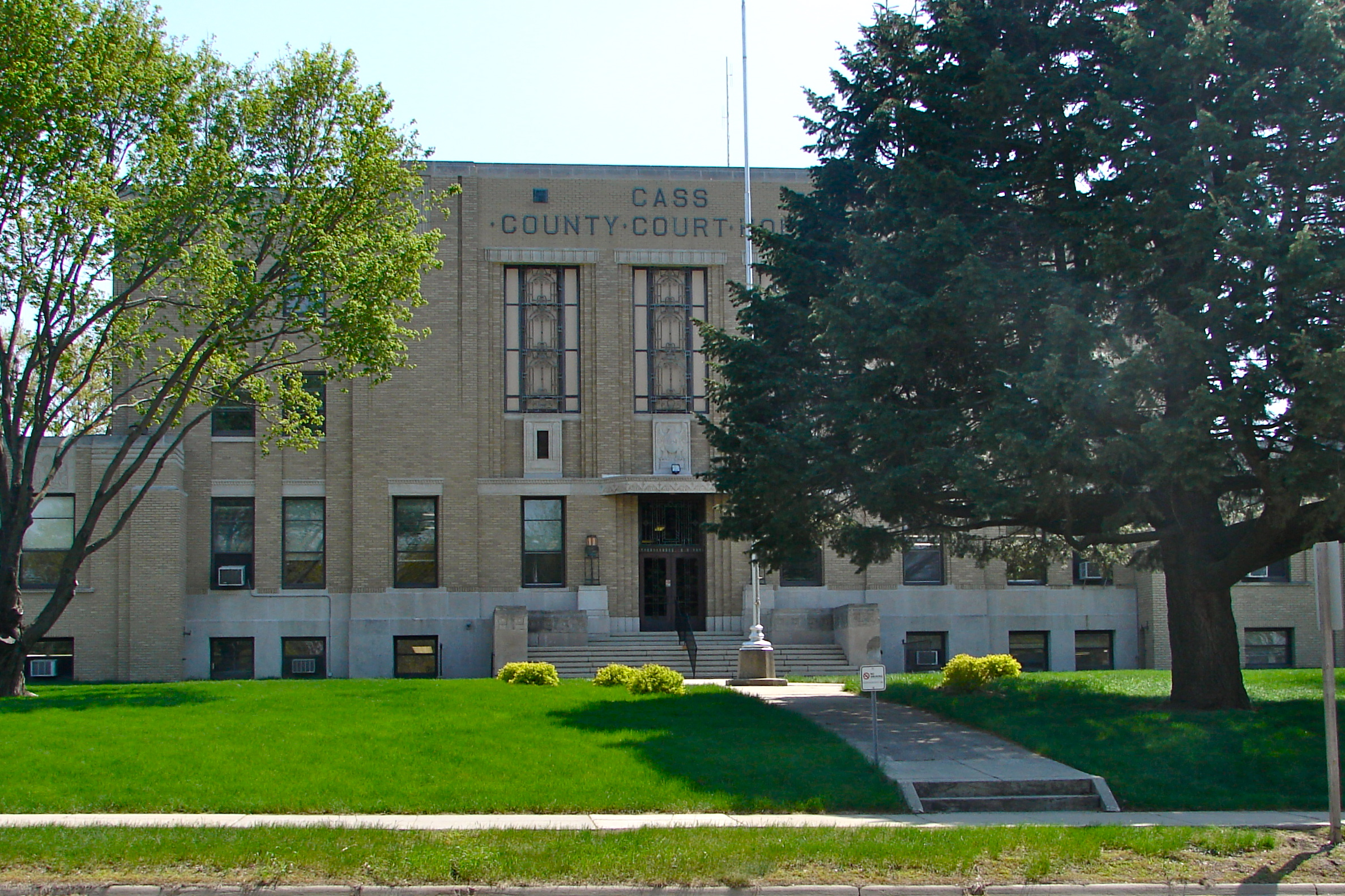
- Cass County Courthouse

- Location within the U.S. state of Iowa
- Coordinates: 41°19′46″N 94°55′45″W
- Country: United States
- State: Iowa
- Founded: 1851
- Named for: Lewis Cass
- Seat: Atlantic
- Largest city: Atlantic

Area
  - Total: 565 sq mi (1,460 km^{2})
  - Land: 564 sq mi (1,460 km^{2})
  - Water: 0.7 sq mi (1.8 km^{2}) 0.1%

Population (2020)
  - Total: 13,127
  - Estimate (2025): 12,960 ▼
  - Density: 23.3/sq mi (8.99/km^{2})
- Time zone: UTC−6 (Central)
  - Summer (DST): UTC−5 (CDT)
- Congressional district: 3rd
- Website: www.casscountyia.gov
- Iowa county number 15

Cass County is a county located in the U.S. state of Iowa. As of the 2020 census, the population was 13,127. Its county seat is Atlantic. It was named to honor Lewis Cass, who was the 1848 Democratic nominee for president.

== History ==
Cass County is named in honor of Lewis Cass, a Michigan senator and an unsuccessful Democratic candidate for the presidency in 1848. The county was established within its present boundaries in 1851 and originated in 1853. Religious persecution was responsible for bringing the first people of European ancestry to Cass County. The Mormons, fleeing from Illinois, were the earliest settlers, and established a community at Indiantown in 1846.

At Indiantown, two of the three commissioners selected to locate a county seat were chosen. The site they chose was one mile (1.6 km) from Indiantown and named Lewis. Most of the people and businesses in Indian Town moved to Lewis shortly after it was laid out. In 1856, a frame courthouse was built, and eight years later a small stone building was completed for the county treasurer's office. In 1857, there was an attempt to relocate the county seat to Grove City; it was unsuccessful. On October 20, 1869, after a due canvass of the vote on the re-location of the county seat, the Board declared the city of Atlantic the county seat and ordered the county officers to that place.

Soils of Cass County

In 1872, the first courthouse built in Atlantic was completed. Until it was completed county offices were held in various empty buildings. Ten years later the county built its second courthouse at Atlantic. The $65,000 building was destroyed by a fire in 1932. The fire started in the clock tower and gutted all of the second floor. Most of the county records and equipment were saved.

The present, fourth, courthouse was completed in 1934. While it was being built, county offices were located in the Atlantic Motors building, where an attempted robbery of the treasurer's safe took place. The robbers were interrupted and escaped, but without any money. The final cost of the fourth courthouse was $130,000: $65,000 came from a county bond issue, $46,500 from insurance and the remaining was covered by a Public Works Administration federal grant. The concrete and brick building is three stories high. It was dedicated on December 26, 1934, with the main speaker being the Governor of Iowa, Clyde L. Herring. The Board of Supervisors approved a new jail addition, which was dedicated in 1984.

== Geography ==
According to the U.S. Census Bureau, the county has a total area of 565 square miles (1,460 km^{2}), of which 564 square miles (1,460 km^{2}) is land and 0.7 square miles (1.8 km^{2}) (0.1%) is water.

=== Major highways ===
- Interstate 80
- U.S. Highway 6
- U.S. Highway 71
- Iowa Highway 48
- Iowa Highway 83
- Iowa Highway 92
- Iowa Highway 148
- Iowa Highway 173

=== Adjacent counties ===
- Audubon County (north)
- Adair County (east)
- Adams County (southeast)
- Montgomery County (southwest)
- Pottawattamie County (west)
- Shelby County (northwest)

=== Other Geographical notes ===
Due to its proximity to Cass County, Nebraska, and because both of those counties receive most of their broadcasts from Omaha, Nebraska, references to 'Cass County' must be frequently disambiguated, or result in confusion.

== Demographics ==
Historical population
| Census | Pop. | Note | %± |
|---|---|---|---|
| 1860 | 1,612 | | — |
| 1870 | 5,464 | | 239.0% |
| 1880 | 16,943 | | 210.1% |
| 1890 | 19,642 | | 15.9% |
| 1900 | 21,274 | | 8.3% |
| 1910 | 19,047 | | −10.5% |
| 1920 | 19,421 | | 2.0% |
| 1930 | 19,422 | | 0.0% |
| 1940 | 18,647 | | −4.0% |
| 1950 | 18,532 | | −0.6% |
| 1960 | 17,919 | | −3.3% |
| 1970 | 17,007 | | −5.1% |
| 1980 | 16,932 | | −0.4% |
| 1990 | 15,128 | | −10.7% |
| 2000 | 14,684 | | −2.9% |
| 2010 | 13,956 | | −5.0% |
| 2020 | 13,127 | | −5.9% |
| 2025 (est.) | 12,960 | ▼ | −1.3% |
U.S. Decennial Census; 1790-1960 1900-1990; 1990-2000 2010-2018

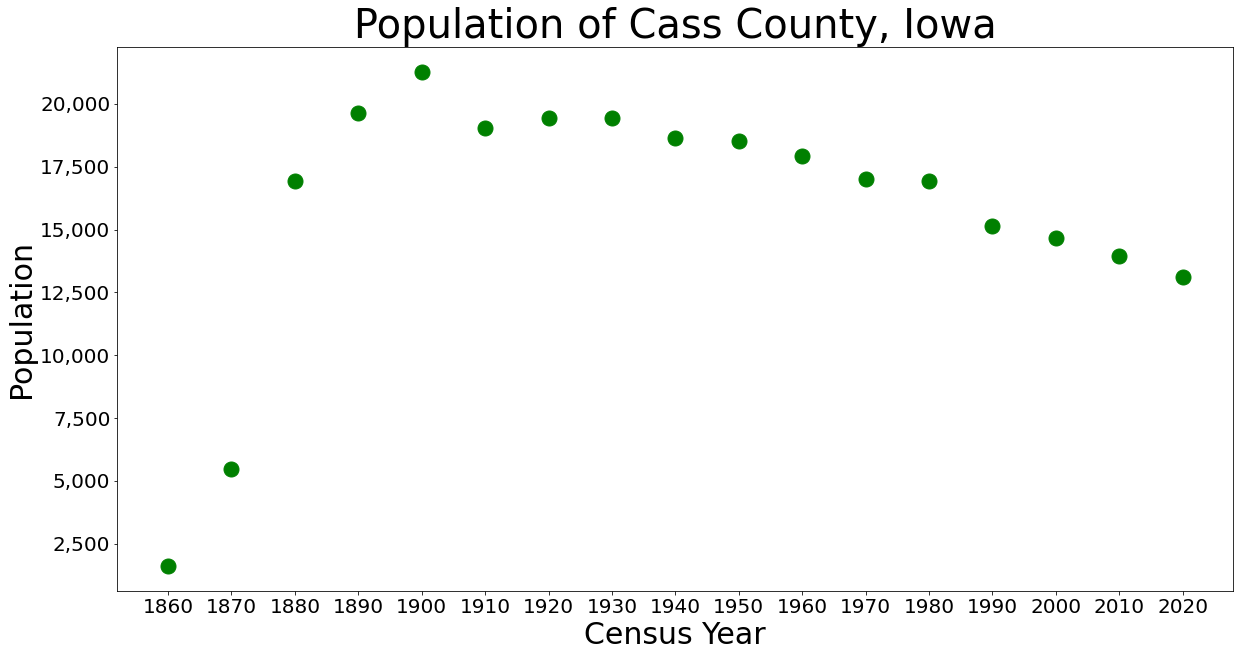
Population of Cass County from US census data

=== 2020 census ===
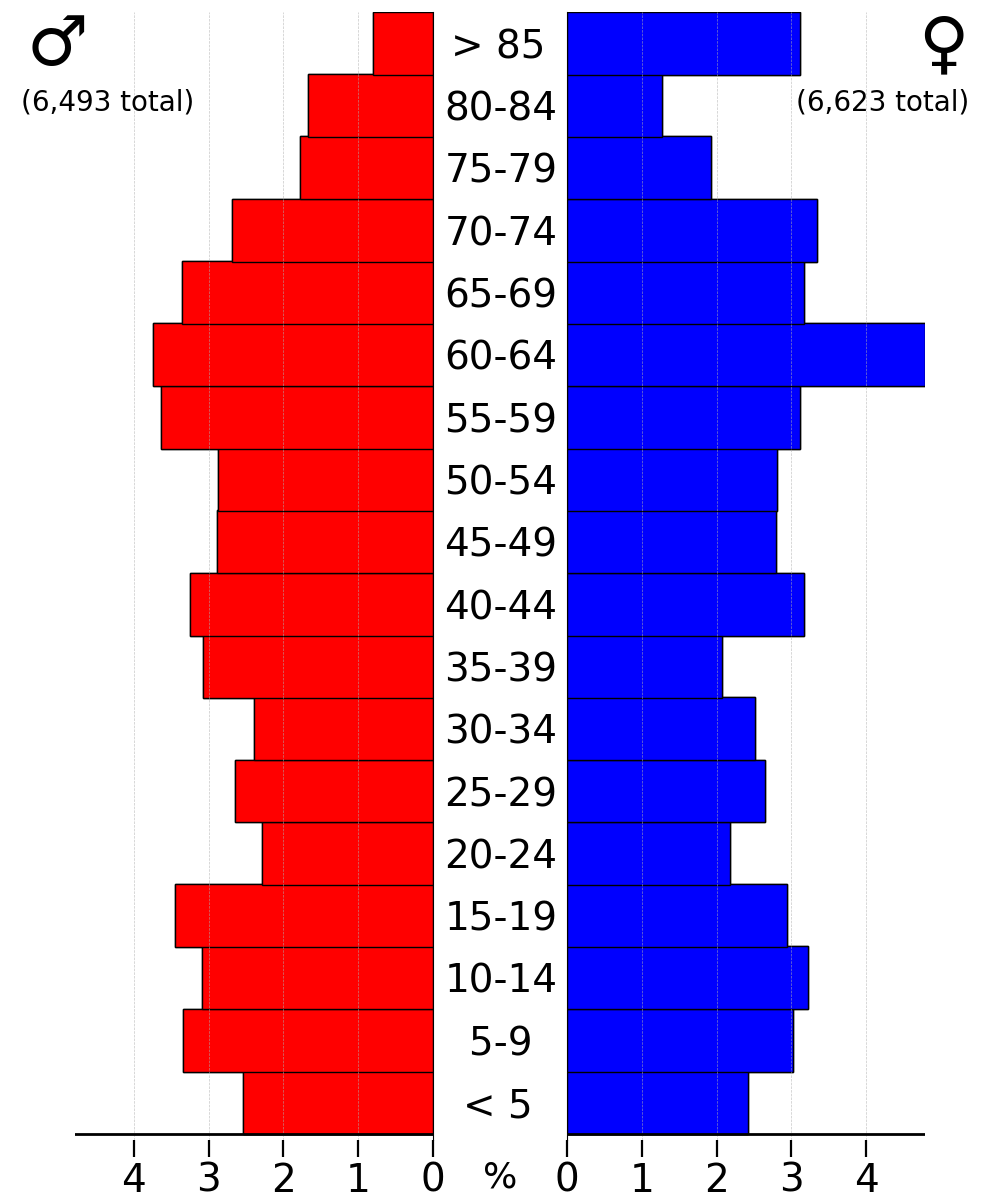
2022 US Census population pyramid for Cass County from ACS 5-year estimates

As of the 2020 census, the county had a population of 13,127 with a population density of 23.3/sq mi (9.0/km^{2}). The median age was 45.5 years, 22.0% of residents were under the age of 18, and 24.1% of residents were 65 years of age or older. For every 100 females there were 95.6 males, and for every 100 females age 18 and over there were 93.4 males age 18 and over.

The racial makeup of the county was 94.6% White, 0.2% Black or African American, 0.2% American Indian and Alaska Native, 0.3% Asian, 0.6% Native Hawaiian and Pacific Islander, 0.9% from some other race, and 3.3% from two or more races. Hispanic or Latino residents of any race comprised 2.3% of the population. 96.75% of the population reported being of one race. 92.23% were non-Hispanic White, 0.22% were Black, 2.33% were Hispanic, 0.19% were Native American, 0.27% were Asian, 0.59% were Native Hawaiian or Pacific Islander and 4.17% were some other race or more than one race.

There were 5,818 households in the county, of which 24.5% had children under the age of 18 living in them. Of all households, 48.1% were married-couple households, 19.0% were households with a male householder and no spouse or partner present, and 26.2% were households with a female householder and no spouse or partner present. About 34.5% of all households were made up of individuals and 17.2% had someone living alone who was 65 years of age or older. There were 6,398 housing units, of which 5,818 were occupied and 9.1% were vacant; of the occupied units, 72.4% were owner-occupied and 27.6% were renter-occupied. The homeowner vacancy rate was 1.6% and the rental vacancy rate was 9.2%.

50.3% of residents lived in urban areas, while 49.7% lived in rural areas.

=== 2010 census ===
The 2010 census recorded a population of 13,956 in the county, with a population density of 24.7/sq mi (9.6/km^{2}). There were 6,591 housing units, of which 5,980 were occupied.

=== 2000 census ===
As of the census of 2000, there were 14,684 people, 6,120 households, and 4,094 families residing in the county. The population density was 26 people per square mile (10 people/km^{2}). There were 6,590 housing units at an average density of 12 units per square mile (4.6 units/km^{2}). The racial makeup of the county was 98.84% White, 0.21% Black or African American, 0.12% Native American, 0.14% Asian, 0.04% Pacific Islander, 0.31% from other races, and 0.34% from two or more races. 0.69% of the population were Hispanic or Latino of any race.

There were 6,120 households, out of which 29.30% had children under the age of 18 living with them, 56.60% were married couples living together, 7.20% had a female householder with no husband present, and 33.10% were non-families. 29.80% of all households were made up of individuals, and 15.90% had someone living alone who was 65 years of age or older. The average household size was 2.32 and the average family size was 2.87.

In the county, the population was spread out, with 23.80% under the age of 18, 6.80% from 18 to 24, 24.80% from 25 to 44, 23.80% from 45 to 64, and 20.80% who were 65 years of age or older. The median age was 42 years. For every 100 females there were 94.30 males. For every 100 females age 18 and over, there were 90.20 males.

The median income for a household in the county was $32,922, and the median income for a family was $40,564. Males had a median income of $29,736 versus $20,108 for females. The per capita income for the county was $17,067. About 7.20% of families and 11.10% of the population were below the poverty line, including 14.40% of those under age 18 and 10.10% of those age 65 or over.

== Notable people ==
- Edwin Perkins, inventor of Kool-Aid
- Ed Podolak, a former running back for Kansas City Chiefs
- Earl Caddock, a champion amateur and pro wrestler of the 1910s and early 1920s.
- Steve H. Hanke, professor of applied economics at Johns Hopkins University, adviser to presidents, currency reformer, and commodity and currency trader

== Communities ==
=== Cities ===
- Anita
- Atlantic
- Cumberland
- Griswold
- Lewis
- Marne
- Massena
- Wiota

=== Townships ===
Cass County is divided into sixteen townships:

- Bear Grove
- Benton
- Brighton
- Cass
- Edna
- Franklin
- Grant
- Grove
- Lincoln
- Massena
- Noble
- Pleasant
- Pymosa
- Union
- Victoria
- Washington

=== Population ranking ===
The population ranking of the following table is based on the 2020 census of Cass County. † county seat

| Rank | City/Town/etc. | Municipal type | Population (2020 Census) |
|---|---|---|---|
| 1 | † Atlantic | City | 6,792 |
| 2 | Griswold | City | 994 |
| 3 | Anita | City | 963 |
| 4 | Massena | City | 359 |
| 5 | Lewis | City | 357 |
| 6 | Cumberland | City | 251 |
| 7 | Marne | City | 110 |
| 8 | Wiota | City | 91 |

== Politics ==
Cass County has historically been one of the most solidly Republican counties in Iowa. The only Democrat ever to win the county was Franklin D. Roosevelt in his 1932 landslide, taking the county by less than 2%. Despite Roosevelt winning by an even larger landslide nationally just four years later, he lost Cass County by more than 13%.

United States presidential election results for Cass County, Iowa
| Year | Republican | | Democratic | | Third party(ies) | |
| Year | No. | % | No. | % | No. | % |
|---|---|---|---|---|---|---|
| 1896 | 2,959 | 56.11% | 2,240 | 42.47% | 75 | 1.42% |
| 1900 | 3,128 | 60.12% | 2,010 | 38.63% | 65 | 1.25% |
| 1904 | 3,050 | 65.55% | 1,394 | 29.96% | 209 | 4.49% |
| 1908 | 2,799 | 61.19% | 1,655 | 36.18% | 120 | 2.62% |
| 1912 | 1,724 | 38.35% | 1,510 | 33.59% | 1,261 | 28.05% |
| 1916 | 2,763 | 59.75% | 1,801 | 38.95% | 60 | 1.30% |
| 1920 | 6,558 | 78.23% | 1,668 | 19.90% | 157 | 1.87% |
| 1924 | 5,721 | 68.70% | 1,099 | 13.20% | 1,508 | 18.11% |
| 1928 | 6,120 | 69.43% | 2,640 | 29.95% | 55 | 0.62% |
| 1932 | 4,215 | 48.76% | 4,339 | 50.19% | 91 | 1.05% |
| 1936 | 5,622 | 56.43% | 4,284 | 43.00% | 56 | 0.56% |
| 1940 | 6,377 | 62.69% | 3,763 | 36.99% | 32 | 0.31% |
| 1944 | 5,610 | 65.53% | 2,928 | 34.20% | 23 | 0.27% |
| 1948 | 5,106 | 59.66% | 3,372 | 39.40% | 81 | 0.95% |
| 1952 | 7,355 | 75.61% | 2,349 | 24.15% | 23 | 0.24% |
| 1956 | 6,103 | 68.34% | 2,818 | 31.56% | 9 | 0.10% |
| 1960 | 6,290 | 67.24% | 3,059 | 32.70% | 5 | 0.05% |
| 1964 | 4,182 | 51.01% | 4,006 | 48.87% | 10 | 0.12% |
| 1968 | 5,223 | 67.30% | 2,136 | 27.52% | 402 | 5.18% |
| 1972 | 5,234 | 72.06% | 1,923 | 26.48% | 106 | 1.46% |
| 1976 | 4,589 | 60.79% | 2,866 | 37.97% | 94 | 1.25% |
| 1980 | 5,391 | 66.34% | 2,176 | 26.78% | 559 | 6.88% |
| 1984 | 5,053 | 67.10% | 2,417 | 32.09% | 61 | 0.81% |
| 1988 | 3,962 | 56.86% | 2,934 | 42.11% | 72 | 1.03% |
| 1992 | 3,176 | 45.00% | 2,231 | 31.61% | 1,651 | 23.39% |
| 1996 | 3,384 | 49.29% | 2,616 | 38.11% | 865 | 12.60% |
| 2000 | 4,206 | 61.13% | 2,481 | 36.06% | 193 | 2.81% |
| 2004 | 4,796 | 63.58% | 2,679 | 35.52% | 68 | 0.90% |
| 2008 | 4,006 | 54.49% | 3,211 | 43.68% | 135 | 1.84% |
| 2012 | 4,217 | 58.53% | 2,858 | 39.67% | 130 | 1.80% |
| 2016 | 4,761 | 66.82% | 1,951 | 27.38% | 413 | 5.80% |
| 2020 | 4,969 | 68.29% | 2,201 | 30.25% | 106 | 1.46% |
| 2024 | 5,007 | 69.38% | 2,077 | 28.78% | 133 | 1.84% |

== See also ==
- National Register of Historic Places listings in Cass County, Iowa
- The Cass County Courthouse Article
