= Massena Township, Cass County, Iowa =

Township in Iowa, US

Massena Township, Cass County
- Township
- Coordinates: 41°17′29″N 094°45′32″W
- Country: United States
- State: Iowa
- County: Cass

Area
  - Total: 35.96 sq mi (93.13 km^{2})
  - Land: 35.90 sq mi (92.97 km^{2})
  - Water: 0.058 sq mi (0.15 km^{2})
- Elevation: 1,380 ft (420 m)

Population (2000)
  - Total: 608
  - Density: 17/sq mi (6.5/km^{2})
- FIPS code: 19-92892
- GNIS feature ID: 0468367

Massena Township is one of sixteen townships in Cass County, Iowa, USA. As of the 2000 census, its population was 608.

== Geography ==
Massena Township covers an area of 35.96 square miles (93.1 km^{2}) and contains one incorporated settlement, Massena. According to the USGS, it contains two cemeteries: Massena and Saint Patricks.
