= Grant Township, Cass County, Iowa =

Township in Iowa, US

Grant Township, Cass County
- Township
- Coordinates: 41°27′32″N 094°45′46″W
- Country: United States
- State: Iowa
- County: Cass

Area
  - Total: 35.69 sq mi (92.43 km^{2})
  - Land: 35.4 sq mi (91.7 km^{2})
  - Water: 0.28 sq mi (0.73 km^{2})
- Elevation: 1,332 ft (406 m)

Population (2000)
  - Total: 1,273
  - Density: 36/sq mi (13.9/km^{2})
- FIPS code: 19-91638
- GNIS feature ID: 0467933

Grant Township is one of sixteen townships in Cass County, Iowa, USA. As of the 2000 census, its population was 1,273.

== Geography ==
Grant Township covers an area of 35.69 square miles (92.4 km^{2}) and contains one incorporated settlement, Anita. According to the USGS, it contains one cemetery, Evergreen.
