= Benton Township, Cass County, Iowa =

Township in Iowa, US

Benton Township, Cass County
- Township
- Coordinates: 41°27′41″N 094°52′17″W
- Country: United States
- State: Iowa
- County: Cass

Area
  - Total: 34.53 sq mi (89.43 km^{2})
  - Land: 34.50 sq mi (89.36 km^{2})
  - Water: 0.027 sq mi (0.07 km^{2})
- Elevation: 1,227 ft (374 m)

Population (2000)
  - Total: 171
  - Density: 4.9/sq mi (1.9/km^{2})
- FIPS code: 19-90204
- GNIS feature ID: 0467441

Benton Township is one of sixteen townships in Cass County, Iowa, United States. As of the 2000 census, its population was 171.

== Geography ==
Benton Township covers an area of 34.53 square miles (89.4 km^{2}) and contains no incorporated settlements. According to the USGS, it contains two cemeteries: Highland and Saint Josephs.
