= Griswold, Iowa =

- City
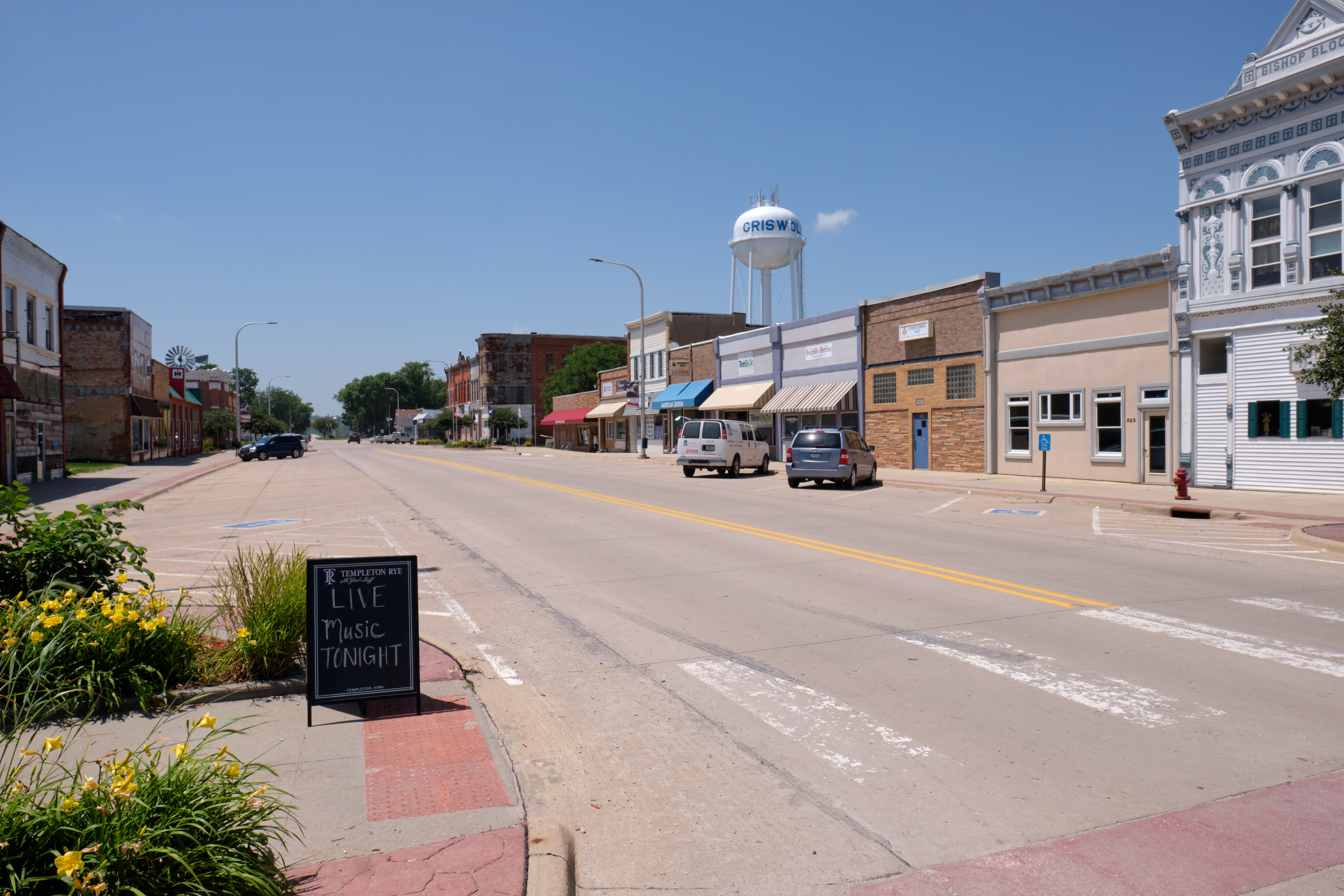
- Downtown Griswold along Tucson Road

- Location of Griswold, Iowa
- Coordinates: 41°14′04″N 95°08′22″W
- Country: USA
- State: Iowa
- County: Cass

Area
  - Total: 0.61 sq mi (1.58 km^{2})
  - Land: 0.61 sq mi (1.58 km^{2})
  - Water: 0 sq mi (0.00 km^{2})
- Elevation: 1,102 ft (336 m)

Population (2020)
  - Total: 994
  - Density: 1,632.1/sq mi (630.15/km^{2})
- Time zone: UTC-6 (Central (CST))
  - Summer (DST): UTC-5 (CDT)
- ZIP code: 51535
- Area code: 712
- FIPS code: 19-33150
- GNIS feature ID: 2394254
- Website: griswoldia.gov

Griswold is a city in Cass County, Iowa, United States. The population was 994 at the time of the 2020 census.

== History ==
The town was named for J. N. A. Griswold, a railroad director.

== Geography ==
According to the United States Census Bureau, the city has a total area of 0.62 square miles (1.61 km^{2}), all land.

== Demographics ==
Historical populations
Year	Pop.	±%
1880	350	—
1890	752	+114.9%
1900	900	+19.7%
1910	949	+5.4%
1920	1,264	+33.2%
1930	1,139	−9.9%
1940	1,132	−0.6%
1950	1,149	+1.5%
1960	1,207	+5.0%
1970	1,181	−2.2%
1980	1,176	−0.4%
1990	1,049	−10.8%
2000	1,039	−1.0%
2010	1,036	−0.3%
2020	994	−4.1%
Source:"U.S. Census website". United States Census Bureau. and Iowa Data Center; Source: U.S. Decennial Census

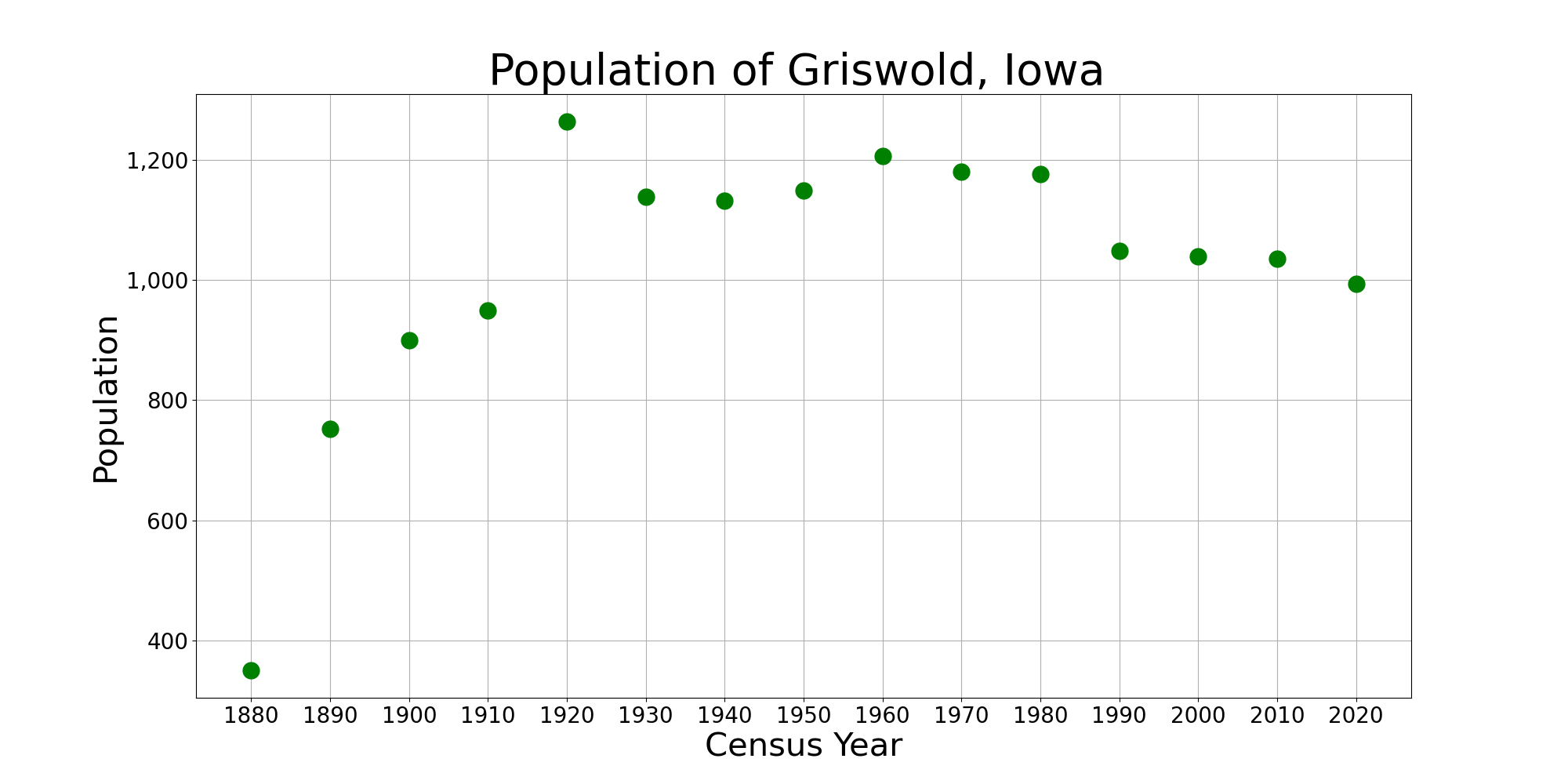
The population of Griswold, Iowa from US census data

=== 2020 census ===
As of the census of 2020, there were 994 people, 433 households, and 251 families residing in the city. The population density was 1,632.1 inhabitants per square mile (630.2/km^{2}). There were 499 housing units at an average density of 819.3 per square mile (316.3/km^{2}). The racial makeup of the city was 93.7% White, 0.3% Black or African American, 0.1% Native American, 0.1% Asian, 0.2% Pacific Islander, 1.1% from other races and 4.5% from two or more races. Hispanic or Latino persons of any race comprised 2.6% of the population.

Of the 433 households, 22.9% of which had children under the age of 18 living with them, 46.0% were married couples living together, 6.2% were cohabitating couples, 29.3% had a female householder with no spouse or partner present and 18.5% had a male householder with no spouse or partner present. 42.0% of all households were non-families. 37.2% of all households were made up of individuals, 20.6% had someone living alone who was 65 years old or older.

The median age in the city was 47.6 years. 22.5% of the residents were under the age of 20; 4.0% were between the ages of 20 and 24; 20.3% were from 25 and 44; 26.2% were from 45 and 64; and 27.0% were 65 years of age or older. The gender makeup of the city was 46.8% male and 53.2% female.

=== 2010 census ===
As of the census of 2010, there were 1,036 people, 445 households, and 278 families living in the city. The population density was 1,671.0 inhabitants per square mile (645.2/km^{2}). There were 507 housing units at an average density of 817.7 per square mile (315.7/km^{2}). The racial makeup of the city was 97.5% White, 1.0% African American, 0.3% Native American, 0.1% Asian, 0.3% from other races, and 0.9% from two or more races. Hispanic or Latino of any race were 1.1% of the population.

There were 445 households, of which 27.9% had children under the age of 18 living with them, 50.1% were married couples living together, 8.3% had a female householder with no husband present, 4.0% had a male householder with no wife present, and 37.5% were non-families. 33.0% of all households were made up of individuals, and 17.7% had someone living alone who was 65 years of age or older. The average household size was 2.25 and the average family size was 2.85.

The median age in the city was 44.9 years. 23.7% of residents were under the age of 18; 5.7% were between the ages of 18 and 24; 20.8% were from 25 to 44; 25.2% were from 45 to 64; and 24.7% were 65 years of age or older. The gender makeup of the city was 45.7% male and 54.3% female.

=== 2000 census ===
As of the census of 2000, there were 1,039 people, 440 households, and 282 families living in the city. The population density was 1,691.0 inhabitants per square mile (652.9/km^{2}). There were 491 housing units at an average density of 799.1 per square mile (308.5/km^{2}). The racial makeup of the city was 99.04% White, 0.19% Native American, 0.10% Pacific Islander, 0.38% from other races, and 0.29% from two or more races. Hispanic or Latino of any race were 1.35% of the population.

There were 440 households, out of which 25.7% had children under the age of 18 living with them, 54.3% were married couples living together, 6.1% had a female householder with no husband present, and 35.9% were non-families. 31.4% of all households were made up of individuals, and 18.6% had someone living alone who was 65 years of age or older. The average household size was 2.24 and the average family size was 2.82.

21.6% are under the age of 18, 5.6% from 18 to 24, 23.5% from 25 to 44, 21.8% from 45 to 64, and 27.5% who were 65 years of age or older. The median age was 45 years. For every 100 females, there were 86.5 males. For every 100 females age 18 and over, there were 85.2 males.

The median income for a household in the city was $31,538, and the median income for a family was $38,125. Males had a median income of $27,667 versus $18,542 for females. The per capita income for the city was $16,430. About 5.5% of families and 6.6% of the population were below the poverty line, including 8.2% of those under age 18 and 9.4% of those age 65 or over.

== Education ==
The Griswold Community School District operates area public schools.

== Notable people ==
- Neville Brand — television and movie actor
- Guy Lowman - college basketball, football and baseball coach
