= Kool-Aid =

Flavored drink mix

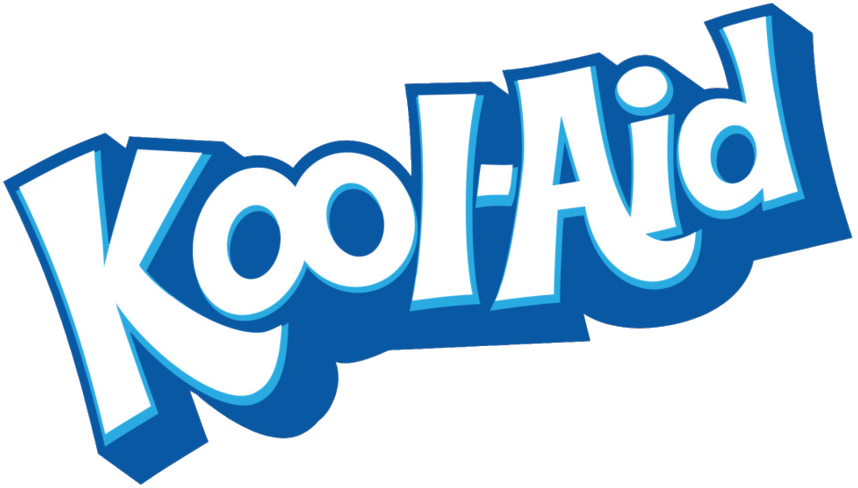
- Product type: Drink mix
- Current owner: Kraft Heinz
- Country: United States
- Introduced: August 13, 1927; 99 years ago
- Markets: Worldwide
- Website: koolaid.com

Kool-Aid is an American brand of flavored drink mix owned by Kraft Heinz based in Chicago, Illinois. The powder form was created by Edwin Perkins in 1927 based upon a liquid concentrate named Fruit Smack.

== History ==
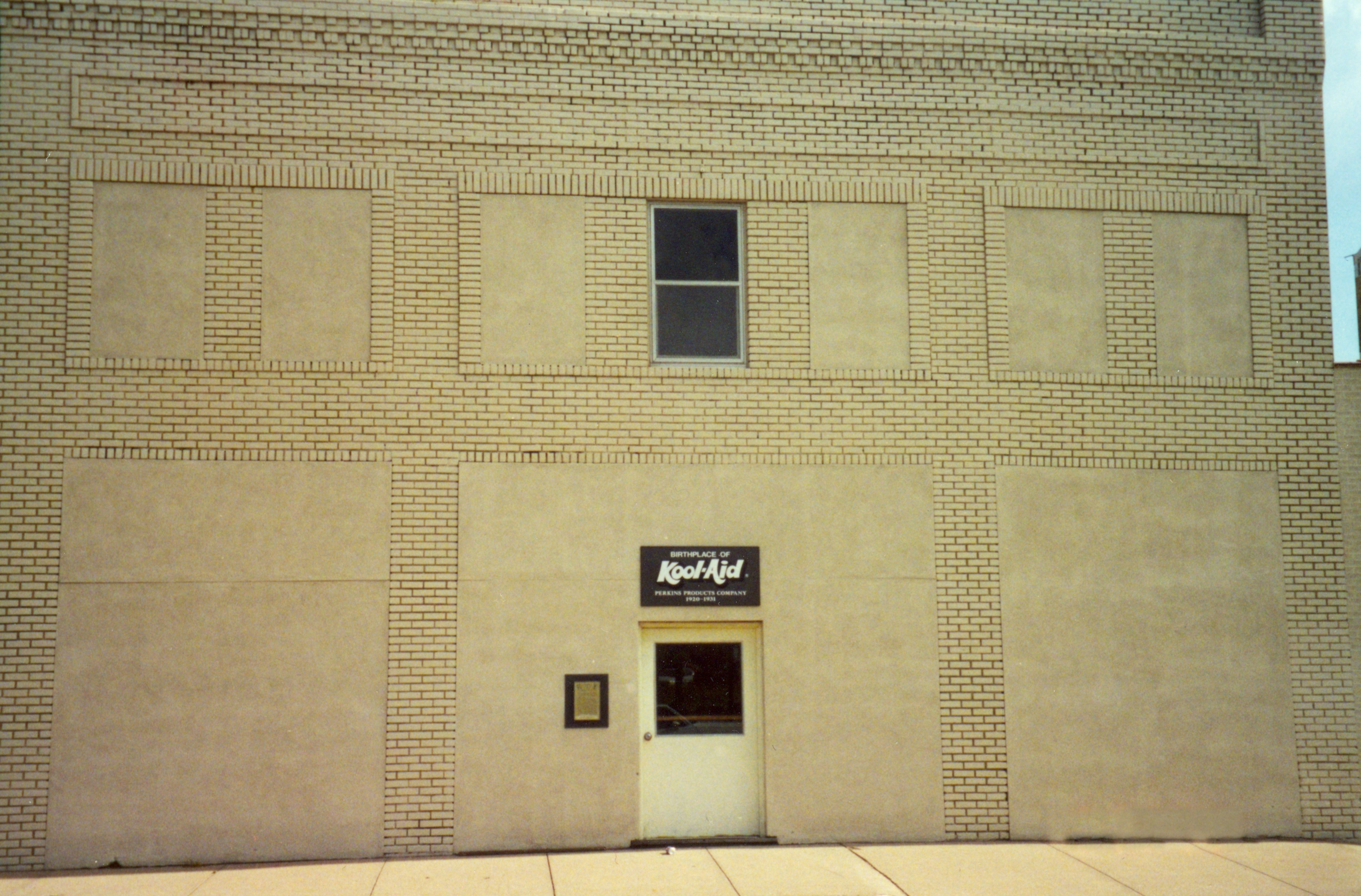
The building in Hastings, Nebraska, where Kool-Aid was invented

Kool-Aid was invented by Edwin Perkins in Hastings, Nebraska. All of his experiments took place in his mother's kitchen. Its predecessor was a liquid concentrate called Fruit Smack. To reduce shipping costs, in 1927, Perkins discovered a way to remove the liquid from Fruit Smack, leaving only a powder; this powder was named Kool-Aid. Perkins moved his production to Chicago in 1931 and Kool-Aid was sold to General Foods in 1953. Hastings still celebrates a yearly summer festival called Kool-Aid Days on the second weekend in August in honor of their city's claim to fame. Kool-Aid is known as Nebraska's official soft drink.

An agreement between Kraft Foods and SodaStream in 2012 made Kool-Aid's various flavors available for consumer purchases and use with SodaStream's home soda maker machine.

There is an active scene of Kool-Aid collectors. A rare old Kool-Aid package can be traded for up to several hundred dollars on auction websites.

The colors in Kool-Aid will stain, and hence the drink mix has been used as a dye for either hair or wool.

== Production ==
Kool-Aid is usually sold in powder form, in either packets or small tubs. It is prepared by mixing the powder with sugar (the packets of powder are usually, though not always, unsweetened) and water, typically by the pitcherful. The drink is usually either served with ice or refrigerated and served chilled. Additionally, there are some sugar-free varieties.

Kool-Aid is also sold as single-serving packets designed to be poured into bottled water, as small plastic bottles with pre-mixed drink, or as such novelties as ice cream or fizzing tablets.

== Advertising and promotion ==
The Kool-Aid Man, an anthropomorphic pitcher filled with Kool-Aid, is the mascot of Kool-Aid. The character was introduced shortly after General Foods acquired the brand in the 1950s. In television and print ads, the Kool-Aid Man was known for randomly bursting through walls of children's homes and proceeding to make a batch of Kool-Aid for them. His catchphrase is "Oh, yeah!" In 2013, Kraft decided to overhaul the Kool-Aid Man, reimagining him as a CGI character, "a celebrity trying to show that he's just an ordinary guy."

Starting in 2011, Kraft began allocating the majority of the Kool-Aid marketing budget towards Latinos. According to the brand, almost 20 percent of Kool-Aid drinkers are Hispanic, and slightly more than 20 percent are African-American.

== Flavors ==
Original 6 flavors	Cherry, Grape, Lemon-Lime, Orange, Raspberry, Strawberry
Singles flavors	Black Cherry, Tropical Punch, Lemonade, Pink Lemonade, Cherry, Watermelon, Orange, Summer Punch
Sugar-free flavors	Cherry, Grape, Lemonade, Soarin' Strawberry Lemonade, Tropical Punch, Raspberry, Watermelon, KiwiLime
Water flavors	Jamaica, Mandarina-Tangerine, Mango, Tamarindo, Piña-Pineapple
Other flavors worldwide or previously available	Apple, Arctic Green Apple, Berry Blue, Bunch Berry, Blastin' Berry Cherry, Blue Berry Blast, Blue Moon Berry, Candy Apple, Cherry, Cherry Cracker, Chocolate, Cola, Eerie Orange, Frutas, Vermelhas, Golden Nectar, Grape, Grape Blackberry, Grape Tang, Melon Mango, Strawberry Splash, Great Blueberry, Great Blue-dini, Groselha, Guaraná, Ice Blue Raspberry Lemonade, Incrediberry, Kickin-Kiwi-Lime, Kolita, Lemon, Lemon Ice, Lemonade, Lemonade Sparkle, Lemon-Lime, Lime, Man-o-Mangoberry, Mango, Mountainberry Punch, Oh-Yeah Orange-Pineapple, Orange, Orange Enerjooz, Peach, Pina-Pineapple, Pink Lemonade, Pink Swimmingo, Purplesaurus Rex, Rainbow Punch, Raspberry, Roarin' Raspberry Cranberry, Rock-a-Dile Red, Root Beer, Scary Black Cherry, Scary Blackberry, Shaking Starfruit, Sharkleberry Fin, Slammin' Strawberry-Kiwi, Soarin' Strawberry-Lemonade, Solar Strawberry-Starfruit, Strawberry, Strawberry Falls Punch, Strawberry Split, Strawberry-Raspberry, Sunshine Punch, Surfin' Berry Punch, Swirlin' Strawberry-Starfruit, Tangerine, Tropical Punch, Watermelon, Watermelon-Cherry

== "Drinking the Kool-Aid" ==
"Drinking the Kool-Aid" is a phrase suggesting that one has mindlessly adopted a dogma of a group or a (cult) leader without fully understanding the ramifications or implications. The backdrop of this are events culminating in the 1978 Jonestown Massacre. At Jonestown, Guyana, followers of Jim Jones' Temple drank from a metal vat containing a mixture of "Kool Aid," cyanide, and the prescription drugs Valium, Phenergan, and chloral hydrate. Present-day descriptions of the event sometimes claim the beverage was not Kool-Aid, but Flavor Aid, a less-expensive product from Jel Sert reportedly found at the site. Kraft Foods, the creator of Kool-Aid, has stated the same. Implied by this accounting of events is that the reference to the Kool-Aid brand owes exclusively to its being better-known among Americans. Others are less categorical. Both brands are known to have been among the commune's supplies: Film footage shot inside the compound prior to the events of November shows Jones opening a large chest in which boxes of both Flavor Aid and Kool-Aid are visible. Criminal investigators testifying at the Jonestown inquest spoke of finding packets of "cool aid" (sic), and eyewitnesses to the incident are also recorded as speaking of "cool aid" or "Cool Aid." However, it is unclear whether they intended to refer to the actual Kool-Aid–brand drink or were using the name in a generic sense that might refer to any powdered flavored beverage.

== Relation to LSD ==
There have been multiple documented instances of Kool-Aid being spiked with the psychedelic drug lysergic acid diethylamide. Most notable of these was during Project MKUltra, in which subjects would be given Kool-Aid that was spiked with LSD, before being brainwashed and psychologically tortured.

Ken Kesey and the Merry Pranksters frequently held and advertised parties they called the Acid Tests, during which they gave out Kool-Aid that was laced with LSD. Tom Wolfe later wrote about these parties in his book The Electric Kool-Aid Acid Test.

== In popular culture ==
In the 2025 television series The Studio, a main fictional film project centers on Kool-Aid and its Kool-Aid Man mascot.
