= Lewis, Iowa =

- City
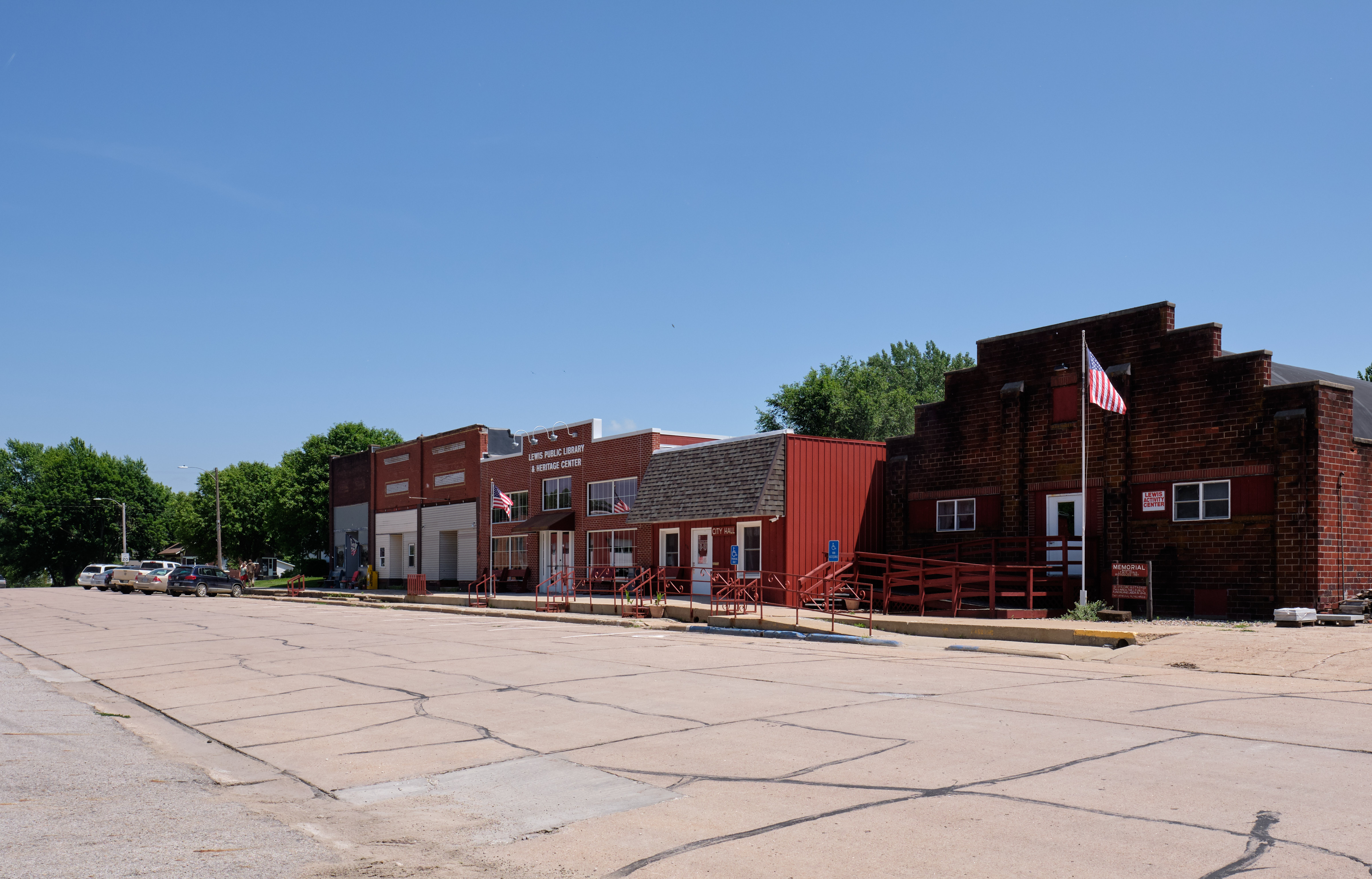
- Businesses along West Main Street in downtown Lewis

- Location of Lewis, Iowa
- Coordinates: 41°18′23″N 95°05′03″W
- Country: USA
- State: Iowa
- County: Cass

Area
  - Total: 0.51 sq mi (1.31 km^{2})
  - Land: 0.51 sq mi (1.31 km^{2})
  - Water: 0 sq mi (0.00 km^{2})
- Elevation: 1,168 ft (356 m)

Population (2020)
  - Total: 357
  - Density: 706.2/sq mi (272.68/km^{2})
- Time zone: UTC-6 (Central (CST))
  - Summer (DST): UTC-5 (CDT)
- ZIP code: 51544
- Area code: 712
- FIPS code: 19-44805
- GNIS feature ID: 2395690

Lewis is a city in Cass County, Iowa, United States, along the East Nishnabotna River. The population was 357 at the time of the 2020 census.

== Geography ==
According to the United States Census Bureau, the city has a total area of 0.50 square miles (1.29 km^{2}), all land.

== Demographics ==
Historical populations
Year	Pop.	±%
1870	400	—
1880	550	+37.5%
1890	579	+5.3%
1900	613	+5.9%
1910	603	−1.6%
1920	607	+0.7%
1930	589	−3.0%
1940	557	−5.4%
1950	511	−8.3%
1960	501	−2.0%
1970	526	+5.0%
1980	497	−5.5%
1990	433	−12.9%
2000	438	+1.2%
2010	433	−1.1%
2020	357	−17.6%
Source:"U.S. Census website". United States Census Bureau. and Iowa Data Center; Source: U.S. Decennial Census

=== 2020 census ===
As of the census of 2020, there were 357 people, 168 households, and 96 families residing in the city. The population density was 706.2 inhabitants per square mile (272.7/km^{2}). There were 188 housing units at an average density of 371.9 per square mile (143.6/km^{2}). The racial makeup of the city was 95.2% White, 0.0% Black or African American, 0.3% Native American, 0.0% Asian, 0.0% Pacific Islander, 1.4% from other races and 3.1% from two or more races. Hispanic or Latino persons of any race comprised 3.9% of the population.

Of the 168 households, 22.0% of which had children under the age of 18 living with them, 42.3% were married couples living together, 8.3% were cohabitating couples, 25.6% had a female householder with no spouse or partner present and 23.8% had a male householder with no spouse or partner present. 42.9% of all households were non-families. 38.1% of all households were made up of individuals, 25.6% had someone living alone who was 65 years old or older.

The median age in the city was 47.5 years. 23.5% of the residents were under the age of 20; 3.9% were between the ages of 20 and 24; 19.9% were from 25 and 44; 27.5% were from 45 and 64; and 25.2% were 65 years of age or older. The gender makeup of the city was 50.4% male and 49.6% female.

=== 2010 census ===
As of the census of 2010, there were 433 people, 183 households, and 119 families living in the city. The population density was 866.0 inhabitants per square mile (334.4/km^{2}). There were 200 housing units at an average density of 400.0 per square mile (154.4/km^{2}). The racial makeup of the city was 96.8% White, 1.2% Native American, 0.2% from other races, and 1.8% from two or more races. Hispanic or Latino of any race were 1.4% of the population.

There were 183 households, of which 26.2% had children under the age of 18 living with them, 50.3% were married couples living together, 9.3% had a female householder with no husband present, 5.5% had a male householder with no wife present, and 35.0% were non-families. 28.4% of all households were made up of individuals, and 13.1% had someone living alone who was 65 years of age or older. The average household size was 2.37 and the average family size was 2.83.

The median age in the city was 45.8 years. 23.1% of residents were under the age of 18; 6.4% were between the ages of 18 and 24; 18.1% were from 25 to 44; 37.2% were from 45 to 64; and 15.2% were 65 years of age or older. The gender makeup of the city was 50.3% male and 49.7% female.

=== 2000 census ===
As of the census of 2000, there were 438 people, 190 households, and 128 families living in the city. The population density was 876.0 inhabitants per square mile (338.2/km^{2}). There were 196 housing units at an average density of 392.0 per square mile (151.4/km^{2}). The racial makeup of the city was 99.32% White, 0.23% Native American, 0.23% from other races, and 0.23% from two or more races. Hispanic or Latino of any race were 0.23% of the population.

There were 190 households, out of which 31.6% had children under the age of 18 living with them, 55.8% were married couples living together, 7.9% had a female householder with no husband present, and 32.6% were non-families. 31.1% of all households were made up of individuals, and 19.5% had someone living alone who was 65 years of age or older. The average household size was 2.31 and the average family size was 2.85.

In the city, the population was spread out, with 25.6% under the age of 18, 4.1% from 18 to 24, 24.0% from 25 to 44, 28.5% from 45 to 64, and 17.8% who were 65 years of age or older. The median age was 42 years. For every 100 females, there were 95.5 males. For every 100 females age 18 and over, there were 90.6 males.

The median income for a household in the city was $30,114, and the median income for a family was $36,563. Males had a median income of $29,219 versus $19,917 for females. The per capita income for the city was $14,316. About 5.5% of families and 8.2% of the population were below the poverty line, including 8.7% of those under age 18 and 10.1% of those age 65 or over.

== Education ==
The Griswold Community School District operates area public schools.

== Notable person ==
- Edwin Perkins, inventor of Kool-Aid
