= Wiota, Iowa =

- City
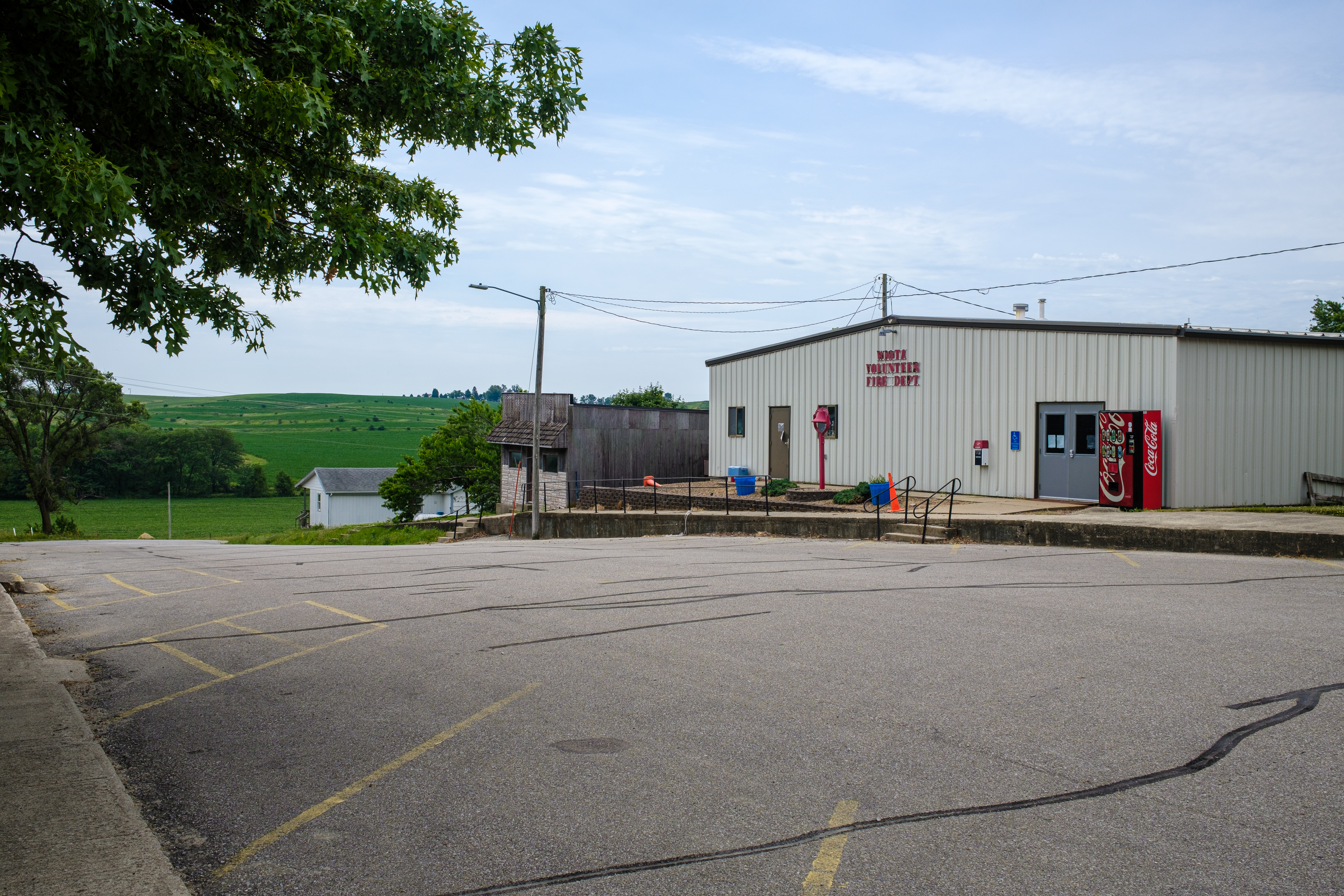
- Looking southeast on Center Street

- Location of Wiota, Iowa
- Coordinates: 41°24′03″N 94°53′14″W
- Country: USA
- State: Iowa
- County: Cass

Area
  - Total: 0.30 sq mi (0.77 km^{2})
  - Land: 0.30 sq mi (0.77 km^{2})
  - Water: 0 sq mi (0.00 km^{2})
- Elevation: 1,243 ft (379 m)

Population (2020)
  - Total: 91
  - Density: 304.5/sq mi (117.57/km^{2})
- Time zone: UTC-6 (Central (CST))
  - Summer (DST): UTC-5 (CDT)
- ZIP code: 50274
- Area code: 712
- FIPS code: 19-86610
- GNIS feature ID: 2397355

Wiota is a city in Cass County, Iowa, United States. The population was 91 at the time of the 2020 census.

== Geography ==
According to the United States Census Bureau, the city has a total area of 0.32 square miles (0.83 km^{2}), all land.

== Demographics ==
Historical populations
Year	Pop.	±%
1880	110	—
1890	168	+52.7%
1900	218	+29.8%
1910	239	+9.6%
1920	199	−16.7%
1930	225	+13.1%
1940	246	+9.3%
1950	227	−7.7%
1960	195	−14.1%
1970	171	−12.3%
1980	181	+5.8%
1990	160	−11.6%
2000	149	−6.9%
2010	116	−22.1%
2020	91	−21.6%
Source:"U.S. Census website". United States Census Bureau. and Iowa Data Center; Source: U.S. Decennial Census

=== 2020 census ===
As of the 2020 Census, the total population was 91 people. The population density was 284.3 people per square mile, spread over 0.32 miles. Of those 91 people, the median age was 67.8 years old, with no one under the age of 18, 42.5% between the ages of 18 and 64, and 57.5% of the population over the age of 65. There were a total of 51 households, with an average of 1.92 people per household.

52% of the town's population was male, with 48% of the population female. The racial makeup of the town was 97.8% White and the remaining 2.2% were Hispanic.

The average income per capita of Wiota was $35,568, which is higher than the state average, and the median household income was $63,466 slightly higher than the rest of the state. With no poverty in the town.

83.9% of the population of the town is identified as currently married.

98.9% of the Wiota population has received a high school degree, which is 6.3 percentage points higher than the rest of the state. Wiota has a lower-than-average percentage of the population having received college degrees, with only 10.5% of the town's population having received a bachelor’s degree compared to the state average of 30.5%.

23% of the town's population were veterans.

=== 2010 census ===
As of the census of 2010, there were 116 people, 59 households, and 35 families living in the city. The population density was 362.5 inhabitants per square mile (140.0/km^{2}). There were 78 housing units at an average density of 243.8 per square mile (94.1/km^{2}). The racial makeup of the city was 99.1% White and 0.9% from two or more races.

There were 59 households, of which 13.6% had children under the age of 18 living with them, 45.8% were married couples living together, 5.1% had a female householder with no husband present, 8.5% had a male householder with no wife present, and 40.7% were non-families. 33.9% of all households were made up of individuals, and 10.2% had someone living alone who was 65 years of age or older. The average household size was 1.97 and the average family size was 2.37.

The median age in the city was 50 years. 12.1% of residents were under the age of 18; 5.9% were between the ages of 18 and 24; 17.2% were from 25 to 44; 40.6% were from 45 to 64; and 24.1% were 65 years of age or older. The gender makeup of the city was 57.8% male and 42.2% female.

=== 2000 census ===
As of the census of 2000, there were 149 people, 67 households, and 44 families living in the city. The population density was 469.6 inhabitants per square mile (181.3/km^{2}). There were 80 housing units at an average density of 252.1 per square mile (97.3/km^{2}). The racial makeup of the city was 100.00% White.

There were 67 households, out of which 29.9% had children under the age of 18 living with them, 47.8% were married couples living together, 9.0% had a female householder with no husband present, and 34.3% were non-families. 26.9% of all households were made up of individuals, and 11.9% had someone living alone who was 65 years of age or older. The average household size was 2.22 and the average family size was 2.59.

In the city, the population was spread out, with 22.1% under the age of 18, 8.7% from 18 to 24, 28.9% from 25 to 44, 26.2% from 45 to 64, and 14.1% who were 65 years of age or older. The median age was 39 years. For every 100 females, there were 125.8 males. For every 100 females age 18 and over, there were 118.9 males.

The median income for a household in the city was $29,167, and the median income for a family was $28,750. Males had a median income of $20,250 versus $19,792 for females. The per capita income for the city was $15,994. There were 16.3% of families and 20.3% of the population living below the poverty line, including 29.6% of under eighteens and none of those over 64.

== Education ==
The community is in the CAM Community School District. It was a part of the Anita Community School District, until it merged into CAM on July 1, 2011. Wiota joined Anita in 1961. For most of their existence, the colors were Blue and White and were known as the Little Giants. In the 1940s and 1950s, they were The Blue Racers. The last 5 years the colors were black and white and were known as the Panthers. They won the Iowa State Baseball championship in 1944 and the Iowa Women’s State Basketball championship in back-to-back years; 1944 & 1945.
