= Anita, Iowa =

- City
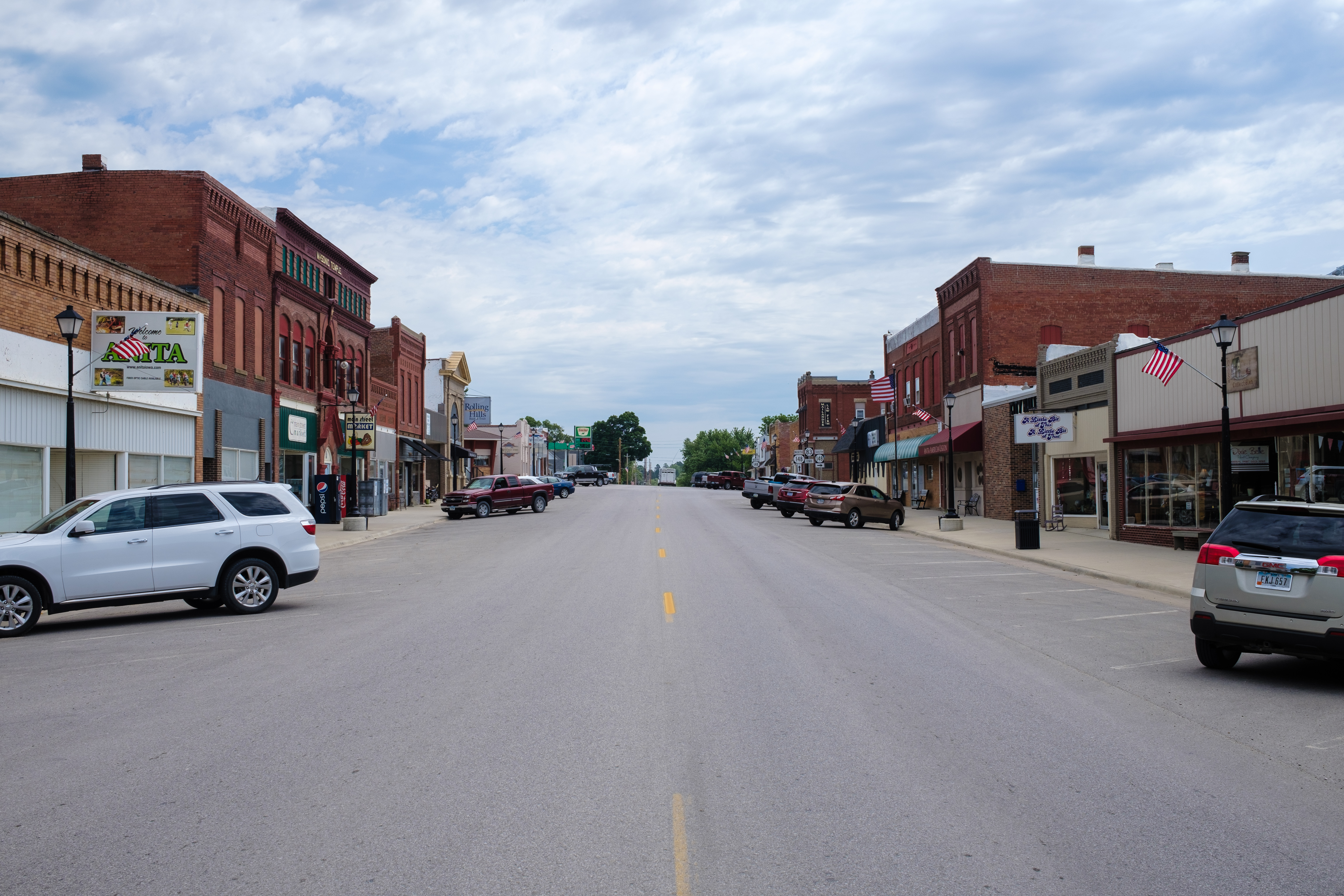
- A view down White Pole Road

- Location of Anita, Iowa
- Coordinates: 41°26′37″N 94°45′57″W
- Country: US
- State: Iowa
- County: Cass
- Incorporated: May 19, 1875

Area
  - Total: 1.78 sq mi (4.60 km^{2})
  - Land: 1.78 sq mi (4.60 km^{2})
  - Water: 0 sq mi (0.00 km^{2})
- Elevation: 1,263 ft (385 m)

Population (2020)
  - Total: 963
  - Density: 542.5/sq mi (209.47/km^{2})
- Time zone: UTC-6 (Central (CST))
  - Summer (DST): UTC-5 (CDT)
- ZIP code: 50020
- Area code: 712
- FIPS code: 19-02260
- GNIS feature ID: 2393959
- Website: www.anitaiowa.com

Anita is a city in Cass County, Iowa, United States, platted in 1869 and incorporated in 1875. The population was 963 at the 2020 census. Lake Anita State Park is located just outside the town.

== History ==
A violent F5 tornado occurred just east of the town on June 27, 1953. One person was killed and two others were injured.

== Geography ==
Anita is located at 41°26′48″N 94°45′56″W.

According to the United States Census Bureau, the city has a total area of 1.70 square miles (4.40 km^{2}), all land. Anita's motto is "A Whale of a Town."

== Demographics ==
Historical populations
Year	Pop.	±%
1880	479	—
1890	695	+45.1%
1900	968	+39.3%
1910	1,118	+15.5%
1920	1,236	+10.6%
1930	1,106	−10.5%
1940	1,088	−1.6%
1950	1,112	+2.2%
1960	1,233	+10.9%
1970	1,101	−10.7%
1980	1,153	+4.7%
1990	1,068	−7.4%
2000	1,049	−1.8%
2010	972	−7.3%
2020	963	−0.9%
Source:"U.S. Census website". United States Census Bureau. and Iowa Data Center; Source: U.S. Decennial Census

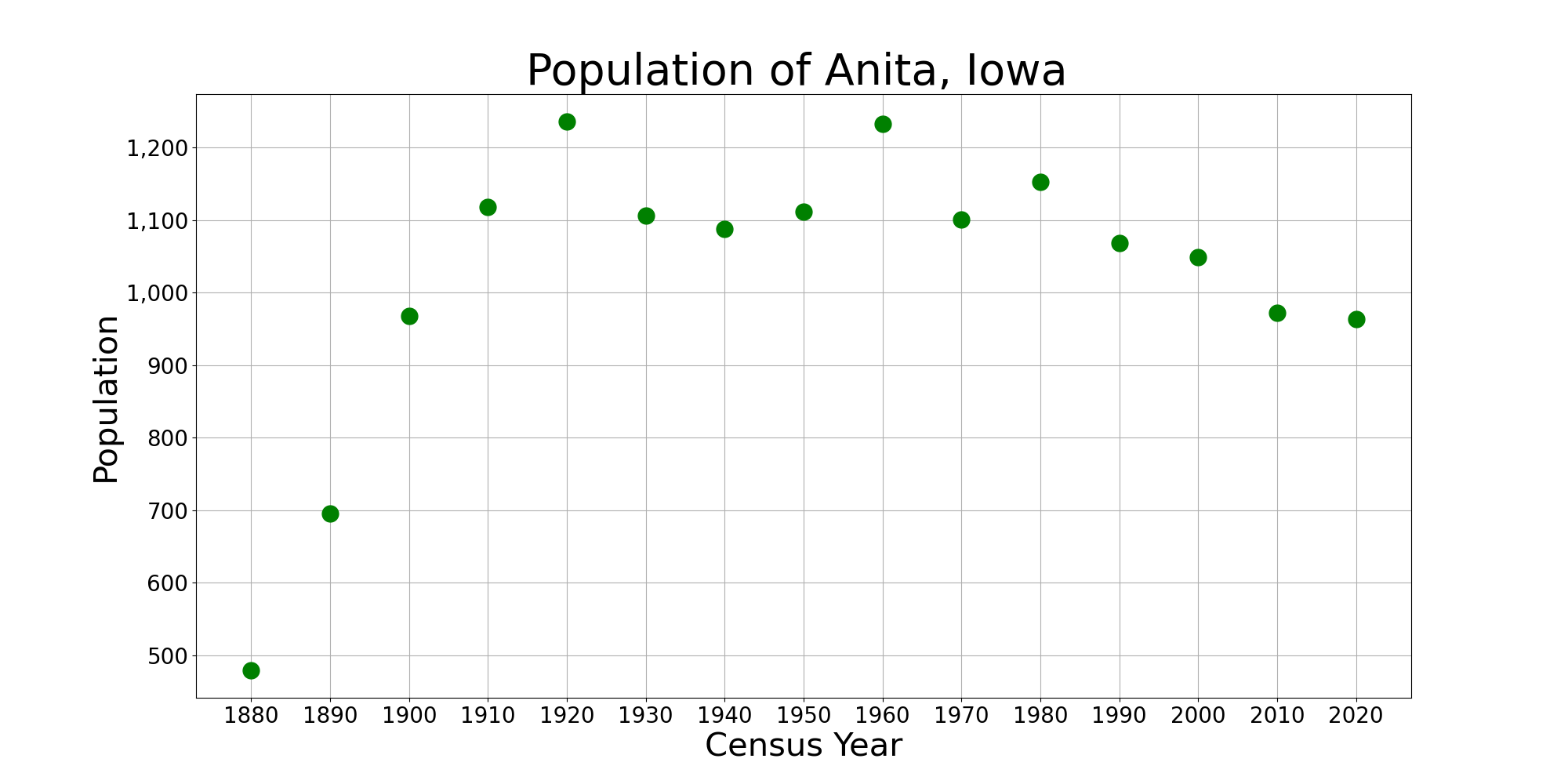
The population of Anita, Iowa from US census data

=== 2020 census ===
As of the census of 2020, there were 963 people, 430 households, and 253 families residing in the city. The population density was 542.5 inhabitants per square mile (209.5/km^{2}). There were 471 housing units at an average density of 265.3 per square mile (102.5/km^{2}). The racial makeup of the city was 96.2% White, 0.1% Black or African American, 0.1% Native American, 0.2% Asian, 0.5% Pacific Islander, 0.4% from other races and 2.5% from two or more races. Hispanic or Latino persons of any race comprised 0.7% of the population.

Of the 430 households, 24.4% of which had children under the age of 18 living with them, 45.8% were married couples living together, 9.3% were cohabitating couples, 25.1% had a female householder with no spouse or partner present and 19.8% had a male householder with no spouse or partner present. 41.2% of all households were non-families. 36.3% of all households were made up of individuals, 15.8% had someone living alone who was 65 years old or older.

The median age in the city was 45.7 years. 22.6% of the residents were under the age of 20; 3.4% were between the ages of 20 and 24; 22.3% were from 25 and 44; 24.9% were from 45 and 64; and 26.7% were 65 years of age or older. The gender makeup of the city was 48.4% male and 51.6% female.

=== 2010 census ===
As of the census of 2010, there were 972 people, 427 households, and 266 families living in the city. The population density was 571.8 inhabitants per square mile (220.8/km^{2}). There were 488 housing units at an average density of 287.1 per square mile (110.8/km^{2}). The racial makeup of the city was 99.5% White, 0.2% Asian, 0.1% from other races, and 0.2% from two or more races. Hispanic or Latino of any race were 0.6% of the population.

There were 427 households, of which 25.3% had children under the age of 18 living with them, 46.8% were married couples living together, 11.0% had a female householder with no husband present, 4.4% had a male householder with no wife present, and 37.7% were non-families. 32.6% of all households were made up of individuals, and 13.8% had someone living alone who was 65 years of age or older. The average household size was 2.19 and the average family size was 2.72.

The median age in the city was 47.4 years. 20.9% of residents were under the age of 18; 6.3% were between the ages of 18 and 24; 18.6% were from 25 to 44; 30.6% were from 45 to 64; and 23.4% were 65 years of age or older. The gender makeup of the city was 49.8% male and 50.2% female.

=== 2000 census ===
As of the census of 2000, there were 1,049 people, 454 households, and 285 families living in the city. The population density was 612.1 inhabitants per square mile (236.3/km^{2}). There were 492 housing units at an average density of 287.1 per square mile (110.8/km^{2}). The racial makeup of the city was 99.24% White, 0.19% Native American, 0.10% Asian, and 0.48% from two or more races. Hispanic or Latino of any race were 0.48% of the population.

There were 454 households, out of which 26.4% had children under the age of 18 living with them, 51.1% were married couples living together, 9.3% had a female householder with no husband present, and 37.2% were non-families. 33.7% of all households were made up of individuals, and 19.2% had someone living alone who was 65 years of age or older. The average household size was 2.21 and the average family size was 2.81.

In the city, the population was spread out, with 21.5% under the age of 18, 6.9% from 18 to 24, 24.0% from 25 to 44, 22.0% from 45 to 64, and 25.5% who were 65 years of age or older. The median age was 44 years. For every 100 females, there were 92.1 males. For every 100 females age 18 and over, there were 83.3 males.

The median income for a household in the city was $28,984, and the median income for a family was $42,578. Males had a median income of $28,393 versus $20,223 for females. The per capita income for the city was $15,672. About 5.5% of families and 8.1% of the population were below the poverty line, including 8.9% of those under age 18 and 10.5% of those age 65 or over.

== Education ==
The community is in the CAM Community School District. It was a part of the Anita Community School District until it merged into CAM on July 1, 2011.

== Notable people ==
- Stuart Sherman, Early 20th-century literary critic and journalist
