= National Register of Historic Places listings in Cass County, Iowa =

Location of Cass County in Iowa

Cass County, Iowa, United States, has 11 properties listed on the National Register of Historic Places, including one National Historic Landmark. Latitude and longitude coordinates are provided for many National Register properties and districts; these locations may be seen together in a map.

This National Park Service list is complete through NPS recent listings posted December 19, 2025.

	Name on the Register	Image	Date listed	Location	City or town	Description
1	American Legion Memorial Building	American Legion Memorial Building	December 12, 2006 (#06001121)	201 Poplar St. 41°24′32″N 95°00′50″W	Atlantic	
2	Atlantic High School	Atlantic High School	October 24, 2002 (#02001248)	1100 Linn St. 41°23′58″N 95°00′25″W	Atlantic	
3	Cass County Court House	Cass County Court House	August 28, 2003 (#03000819)	5 W. 7th St. 41°24′12″N 95°00′52″W	Atlantic	
4	Charles F. and Ruth Chase House	Charles F. and Ruth Chase House	April 15, 1999 (#99000451)	110 W. 9th St. 41°24′08″N 95°00′54″W	Atlantic	
5	Chicago, Rock Island & Pacific Railroad Depot	Chicago, Rock Island & Pacific Railroad Depot	February 23, 1994 (#94000087)	Junction of 1st and Chesnut Sts. 41°24′36″N 95°00′46″W	Atlantic	
6	Griswold National Bank	Griswold National Bank	February 22, 1979 (#79003695)	Main and Cass; 41°14′04″N 95°08′34″W	Griswold	
7	George B. Hitchcock House	George B. Hitchcock House	November 9, 1977 (#77000500)	63788 567th Lane; 41°18′11″N 95°06′12″W	Lewis	
8	Hotel Whitney	Hotel Whitney	September 19, 2016 (#16000640)	222 Chestnut St. 41°24′32″N 95°00′47″W	Atlantic	
9	S. F. Martin House	S. F. Martin House	January 12, 1984 (#84001211)	419 Poplar St. 41°24′23″N 95°00′09″W	Atlantic	
10	Job A. and Rebecca E. McWaid House	Job A. and Rebecca E. McWaid House	September 9, 1994 (#94001030)	702 E. 4th St. 41°24′25″N 95°00′05″W	Atlantic	
11	Nishnabotna Ferry House	Nishnabotna Ferry House	January 26, 2001 (#00001676)	W. Minnesota St. 41°18′30″N 95°05′38″W	Lewis	

== See also ==
- List of National Historic Landmarks in Iowa
- National Register of Historic Places listings in Iowa
- Listings in neighboring counties: Adair, Adams, Audubon, Montgomery, Pottawattamie, Shelby
