= ACSD =

ACSD may refer to:

- Allamakee Community School District
- Amite County School District
- Anamosa Community School District
- Arlington Central School District
- Association of Christians in Student Development
- Atlantic Community School District
