= M. O. Smith =

American football player and coach

Biographical details
- Born: September 1, 1880; Illinois, U.S.
- Died: October 13, 1935 (aged 55); Council Bluffs, Iowa, U.S.
- Education: Grinnell College

Coaching career (HC unless noted)
- 1903: Doane

Head coaching record
- Overall: 2–1

Milo Oscar Smith (September 1, 1880 – October 13, 1935) was an American football player and coach.

Smith played football as an end and quarterback at Grinnell College, and was remembered as "one of the greatest football stars at Grinnell." He also served as the coach of Grinnell's second team.

He served as the ninth head football coach at Doane College in Crete, Nebraska and he held that position for the 1903 season. His coaching record at Doane was 2–1.

On July 7, 1905, Smith married Mary Ella Porterfield in Atlantic, Iowa. By 1905 the couple was living in Council Bluffs, where Smith worked for a clothing store.

In July 1909, Smith was hired as a history teacher, football coach, and athletic director at Rock Island High School in Rock Island, Illinois. However, he resigned one month later in order to take a position in business.

Smith died in 1935 in Council Bluffs, Iowa.

== Head coaching record ==
Year	Team	Overall	Conference	Standing	Bowl/playoffs
Doane Tigers (Independent) (1903)
1903	Doane	2–1			
Doane:		2–1			
Total:		2–1			
