= Atlantic High School =

Atlantic High School may refer to:

== In the United States ==
- Atlantic Community High School, Delray Beach, Florida
- Atlantic High School (Florida), Port Orange, Florida
- Atlantic High School (Iowa), Atlantic, Iowa
