= Michael Peterson =

Mike or Michael Peterson may refer to:

== Sportsmen ==
- Michael Peterson (surfer) (1952–2012), Australian 1970s champion
- Michael Peterson (rower) (born 1967), American Olympian
- Mike Peterson (born 1976), American football linebacker for Atlanta Falcons
- Michael Peterson (American football) (born 1982), tight end for Green Bay Packers
- Michael Petersen (baseball) (born 1994), American baseball pitcher

== Others ==
- Michael Peterson (politician) (1941–2014), American Democratic member of Kansas House of Representatives
- Michael Peterson (author and convicted criminal) (born 1943), American novelist who submitted an Alford plea for manslaughter of his second wife, Kathleen Peterson
- Michael Gordon Peterson (born 1952), English criminal called "most violent prisoner in Britain" a/k/a Charles Bronson / Charles Salvador
- Michael Peterson (singer) (born 1959), American country music singer-songwriter
  - Michael Peterson (album) in 1997

== Characters ==
- Mike Peterson (Marvel Cinematic Universe), cyborg Deathlok from 2013 American TV series Agents of S.H.I.E.L.D.

== See also ==
- Michael Pedersen (disambiguation)
- Mike Petersen (disambiguation)
