= Wead =

Wead is an American surname. It may refer to:

- Ethel T. Wead Mick (1881–1957), American founder of Job's Daughters International
- Frank Wead (1895–1947), American aviator and screenwriter
- Doug Wead (1946–2021), American historian and philanthropist
- Mike Wead or Mikael Wikström (born 1967), Swedish guitarist
