= Charles F. and Ruth Chase House =

Historic house in Iowa, United States

- U.S. National Register of Historic Places
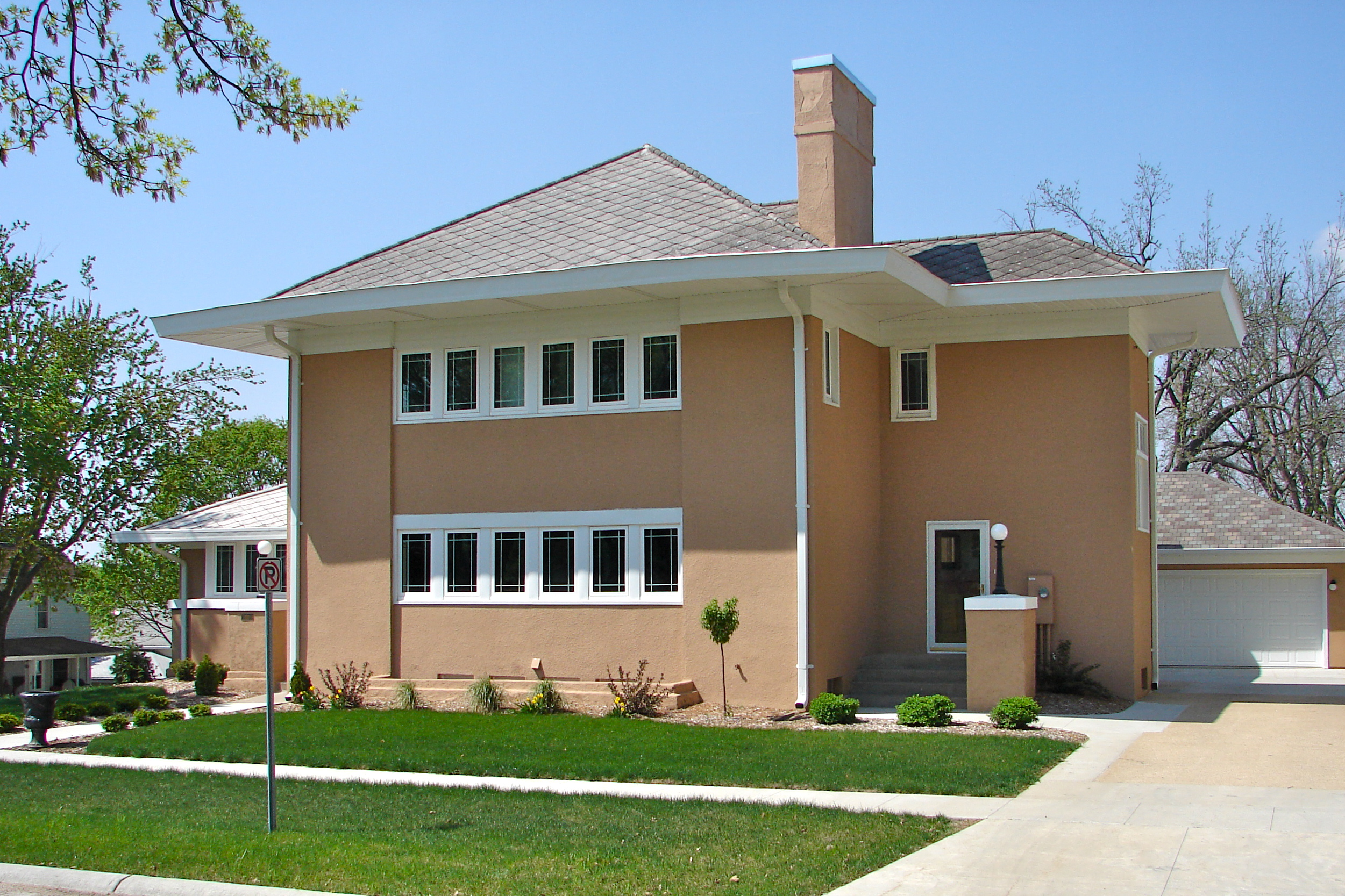

- Location within Iowa Location within the United States
- Location: 110 W. 9th St. Atlantic, Iowa
- Coordinates: 41°24′07″N 95°0′56″W
- Area: less than one acre
- Built: 1915
- Architect: Clarence Yule
- Architectural style: Prairie School
- NRHP reference No.: 99000451
- Added to NRHP: April 15, 1999

The Charles F. and Ruth Chase House, also known as the Judge Whitmore House, is a historic residence located in Atlantic, Iowa, United States. Charles and Ruth Chase established a local newspaper, the Atlantic News-Telegraph. Their son, Edwin Percy Chase, joined his father in the business and won the Pulitzer Prize for the best editorial of 1933. Ruth Chase bought the property the house was built on in 1914 from Dr. F. W. Porterfield for $2,500. The Porterfield house was torn down and this home was completed the following year. It was designed by Creston, Iowa architect Clarence Yule, and is based upon the architectural style made famous by the architect Frank Lloyd Wright. The two-story, stucco-on-frame, Prairie School dwelling features a hipped roof, enclosed front porch, wide overhanging eaves, ribbons of casement windows on both floors of the front and back elevations, and a full basement. It was listed on the National Register of Historic Places in 1999.
