= Hotel Whitney =

- U.S. National Register of Historic Places
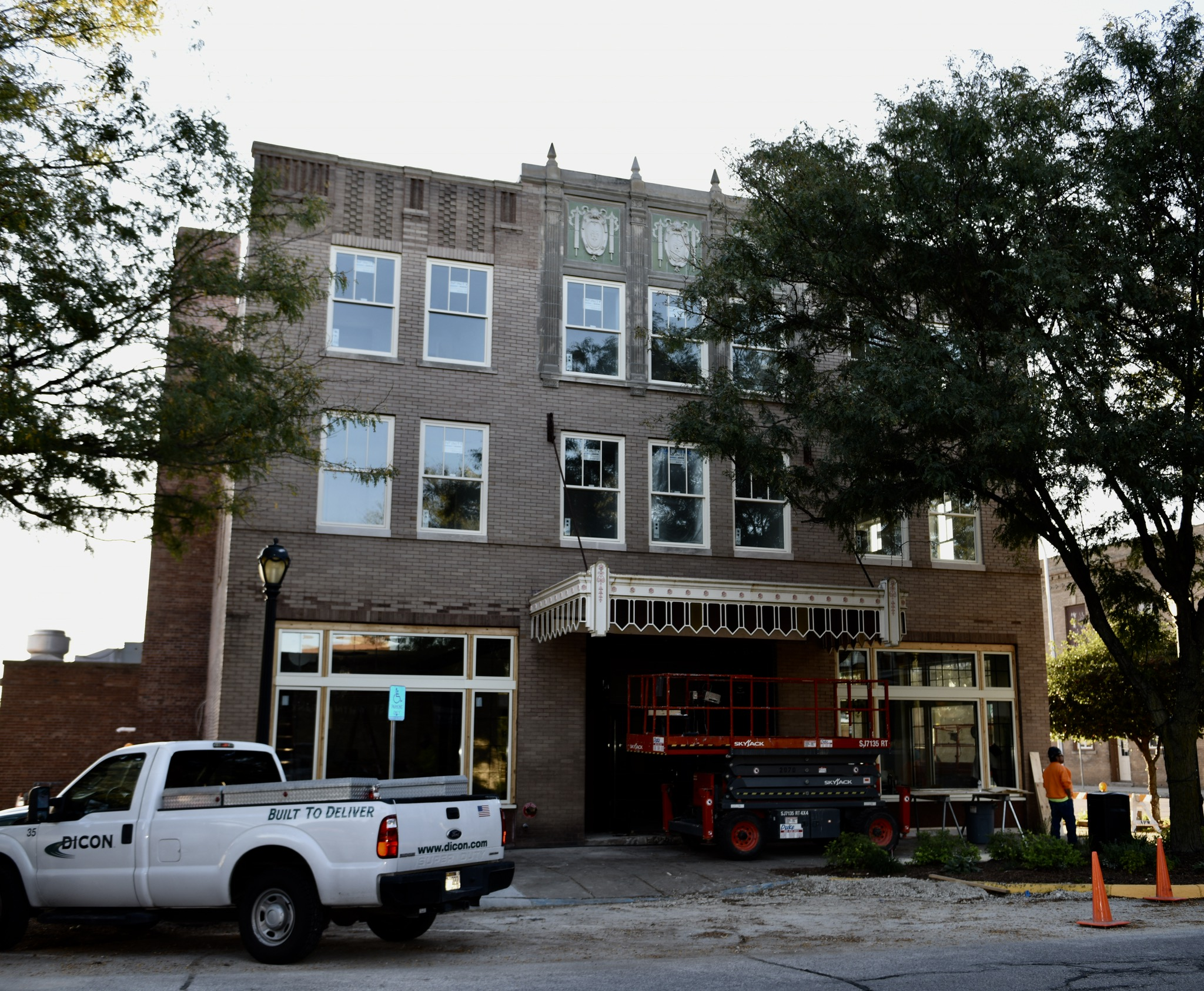

- Location within Iowa Location within the United States
- Location: 222 Chestnut St. Atlantic, Iowa
- Coordinates: 41°24′29.4″N 95°0′45.5″W
- Area: less than one acre
- Built: 1890
- NRHP reference No.: 16000640
- Added to NRHP: September 19, 2016

The Hotel Whitney is a historic building located in Atlantic, Iowa, United States. The three-story Art Deco brick building was completed in 1931. The structure was built so that it could rise to as many as 10-stories. It was also a designated bomb shelter in southwest Iowa. It features a raised parapet in the middle of the main facade. Renovations on the building began in 2016. When completed, the building housed 16 apartments on the top two floors, commercial office space, and a restaurant. The building was listed on the National Register of Historic Places in 2016.
