= Michael Pedersen =

Mikael or Michael Pedersen may refer to:

- Mikael Pedersen (1855–1929), Danish inventor of Pedersen bicycle
- Michael Pedersen (footballer) (born 1963), Danish footballer and manager
- Michael Pedersen (politician) (born 1954), American state representative from New Hampshire
- Michael Pedersen (cricketer) (born 1986), Danish left-handed batsman
- Michael Pedersen (writer) (born 1984), Scottish poet and author

== See also ==
- Michael Pedersen Friis (1857–1944), Danish prime minister in 1920
- Michael Peterson (disambiguation)
- Mike Petersen (disambiguation)
