= Atlantic News-Telegraph =

- Type: Daily newspaper
- Format: Broadsheet
- Owner: Community Media Group
- Publisher: Jeff Lundquist
- Editor: Jeff Lundquist
- Founded: February 16, 1871
- Headquarters: 410 Walnut St., Atlantic, Iowa 50022
- Circulation: 1,590
- Website: swiowanewssource.com/atlantic

The Atlantic News-Telegraph is an online newspaper and is published in Atlantic, Iowa, and covers Cass County, Iowa, and the surrounding area. The newspaper is owned by Community Media Group and publishes five days a week, Tuesdays through Saturdays.

The News-Telegraph received the 1934 Pulitzer Prize for Editorial Writing for "Where Is Our Money?"
