= KJAN =

- Atlantic, Iowa; United States
- Frequency: 1220 kHz
- Branding: KJAN 1220 AM 101.1 FM

Programming
- Format: Adult contemporary

Ownership
- Owner: Wireless Communications Corp.

History
- First air date: 1950

Technical information
- Licensing authority: FCC
- Facility ID: 73031
- Class: D
- Power: 178 watts day 62 watts night
- Transmitter coordinates: 41°25′02″N 95°00′16″W
- Translator: 101.1 K266AN (Atlantic)

Links
- Public license information: Public file; LMS
- Webcast: Listen live
- Website: kjan.com

KJAN (1220 AM) is a commercial radio station serving the Atlantic, Iowa area. The station broadcasts at 178 watts. The station was first licensed October 3, 1950. The station primarily broadcasts an adult contemporary format. KJAN is licensed to Wireless Communications Corp.

Former logo until 2012 and when broadcasting in C-QUAM AM stereo
