= Mike Petersen =

Michael or Mike Petersen may refer to:

- Michael Petersén (game designer), Swedish writer since 1981
- Mike Petersen (Kansas politician) (born 1960), American state senator
- Mike Petersen (soccer) (born 1965), Australian midfielder
- Mike Petersen (Utah politician), American state representative since 2021
- Mike Petersen (basketball), basketball coach
- Michael Petersen (baseball), baseball player

== See also ==
- Michael Peterson (disambiguation)
- Michael Pedersen (disambiguation)
