= Job A. and Rebecca E. McWaid House =

Historic house in Iowa, United States

- U.S. National Register of Historic Places
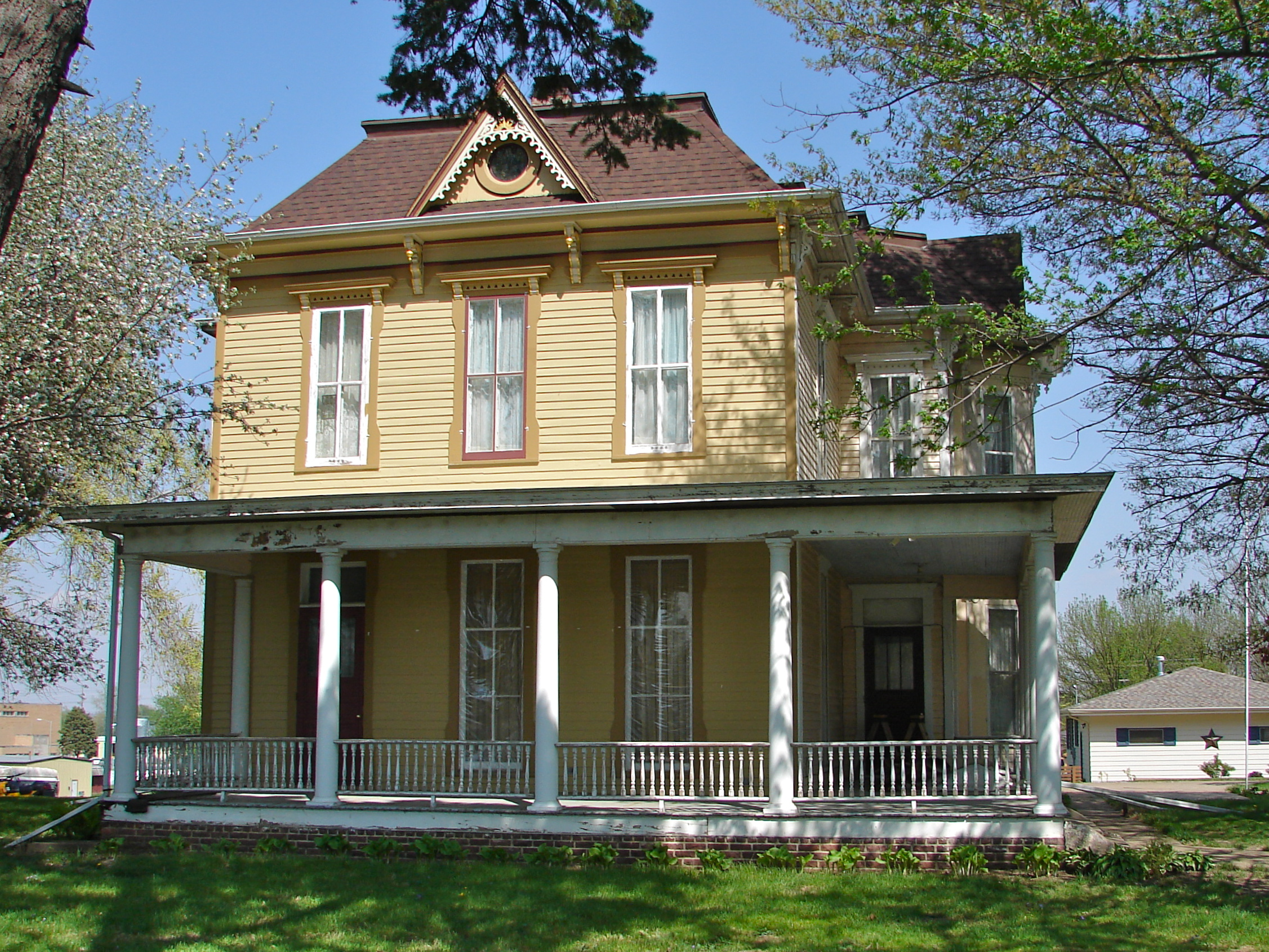

- Location within Iowa Location within the United States
- Location: 702 E. 4th St. Atlantic, Iowa
- Coordinates: 41°24′26″N 95°0′10″W
- Area: less than one acre
- Built: c. 1875
- Architectural style: Queen Anne
- NRHP reference No.: 94001030
- Added to NRHP: September 9, 1994

The Job A. and Rebecca E. McWaid House is a historic residence located in Atlantic, Iowa, United States. Ohio native Job McWaid settled in Atlantic in 1869. He was involved in the industrial, commercial and political development of the town. He entered a partnership in a blacksmith and wagon shop, before he expanded into an agricultural implements, grain and coal. He then established Atlantic Packing House and the Atlantic Canning Factory with another investor, before buying him out. The American Civil War caused him to change his political affiliation to the Republican Party. McWaid served three terms on the Atlantic City Council before serving two terms as mayor. The city's sewage system, the Carnegie library, and other municipal improvements were initiated during his public service. This two-story, frame, Queen Anne house was built around 1875, and McWaid moved here in 1883. It was listed on the National Register of Historic Places in 1984.
