= Job's Daughters International =

Masonic-affiliated youth organisation for girls and young women

Job's Daughters International is a Masonic affiliated youth organization for girls and young women between the ages of 10 and 20. The organization is commonly referred to as simply Job's Daughters, and sometimes abbreviated as JDI (or IOJD, referring to its longtime former name, International Order of Job's Daughters). Job's Daughters welcomes many religions and cultures.

JDI promotes itself as an organization "where girls rule," but there is much adult guidance and assistance.

== Membership ==
In order to apply for membership in Job's Daughters, one must be a girl between the ages of 10 and 20. To join this organization, an applicant may be either related to a Master Mason or be sponsored by a Majority Member of Job's Daughters and a Master Mason.

Members are not required to practice any particular religion, but they must believe in a Supreme Being.

Members of Job's Daughters are also not restricted to join or be leaders in other Masonic youth bodies, such as Rainbow for Girls and can serve as any of the female youth leaders in DeMolay being able to serve as a Sweetheart, Princess, Duchess, and Chapter Little Sis. At age 18, they also are eligible to join the Order of Eastern Star, The Daughters of the Nile, the Order of the White Shrine of Jerusalem, and other appendant bodies.

When a daughter reaches the age of 20 or marries, if she is in good standing, she can become a majority member. Majority members are encouraged to remain active in the order as adult leaders otherwise known as Certified Adult Volunteers, who have to go through a training session to be able to supervise members other than their own family.

== History ==
The organization was founded as The Order of Job's Daughters by Ethel T. Wead Mick in Omaha, Nebraska, on October 20, 1920. The purpose of the organization is to band together young women and strives to build character through moral and spiritual development. Goals include a greater reverence for God and the Holy Scriptures, as stated in the Job's Daughters Constitution, loyalty to one's country and that country's flag; and respect for parents, guardians, and elderly as well as each other.

Ethel T. Wead Mick, called "Mother Mick" was fond of the Book of Job, and took the name of the organization as a reference to the three daughters of Job. Which was often read to her as a child by her mother. The Book of Job, 42nd chapter, 15th verse says, "In all the land were no women found so fair as the Daughters of Job, and their father gave them inheritance among their brethren". The first part representing the members of the order, and the second part, "and their father gave them inheritance among their brethren," standing for the masonic heritage that members have, which was originally a requirement for membership in Job's Daughters. Ethel founded the Order with the assistance of her husband, Dr. William H. Mick, and several Freemasons and members of Eastern Star of Nebraska. She dedicated the organization to the memory of her mother, Elizabeth D. Wead.

By June 1923 the Job's Daughters had been endorsed by the Grand Chapters of the Order of the Eastern Star in Indiana, Maryland, Minnesota and Washington, DC. The order spread rapidly in the early 1920s. At the third annual meeting of the "Supreme Guardian Council" in Chicago on Oct. 12, 1923, delegates were present from twenty-three states, the Territory of Alaska and Manitoba.

In 1931 the name was changed to the International Order of Job's Daughters after a Bethel was instituted in Vancouver, British Columbia.

Later, the name was changed from the International Order of Job's Daughters to Job's Daughters International.

The ritual of the Order was drawn up by Le Roy T. Wilcox, a scholar of Masonic law, and the group came "under the general management of the Masonic order". It was originally adopted in 1921. The ritual has been revised a total number of 8 times, in 1934, 1944, 1954, 1964, 1974, 1989,2011 and most recently in 2025. The ritual is set to be revised further in July 2026.

== Levels of Jurisdiction ==
- The individual chapter is called a Bethel, and each is numbered sequentially according to when they were instituted in their jurisdiction. They commonly meet at a Masonic Lodge building, but may meet at a church hall, or other fraternal hall.
- The next level is the Grand level. This comprises all the Bethels in their respective state, or country in the case of the Philippines. This level has an annual convention located somewhere in that jurisdiction and can last a few days each time. These conventions usually encompass the Grand Bethel Meetings and/or Installation, and the Installation of the Grand Guardian Council. Jurisdictions that do not have a Grand level and are directly under Supreme law often host similar events as substitutions.
- The highest level in the Order is the Supreme level. This is similar to the Grand level, except on an international scale. It encompasses all jurisdictions in Job's Daughters, the Supreme Guardian Council, the Supreme Bethel, Supreme Bethel Honored Queen and the Miss International Job's Daughter.

Each level above the local Bethel has a different philanthropic project. The Supreme project is the H.I.K.E Fund, or Hearing Improvement Kids Endowment Foundation. The Grand jurisdiction varies by area, and typically changes every year.

Today, Bethels and Grand Bethels are active in Australia, Brazil, Canada, the Philippines and the United States. Within the United States, there are currently Bethels in 28 states. Most states and provinces have a Grand Guardian Council but some are under the direct supervision of the Supreme Guardian Council.

== Official Regalia ==
Members of JDI are recognizable by their dress, which is white Grecian robes which would have been worn during the time of Job, purposed to stress the ideals of equality; symbolic of equal importance in life. Creating a space for everyone, regardless of background, family or identity outside of the bethel. The color white represents purity and joy.

The Three Principal officers of the bethel, the Honored Queen, Senior Princess and Junior Princess, wear capes and crowns. The cape for the Honored Queen is the longest, being floor length, while the other two are shorter, landing about the hips. Capes are purple, to represent royalty, both in blood and in character. They often have a white Grecian grid-lock pattern along the trim, and are secured the same way standard robes are. The crowns have minor differences between them for each of the offices.

The Junior Princess' Crown has a white jewel in the center to represent hope, purity, and truth. In modern versions of the crown, there are doves on it to represent the first epoch of initiation. It mirrors the name of the first daughter of Job, Jemima, meaning "Dove."

The Senior Princess' Crown has a purple jewel in the center to represent royalty. In the modern versions of the crown there are Urns of Incense, to represent prayer. It mirrors the name of Job's second daughter, Keziah, meaning "used in incense," or "prayer."

The Honored Queen's Crown is similar to the Senior Princess' with its center purple jewel. The notable difference is the modern version, where the crown has two Cornucopia, or Horns of Plenty, on the crown in the same placement as the urn or dove for the princesses. It has the same connection to the daughters of Job as the others, representing Keren Happuch, the third daughter of Job, whose name means "plenty," or "abundance."

== Famous Job's Daughters ==
Notable former Job's Daughters include Kim Cattrall, Jacquelynne Fontaine, Nancy Fleming, Jenilee Harrison, Nannette Hegerty, Vicki Lawrence, Heather Moore, Nancy Ling Perry, Jean Rabe, Debbie Reynolds, and Aimee Teegarden.

== H.I.K.E. ==
Members of Job's Daughters participate in raising funds for the philanthropic project of the Order, the Hearing Improved Kids Endowment Fund, or H.I.K.E. It was founded by Emma Tedrick and Charles Terrel to help children be able to access hearing devices. It is staffed by unpaid volunteers in the US and Canada. The organization estimates around 100 children are provided with hearing devices each year with H.I.K.E.

Jobs Daughters often honor this organization by using sign language in their ceremonies, songs and closing formations at the close of meetings. Most notably signing and singing the first and fifth lyric of "Nearer, My God to Thee," in the Christian Cross formation. The Honored Queen, Senior Princess and Junior Princess sign the words in most cases. Other songs have been adapted into sign, but it varies for each state and jurisdiction.
