= Ethel T. Wead Mick =

American Masonic organization founder

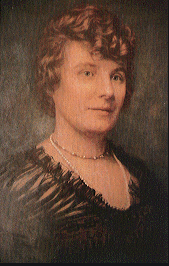

Ethel Theresa Wead Mick (March 9, 1881 – February 21, 1957) was the founder of the Masonic girls' organization The International Order of Job's Daughters (now known as Job's Daughters International) and served as its first Supreme Guardian.

== History ==
She was born on March 9, 1881, in Atlantic, Iowa to William Henry Wead and Elizabeth Delight Hutchinson Wead, the youngest of four siblings. She was brought up in a close-knit, very religious family. Her mother read stories from the Bible every evening and often made reference to the Book of Job, hoping that her daughters would become "as fair as the daughters of Job." This influence eventually resulted in the founding of the Order of Job's Daughters in 1920, so named in honor of her mother. The group became International in 1931 when a bethel opened in British Columbia, Canada. Job's Daughters International now exists in the US, Canada, Brazil, Australia and the Philippines.

Wead met William Mick while attending Creighton Medical College in Omaha, Nebraska. They were married in May 1904 and had two daughters, Ethel and Ruth. She enjoyed a variety of hobbies including oil painting, singing, reading, traveling and participating in several different fraternal organizations and civic clubs including the Nebraska Mayflower Society, Nu Sigma Phi (a medical sorority), the National Society of United States Daughters of 1812, Daughters of the American Revolution, White Shrine of Jerusalem, Order of the Eastern Star, and Ladies Auxiliary of the Veterans of Foreign Wars. She died in Cleveland, Ohio, and is buried in Omaha.
