= Atlantic station (Chicago, Rock Island & Pacific Railroad) =

Former train station in Atlantic, Iowa

Atlantic
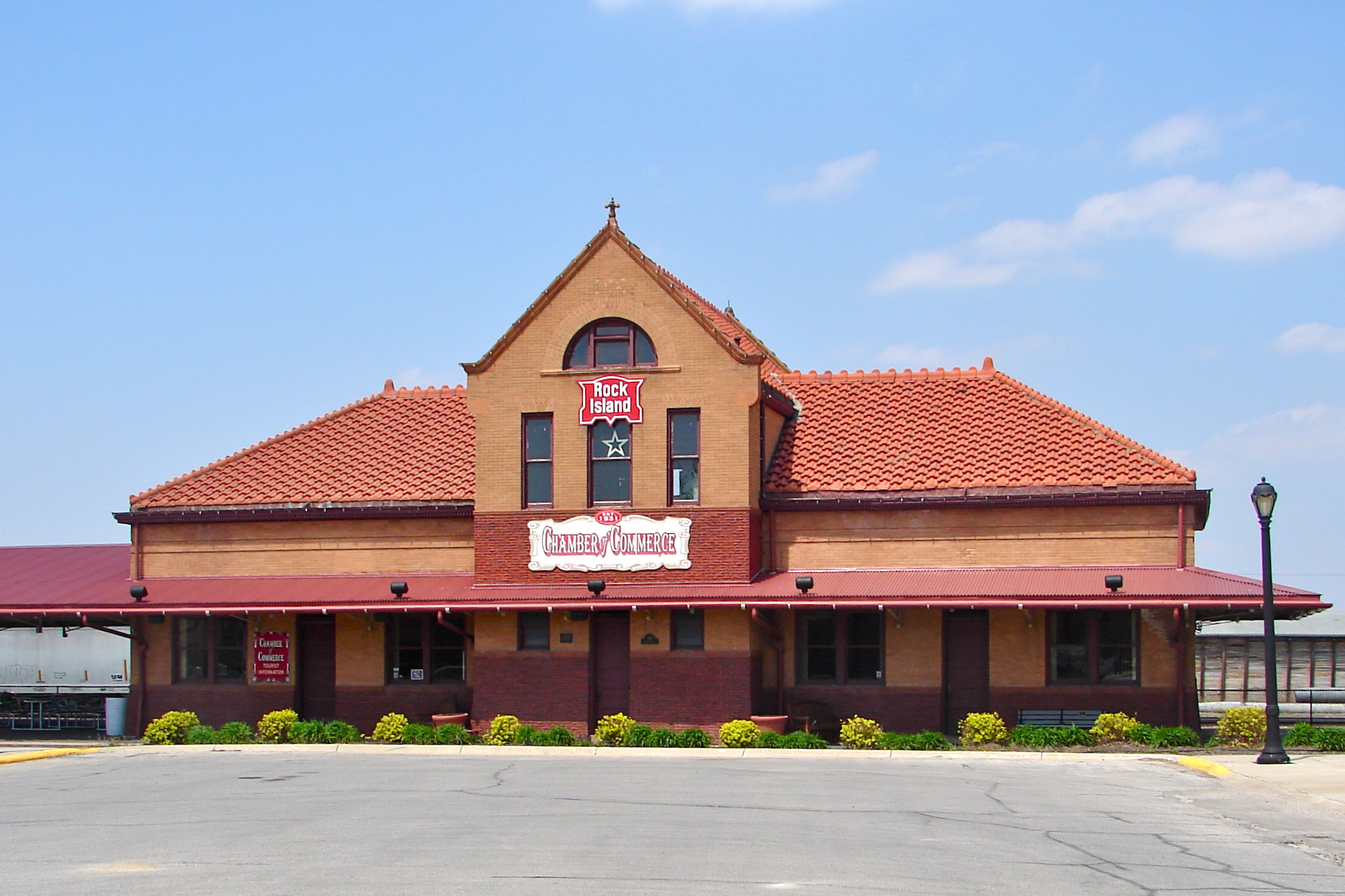

General information
- Location: 102 North Chestnut Street, Atlantic, Iowa 50022
- System: Former Rock Island Line passenger rail station

History
- Opened: 1868
- Closed: May 31, 1970
- Rebuilt: 1898

Services
Preceding station	Chicago, Rock Island and Pacific Railroad	Following station
Walnut toward Colorado Springs	Main Line	Wiota toward Chicago
- Chicago, Rock Island & Pacific; Railroad Depot
- U.S. National Register of Historic Places
- Location within Iowa Location within the United States
- Location: Junction of 1st and Chesnut Sts., Atlantic, Iowa
- Coordinates: 41°24′36″N 95°0′46″W
- Built: 1898
- Built by: Chicago, Rock Island & Pacific Railroad
- Architectural style: Renaissance Revival
- MPS: Advent & Development of Railroads in Iowa MPS
- NRHP reference No.: 94000087
- Added to NRHP: February 23, 1994
Location

Atlantic station is an historic building located in Atlantic, Iowa, United States. The Chicago, Rock Island & Pacific Railroad built the first tracks through the area in 1868. The city of Atlantic was founded at the time of the railroad construction. It grew to become the largest and the most significant community along the Rock Island lines between Des Moines and Council Bluffs. The present depot dates from 1898, and it is not a standard-plan depot for the railroad. The unusual design suggests it is the work of an architect, possibly from Chicago. It was built during a prosperous period for the railroad when it was able to replace its facilities along its mainline. The express freight and baggage building attached to the depot was built at the same time. The passenger depot replaced a frame combination passenger and freight depot a block away.

Service included the CRI&P's Corn Belt Rocket and Rocky Mountain Rocket passenger lines. In the trains' final year there, the route was shortened to Chicago to Council Bluffs. Service ended on May 31, 1970; with the end of the Council Bluffs train.

After its use as a depot, the building fell into disrepair before it was restored. It now houses the local chamber of commerce. The building was listed on the National Register of Historic Places in 1994.
