= Griswold National Bank =

- U.S. National Register of Historic Places
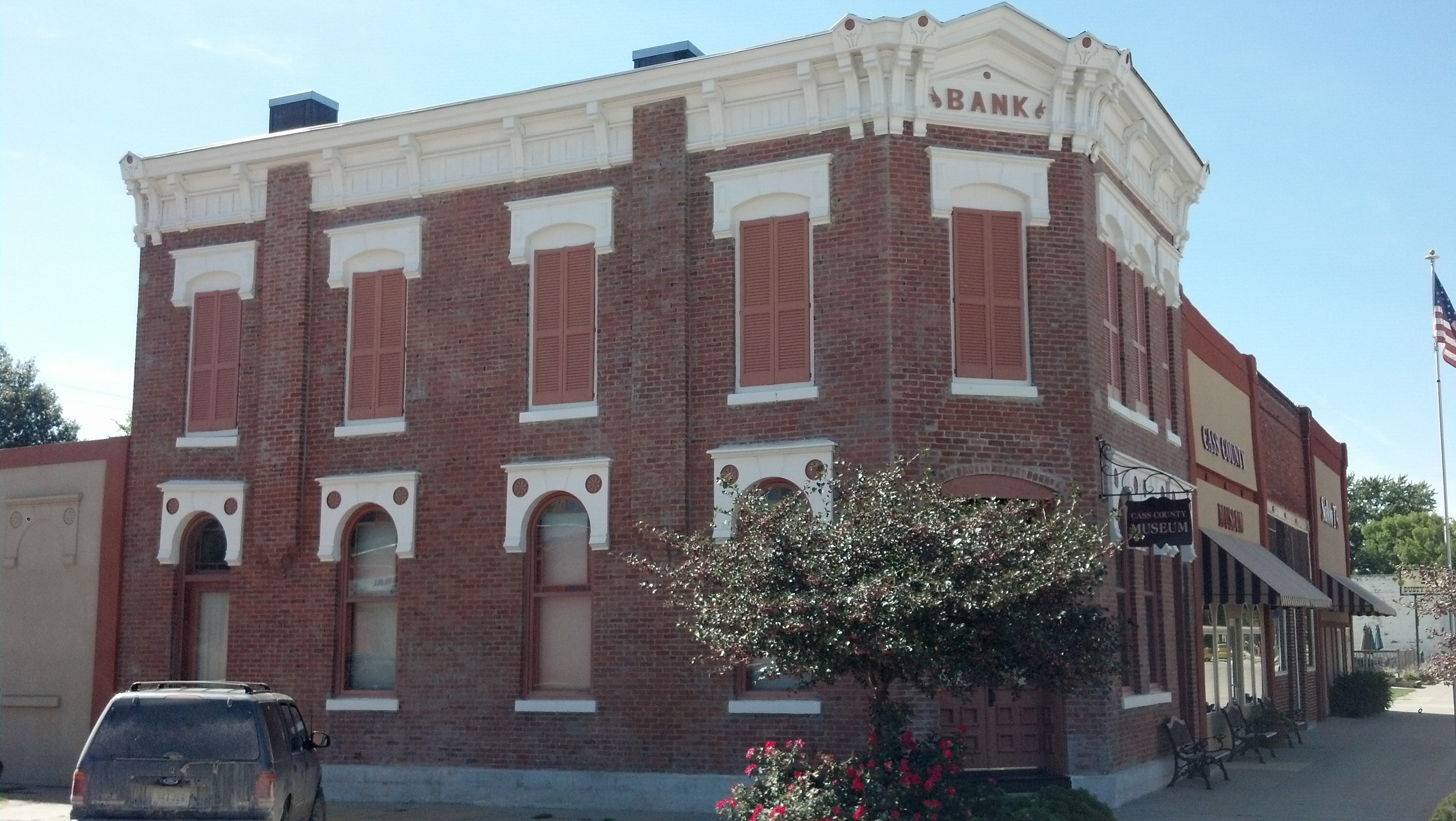

- Location within Iowa Location within the United States
- Location: Main and Cass; Griswold, Iowa
- Coordinates: 41°14′04″N 95°08′34″W
- Built: 1885
- NRHP reference No.: 79003695
- Added to NRHP: February 22, 1979

The Griswold National Bank is an historic building located in Griswold, Iowa, United States.

== History ==
F.H. Whitney established the Bank of Griswold in 1880. Three years later it merged with the recently established First National Bank. The two-story brick building was completed in 1885. The bank operated out of this building until 1930 when it went into receivership.

The building now houses the Cass County Historical Society Museum. It was listed on the National Register of Historic Places in 1979.
