= Association of Christians in Student Development =

The Association for Christians in Student Development (ACSD) is a global organization that "provide[s] opportunities for the integration of Scripture and the Christian faith in the Student Development profession." ACSD's work with Christians at institutions around the world seeks to support and equip student development professionals through networking and professional development. Its primary services include an annual summer conference, two publications, career services, and topic-based collaboratives.

== History ==
In 1980, two student personnel associations, the Association of Christian Deans and Advisors of Men (ACDAM) and the Christian Association of Deans of Women (CADW), decided to merge to provide greater opportunities for collaboration and connection. Since their union, Christian men and women across the country have gathered together annually for professional development and networking opportunities.

== Membership ==
ACSD members include those who identify as Christian and have professional relationship with the field of student development. The association exists to serve all Christians in the field, including those who serve at non-faith-based institutions and faith-based institutions. Annual membership is extremely affordable and runs on the calendar year, January through December.

== Annual conference ==
Each June, a Christian college or university hosts an annual conference at its institution. Conferences typically feature notable scholars or practitioners in the fields of education or ministry. In addition to these keynote sessions, extensive workshop offerings are facilitated by ACSD members on a variety of topics pertaining to the field.

== Publications ==
ACSD oversees two separate publications, Koinonia and Growth. Koinonia is published twice per year, and Growth is published once. Koinonia is not focused on academic research and instead is a magazine which tries to "explore student culture, and share and learn from each other’s experiences, best practices, and stories". GROWTH has a more academic focus, and provides a place for Christian authors to publish academic student development research.
