= Michael Peterson (American football) =

American football player (born 1982)

Profile
- Position: Tight end

Personal information
- Born: November 29, 1982 (age 43); Atlantic, Iowa
- Listed height: 6 ft 2 in (1.88 m)
- Listed weight: 247 lb (112 kg)

Career information
- College: Northwest Missouri State
- NFL draft: 2008: undrafted

Career history
- Green Bay Packers (2008)*; Omaha Nighthawks (2010)
- * Offseason or practice squad member only

Michael Peterson (born November 29, 1982) is an American former football tight end. He was signed by the Green Bay Packers as an undrafted free agent in 2008. He played college football at Northwest Missouri State Bearcats football.

Peterson also played for the Omaha Nighthawks.

== Professional career ==
=== Green Bay Packers ===
Peterson was waived by the Packers on July 26, 2008.

=== Omaha Nighthawks ===
Peterson signed with the Omaha Nighthawks of the United Football League in July 2010. He was released on November 14.
