= Atlantic Community School District =

Public school district in Atlantic, Iowa, United States

Coordinates: 41.399690°N 95.007057°W

Location
- Atlantic, Iowa Cass, Audubon and Pottawattamie counties United States
- Coordinates: 41.399690, -95.007057

District information
- Type: Local school district
- Grades: K–12
- Superintendent: Dr. Beth Johnsen
- Schools: Schuler Elementary, Washington Elementary, Atlantic Middle, Atlantic High School
- Budget: $22,560,000 (2020-21)
- NCES District ID: 1903930

Students and staff
- Students: 1603 (2022-23)
- Teachers: 105.76 FTE
- Staff: 132.71 FTE
- Student–teacher ratio: 15.16
- Athletic conference: Hawkeye 10
- District mascot: Trojans
- Colors: Black and gold

Other information
- Website: www.atlanticiaschools.org

Atlantic Community School District (ACSD) is a public school district headquartered in Atlantic, Iowa. The district is mostly in Cass County and also occupies parts of Audubon and Pottawattamie counties. The district serves Atlantic and Marne.

== History ==
Michael Amstein served as the superintendent from April 2010 until 2016, when he retired. Steve Barber, formerly of the George–Little Rock Community School District, became the new superintendent at that time.

== Schools ==
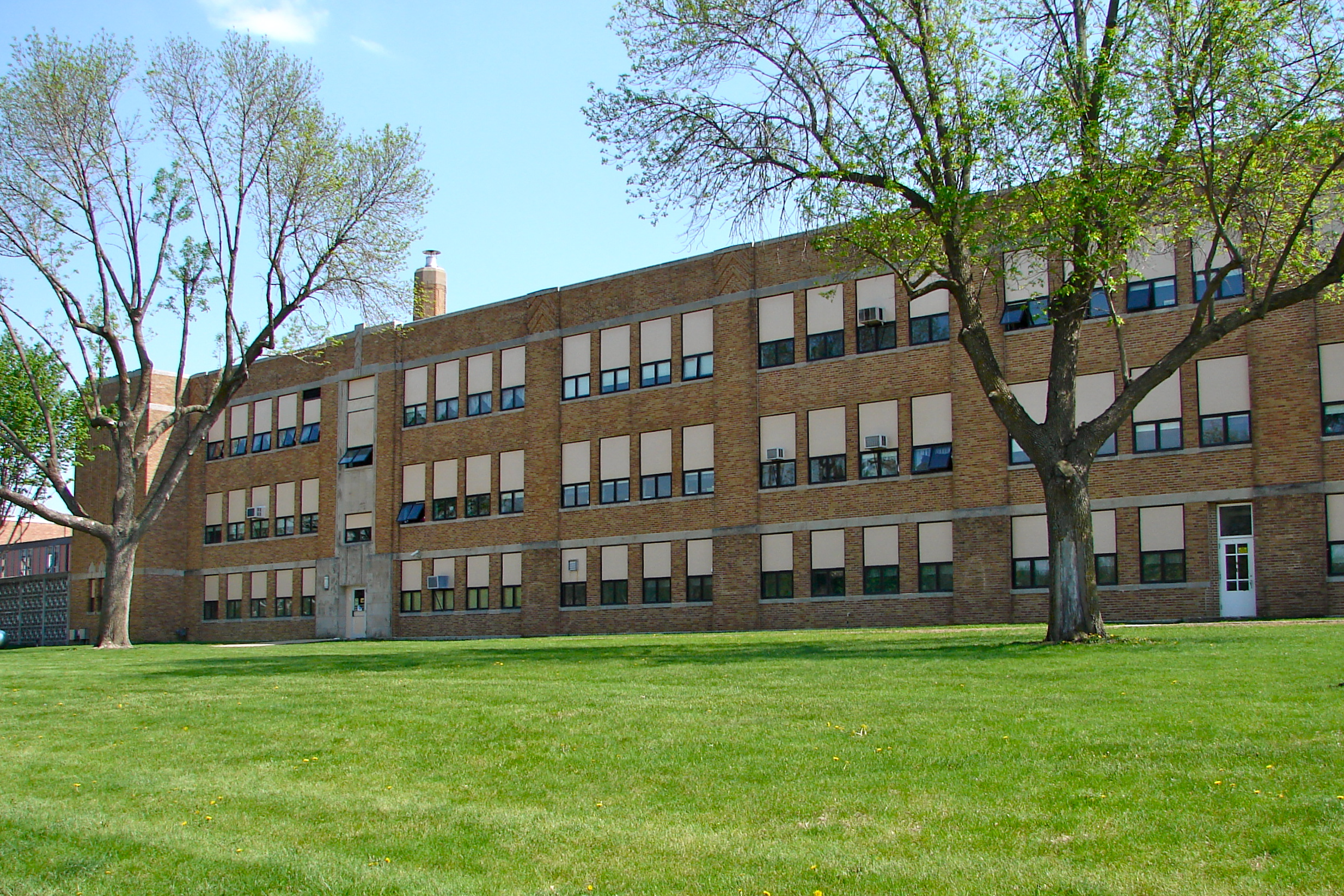
Atlantic Middle School, the former Atlantic High School

All schools are in Atlantic:

- Atlantic High School (9–12)
- Atlantic Middle School (6–8)
- Washington Elementary School (PK–3)
- Schuler Elementary School (4–5)
- Early Learning Center

== See also ==
- List of school districts in Iowa
