= Atlantic High School (Iowa) =

Public secondary school in Atlantic, Iowa, United States

- U.S. National Register of Historic Places
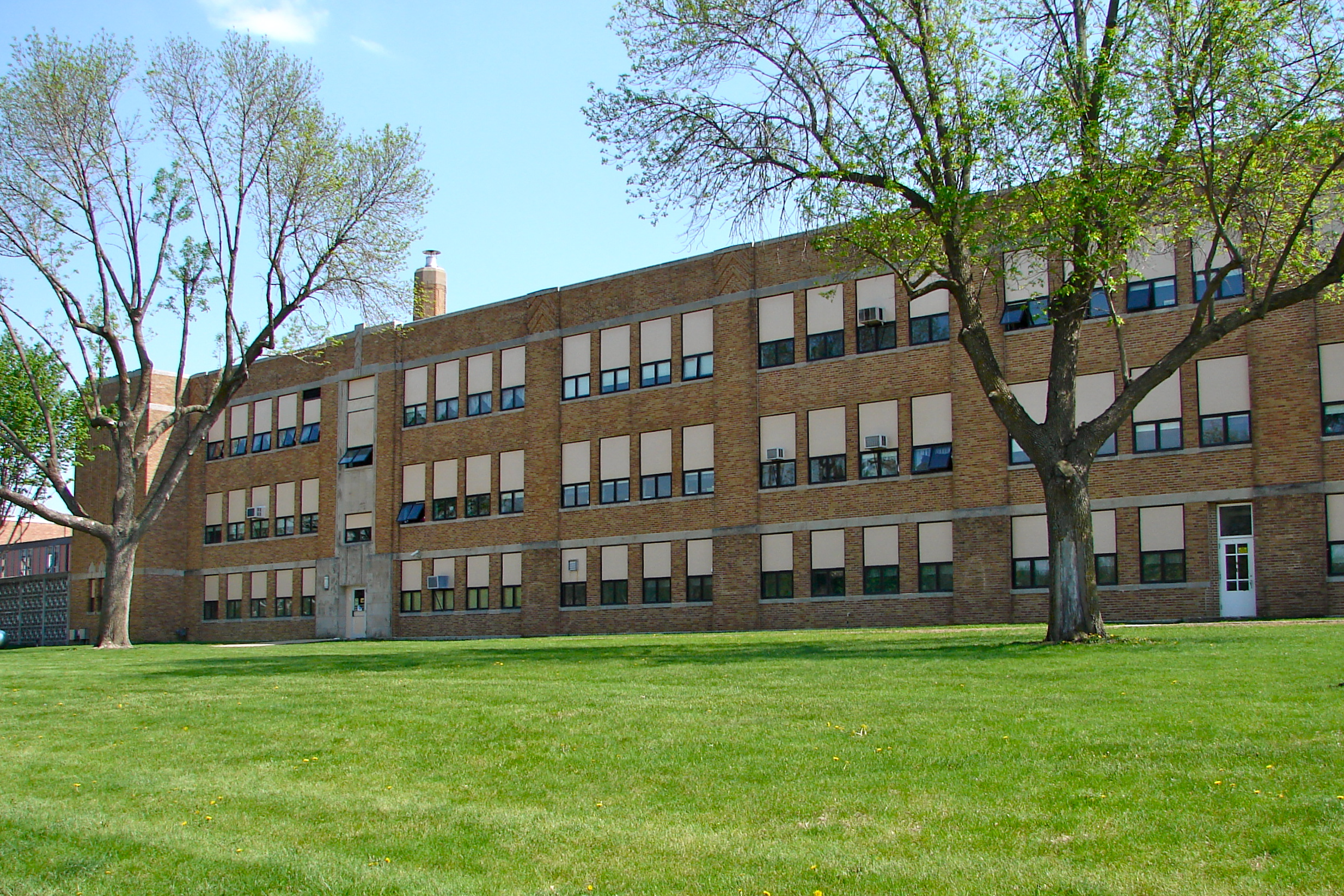
- 1937 high-school building

- Location within Iowa Location within the United States
- Location: 1100 Linn St. Atlantic, Iowa
- Coordinates: 41.3944°N 94.9966°W
- Area: 37.7 acres (15.3 ha)
- Built: 1937
- Architect: Keffer & Jones
- Architectural style: Streamline Moderne
- Website: ahs.atlanticiaschools.org
- MPS: Public Schools for Iowa: Growth and Change MPS
- NRHP reference No.: 02001248
- Added to NRHP: October 24, 2002

Atlantic High School (commonly known as AHS) is a rural public high school in Atlantic, Iowa, United States, and serves students in grades nine through twelve. It is a part of the Atlantic Community School District, which serves Atlantic and Marne. The AHS mascot is the Trojans and their colors are black and gold.

The old high school building, now used as the middle school, was built in 1937 as part of the Public Works Administration during the Great Depression and was listed on the National Register of Historic Places in 2002.

One notable alum is Todd A. Hensley, a district associate judge for Iowa's Third Judicial District.

== Athletics ==
The Trojans compete in the Hawkeye 10 Conference in the following sports:

=== Fall Sports ===
- Cross Country (boys and girls)
- Football
- Volleyball
- Swimming (girls)

=== Winter Sports ===
- Basketball (boys and girls)
- Bowling
- Wrestling (boys and girls)
- Swimming (boys)

=== Spring Sports ===
- Golf (boys and girls)
- Soccer (boys and girls)
- Tennis (boys and girls)
- Track and Field (boys and girls)

=== Summer Sports ===
- Baseball
- Softball

== Notable alumni ==
- Ed Podolak (1965), NFL running back
- Dave Becker (1975), NFL defensive back
- Ryan Hawkins (2016), basketball player who plays in France

== See also ==
- List of high schools in Iowa
