= Atlantic, Iowa =

- City
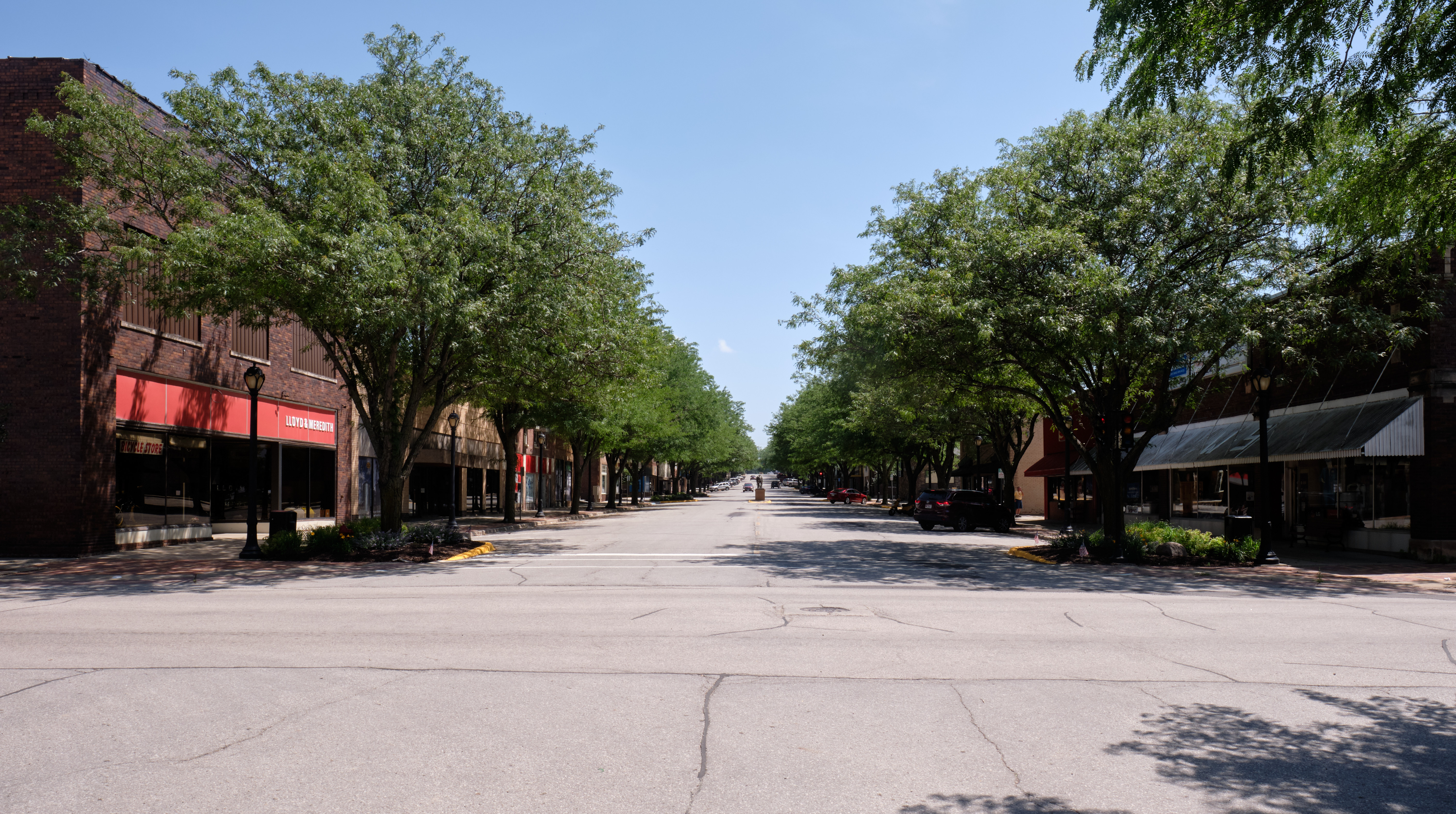
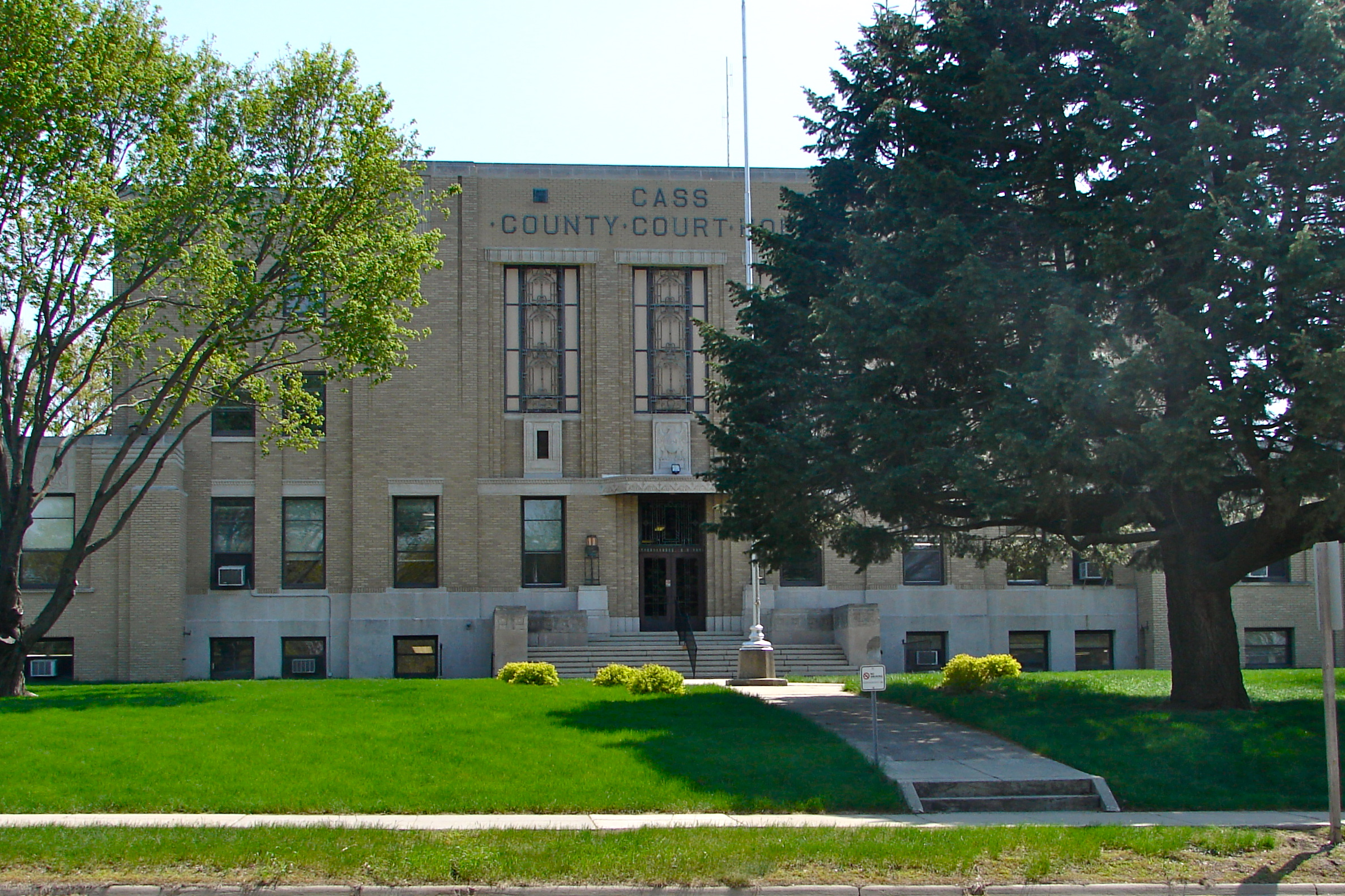
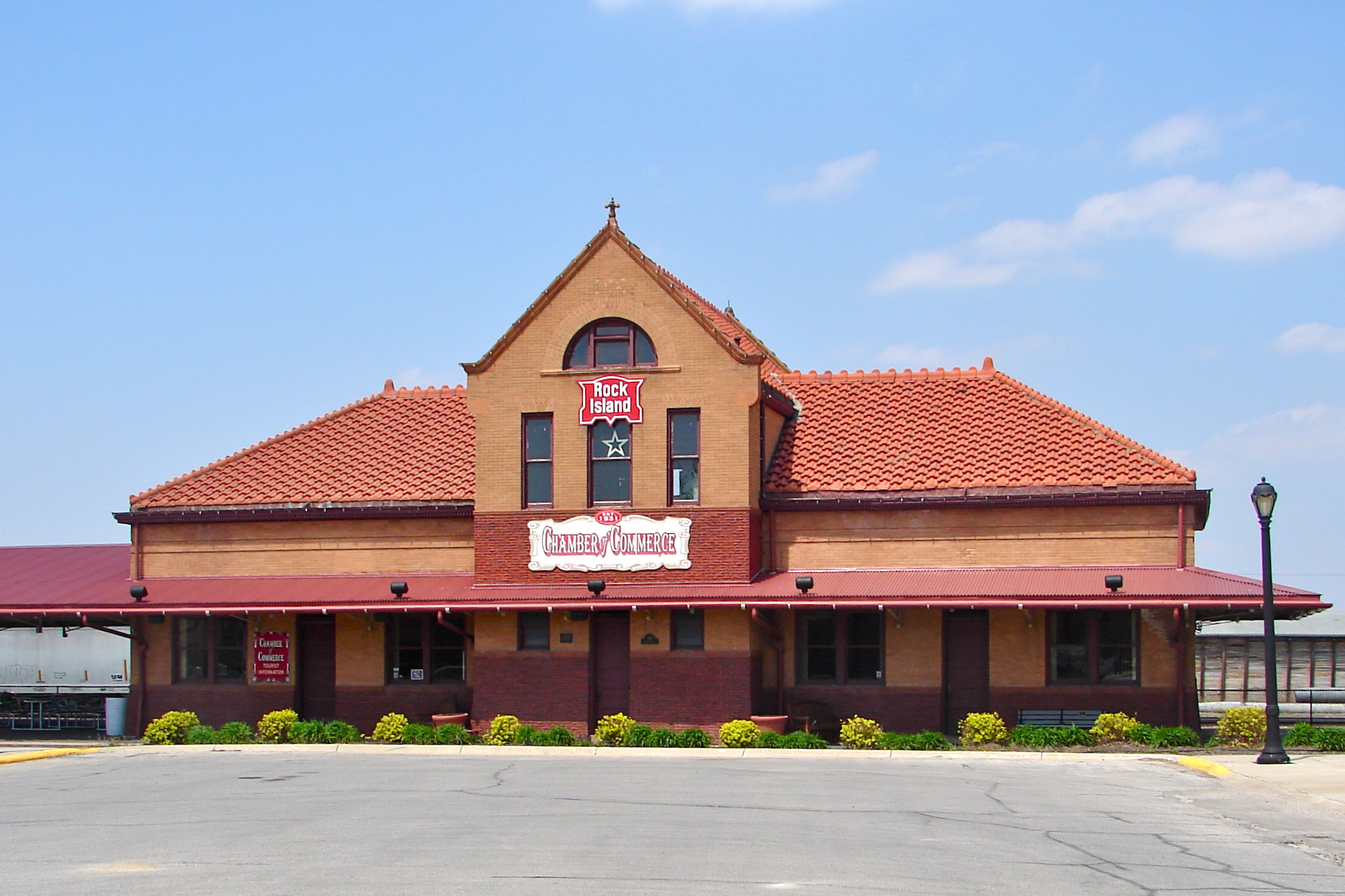
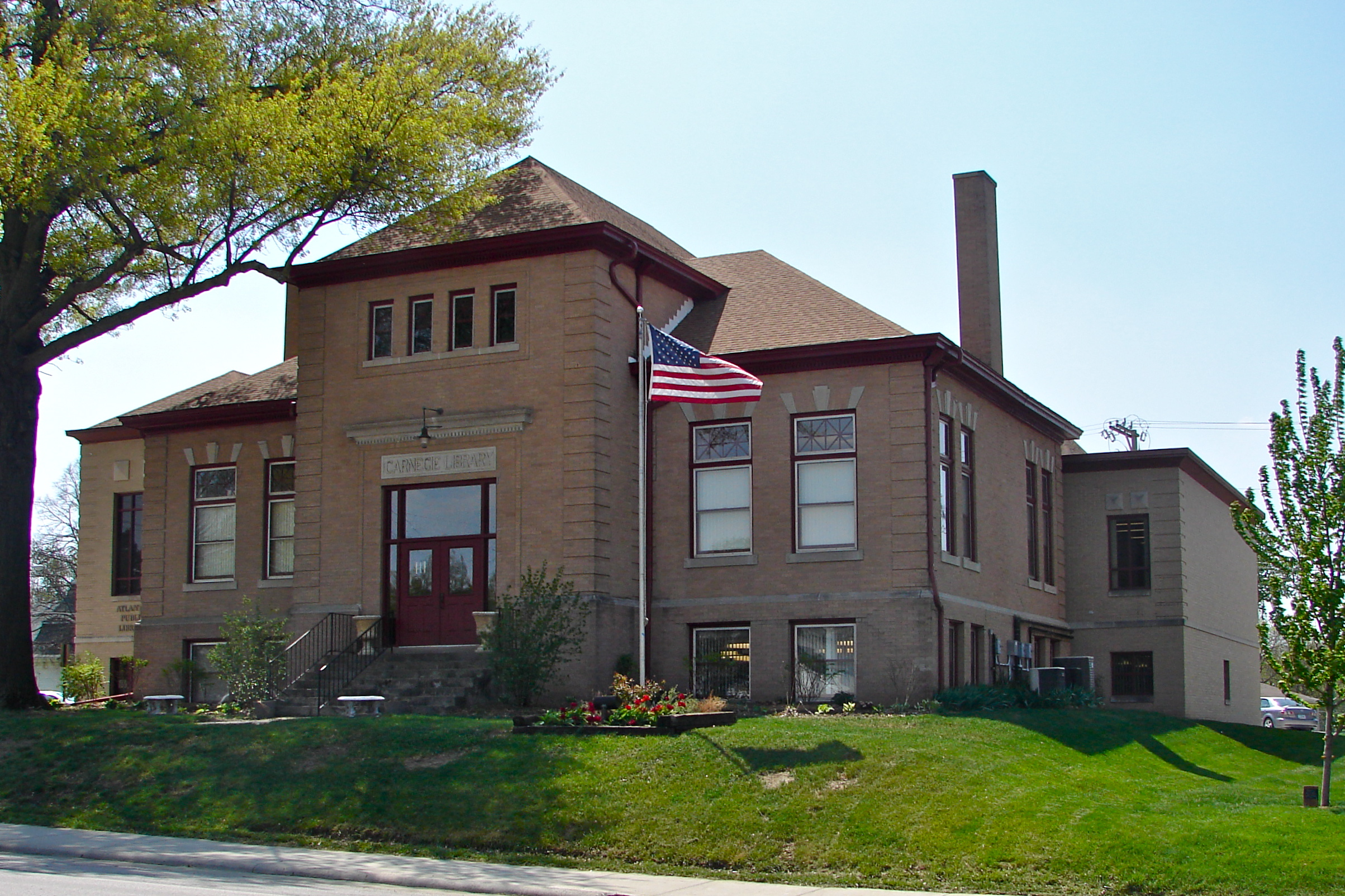
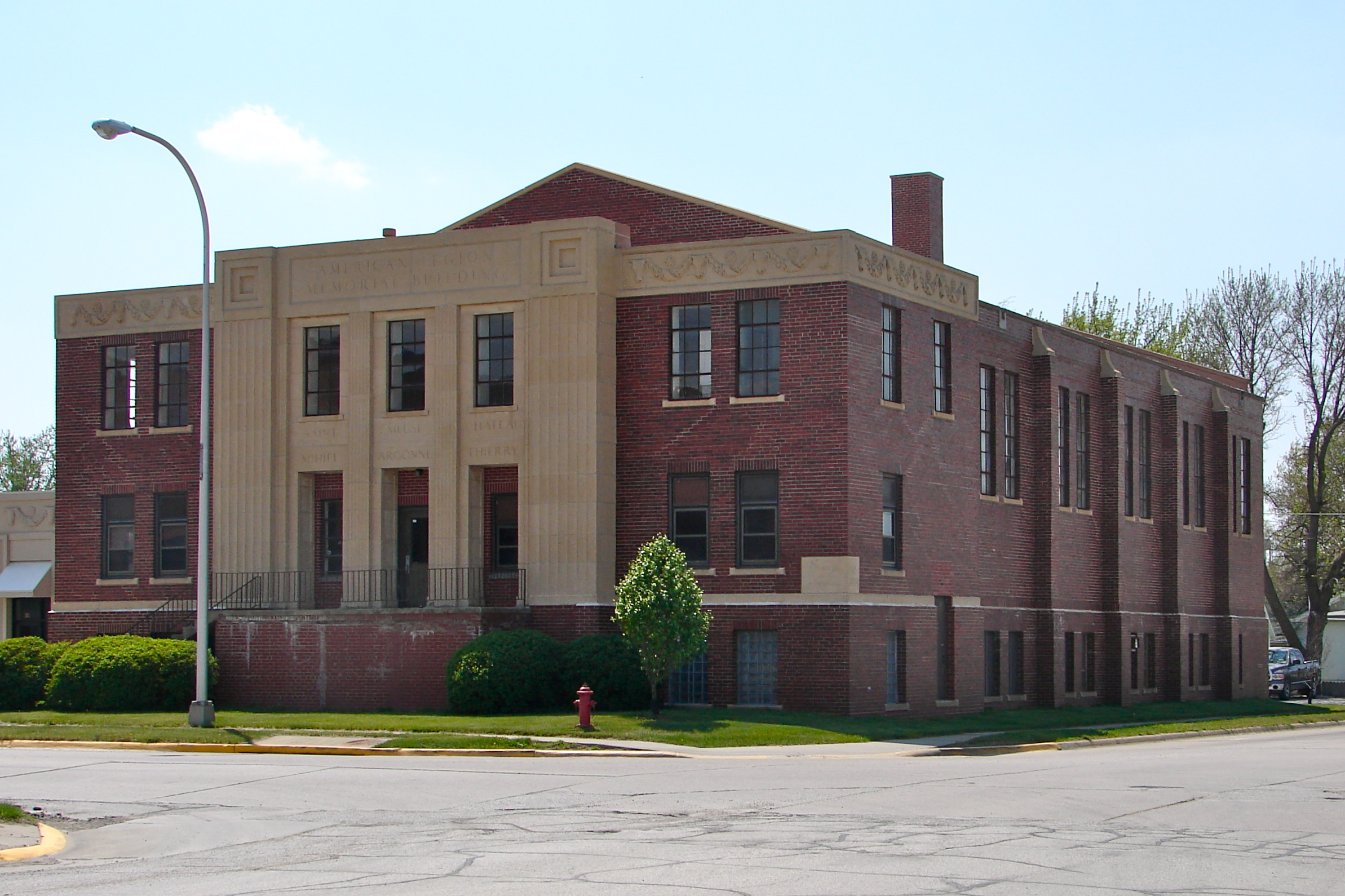
- Looking south down Chestnut Street Cass County Courthouse Atlantic station Carnegie Library American Legion Memorial Building
- Mottoes: Coca-Cola Capital of Iowa, Christmas Capital of Iowa (2019)
- Location of Atlantic, Iowa
- Coordinates: 41°23′49″N 95°00′12″W
- Country: United States
- State: Iowa
- County: Cass

Area
  - Total: 8.34 sq mi (21.60 km^{2})
  - Land: 8.29 sq mi (21.48 km^{2})
  - Water: 0.042 sq mi (0.11 km^{2})
- Elevation: 1,299 ft (396 m)

Population (2020)
  - Total: 6,792
  - Density: 818.8/sq mi (316.15/km^{2})
- Time zone: UTC-6 (Central (CST))
  - Summer (DST): UTC-5 (CDT)
- ZIP code: 50022
- Area code: 712
- FIPS code: 19-03520
- GNIS feature ID: 2394017
- Website: atlanticiowa.com

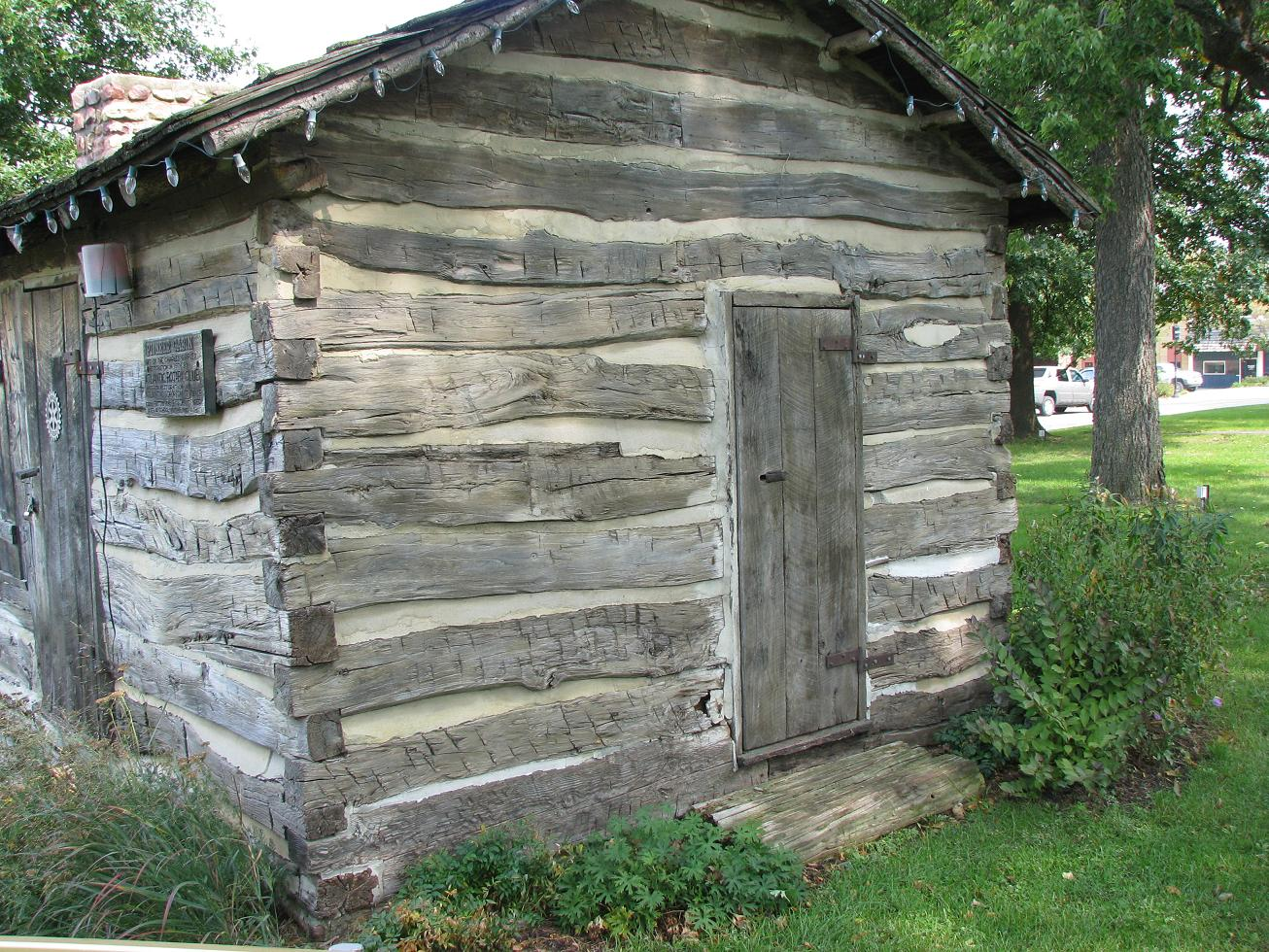
Gingery Log cabin, Atlantic, Iowa

Atlantic is a city in and the county seat of Cass County, Iowa, United States, located along the East Nishnabotna River. The population was 6,792 in the 2020 census, a decline from the 7,257 population in 2000.

== History ==
Atlantic was founded in October 1868 by Franklin H. Whitney, B.F. Allen, John P. Cook, and others. While historians cannot agree on how Atlantic got its name, local legend tells that the founding fathers estimated that the town was about halfway between the Pacific Ocean and the Atlantic Ocean, so it led them to flip a coin and, clearly, Atlantic won. The nearby Rock Island Railroad was important in deciding the actual location of the town, and to this day, the old depot, built in 1898, sits at the north end of Chestnut Street. Today, the depot serves as the offices of the Chamber of Commerce.

A log cabin stands in Atlantic City Park with a historical plaque bearing the following inscription:

A Link With the Past

This 14 by 18 foot log cabin was built by John Gingery in 1863 in what was called Five Mile Grove located two miles northeast of Atlantic. John left Stark County where he had been raised and has become a school teacher. He was twenty-six years old and arrived just as Cass County was being organized. He was hired by Cass County to do their clerical work in organizing the county.

John Gingery married Mary Hyatt of Audubon County, Iowa on April 28, 1866. Ten children were born to them and all were born in this log house except the tenth and youngest child. This cabin may also have been used as the first school house in Pymosa Township until 1868 when a separate school building was erected.

The cabin was on the Gipple farm northeast of Atlantic when the Atlantic Rotary Club became interested in preserving and restoring it as the club's Bi-Centennial project in 1976. The Rotarians and Boy Scout troop 60 dismantled the cabin and numbered each log for rebuilding purposes. The Atlantic Soroptomists furnished the cabin much as it was originally furnished. It was the hope of the Atlantic Rotary Club that this cabin would typify the early history in Cass County and in the State of Iowa.

Another story told about Atlantic is the way the main street was located. Someone asked Whitney where it should be placed. He marked the center at current day 6th and Chestnut and then plowed two furrows 100 feet (30 m) apart all the way up to the railroad, just north of Second Street.

Since 1929, Atlantic is noted for the Atlantic Coca-Cola Bottling Company, which bottles and distributes drinks from The Coca-Cola Company to Iowa and parts of Minnesota, Wisconsin, Illinois, and Missouri.

== Geography ==
According to the United States Census Bureau, the city has a total area of 8.35 square miles (21.63 km^{2}), of which 8.32 square miles (21.55 km^{2}) is land and 0.03 square miles (0.08 km^{2}) is water.

=== Climate ===
According to the Köppen Climate Classification system, Atlantic has a hot-summer humid continental climate, abbreviated "Dfa" on climate maps.

Climate data for Atlantic, Iowa, 1991–2020 normals, extremes 1893–present
| Month | Jan | Feb | Mar | Apr | May | Jun | Jul | Aug | Sep | Oct | Nov | Dec | Year |
|---|---|---|---|---|---|---|---|---|---|---|---|---|---|
| Record high °F (°C) | 67 (19) | 76 (24) | 91 (33) | 94 (34) | 105 (41) | 106 (41) | 117 (47) | 111 (44) | 104 (40) | 96 (36) | 83 (28) | 72 (22) | 117 (47) |
| Mean maximum °F (°C) | 53.2 (11.8) | 58.5 (14.7) | 74.3 (23.5) | 84.1 (28.9) | 89.6 (32.0) | 93.4 (34.1) | 94.5 (34.7) | 93.5 (34.2) | 91.4 (33.0) | 85.0 (29.4) | 70.1 (21.2) | 57.0 (13.9) | 96.5 (35.8) |
| Mean daily maximum °F (°C) | 31.2 (−0.4) | 36.1 (2.3) | 50.0 (10.0) | 62.7 (17.1) | 73.1 (22.8) | 82.8 (28.2) | 86.1 (30.1) | 84.4 (29.1) | 78.2 (25.7) | 65.0 (18.3) | 49.2 (9.6) | 36.3 (2.4) | 61.3 (16.3) |
| Daily mean °F (°C) | 20.6 (−6.3) | 24.9 (−3.9) | 37.4 (3.0) | 49.3 (9.6) | 61.2 (16.2) | 71.3 (21.8) | 74.8 (23.8) | 72.5 (22.5) | 64.5 (18.1) | 51.5 (10.8) | 37.3 (2.9) | 25.8 (−3.4) | 49.3 (9.6) |
| Mean daily minimum °F (°C) | 9.9 (−12.3) | 13.7 (−10.2) | 24.8 (−4.0) | 35.9 (2.2) | 49.3 (9.6) | 59.8 (15.4) | 63.5 (17.5) | 60.6 (15.9) | 50.8 (10.4) | 38.1 (3.4) | 25.4 (−3.7) | 15.3 (−9.3) | 37.3 (2.9) |
| Mean minimum °F (°C) | −14.1 (−25.6) | −8.7 (−22.6) | 4.4 (−15.3) | 18.9 (−7.3) | 32.6 (0.3) | 44.6 (7.0) | 50.6 (10.3) | 48.2 (9.0) | 33.7 (0.9) | 20.5 (−6.4) | 7.6 (−13.6) | −6.8 (−21.6) | −18.6 (−28.1) |
| Record low °F (°C) | −37 (−38) | −36 (−38) | −32 (−36) | 4 (−16) | 17 (−8) | 32 (0) | 37 (3) | 33 (1) | 17 (−8) | 1 (−17) | −16 (−27) | −33 (−36) | −37 (−38) |
| Average precipitation inches (mm) | 0.86 (22) | 1.14 (29) | 1.89 (48) | 3.81 (97) | 5.43 (138) | 5.74 (146) | 4.40 (112) | 4.44 (113) | 3.35 (85) | 2.93 (74) | 1.65 (42) | 1.50 (38) | 37.14 (944) |
| Average snowfall inches (cm) | 5.1 (13) | 7.9 (20) | 3.4 (8.6) | 0.5 (1.3) | 0.0 (0.0) | 0.0 (0.0) | 0.0 (0.0) | 0.0 (0.0) | 0.0 (0.0) | 0.7 (1.8) | 2.0 (5.1) | 7.7 (20) | 27.3 (69.8) |
| Average precipitation days (≥ 0.01 in) | 6.1 | 7.2 | 7.8 | 11.5 | 13.6 | 11.6 | 10.1 | 8.9 | 8.6 | 8.9 | 6.4 | 6.7 | 107.4 |
| Average snowy days (≥ 0.1 in) | 5.0 | 5.2 | 1.8 | 0.8 | 0.0 | 0.0 | 0.0 | 0.0 | 0.0 | 0.4 | 1.5 | 4.6 | 19.3 |
Source 1: NOAA
Source 2: National Weather Service

== Demographics ==
Historical population
| Census | Pop. | Note | %± |
|---|---|---|---|
| 1870 | 1,200 | | — |
| 1880 | 3,662 | | 205.2% |
| 1890 | 4,351 | | 18.8% |
| 1900 | 5,046 | | 16.0% |
| 1910 | 4,560 | | −9.6% |
| 1920 | 5,329 | | 16.9% |
| 1930 | 5,585 | | 4.8% |
| 1940 | 5,802 | | 3.9% |
| 1950 | 6,480 | | 11.7% |
| 1960 | 6,890 | | 6.3% |
| 1970 | 7,306 | | 6.0% |
| 1980 | 7,789 | | 6.6% |
| 1990 | 7,432 | | −4.6% |
| 2000 | 7,257 | | −2.4% |
| 2010 | 7,112 | | −2.0% |
| 2020 | 6,792 | | −4.5% |
U.S. Decennial Census

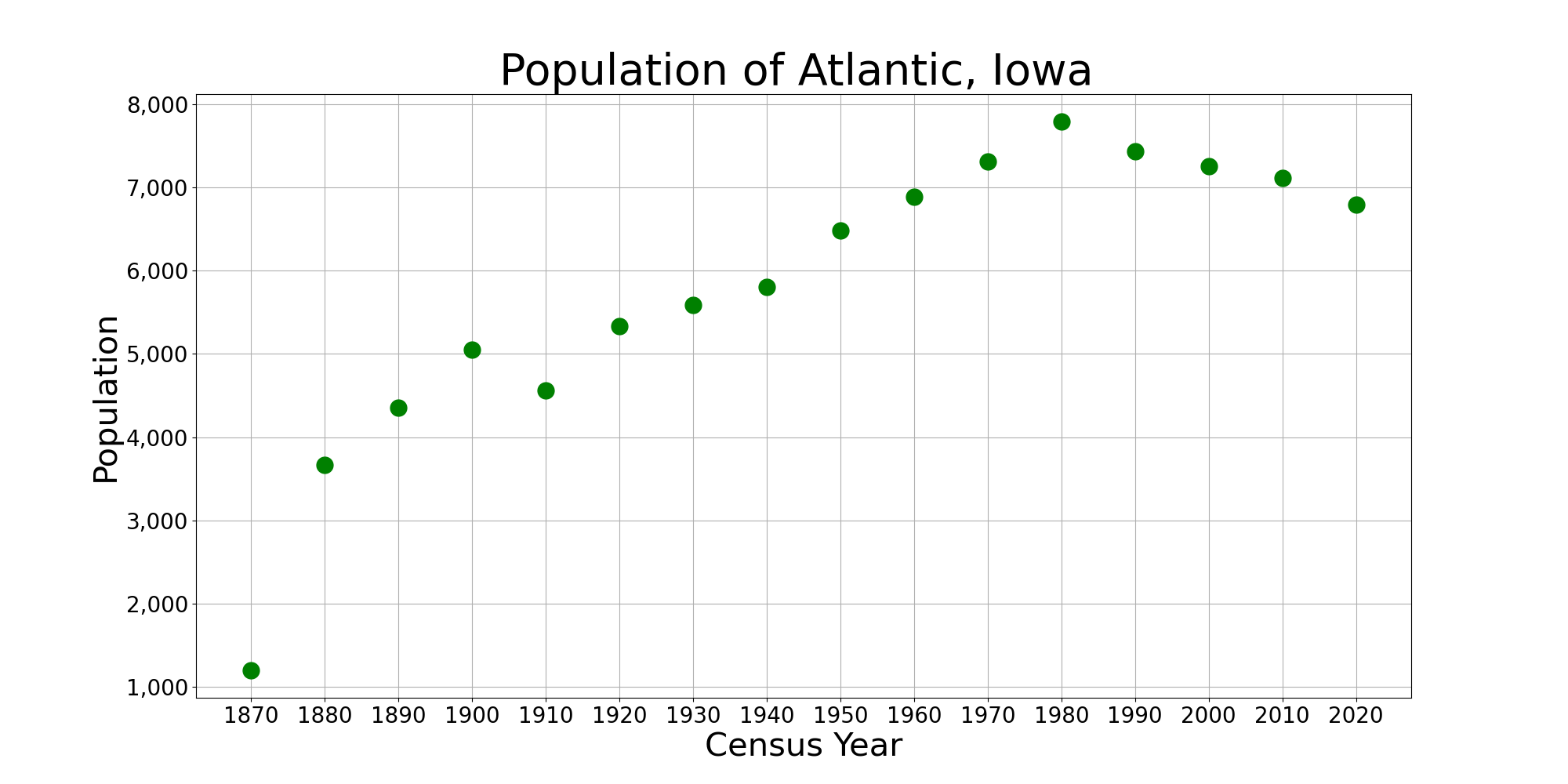
The population of Atlantic, Iowa from US census data

=== 2020 census ===
As of the 2020 census, Atlantic had a population of 6,792, with 3,106 households and 1,749 families residing in the city. The population density was 818.8 inhabitants per square mile (316.2/km^{2}). There were 3,379 housing units at an average density of 407.4 per square mile (157.3/km^{2}).

The median age was 43.9 years. 22.1% of residents were under the age of 18, and 24.2% were 65 years of age or older. 24.2% of residents were under the age of 20; 4.6% were between the ages of 20 and 24; 22.2% were from 25 to 44; and 24.7% were from 45 to 64. The gender makeup of the city was 47.8% male and 52.2% female. For every 100 females there were 91.5 males, and for every 100 females age 18 and over there were 88.2 males age 18 and over.

Of the 3,106 households, 24.1% had children under the age of 18 living with them. Of all households, 42.0% were married-couple households, 7.0% were cohabitating couples, 19.6% were households with a male householder and no spouse or partner present, and 31.4% were households with a female householder and no spouse or partner present. 43.7% of all households were non-families. About 38.3% of all households were made up of individuals, and 18.5% had someone living alone who was 65 years of age or older.

There were 3,379 housing units, of which 8.1% were vacant. The homeowner vacancy rate was 2.2% and the rental vacancy rate was 10.8%.

97.3% of residents lived in urban areas, while 2.7% lived in rural areas.

Racial composition as of the 2020 census
| Race | Number | Percent |
|---|---|---|
| White | 6,379 | 93.9% |
| Black or African American | 22 | 0.3% |
| American Indian and Alaska Native | 10 | 0.1% |
| Asian | 21 | 0.3% |
| Native Hawaiian and Other Pacific Islander | 68 | 1.0% |
| Some other race | 63 | 0.9% |
| Two or more races | 229 | 3.4% |
| Hispanic or Latino (of any race) | 200 | 2.9% |

=== 2010 census ===
At the 2010 census there were 7,112 people, 3,137 households, and 1,906 families living in the city. The population density was 854.8 inhabitants per square mile (330.0/km^{2}). There were 3,399 housing units at an average density of 408.5 per square mile (157.7/km^{2}). The racial makup of the city was 97.0% White, 0.2% African American, 0.3% Native American, 0.3% Asian, 0.5% Pacific Islander, 1.0% from other races, and 0.6% from two or more races. Hispanic or Latino of any race were 2.6%.

Of the 3,137 households, 26.8% had children under the age of 18 living with them, 47.0% were married couples living together, 9.9% had a female householder with no husband present, 3.9% had a male householder with no wife present, and 39.2% were non-families. 34.3% of households were one person and 15.7% were one person aged 65 or older. The average household size was 2.21 and the average family size was 2.80.

The median age was 44.3 years. 22.6% of residents were under the age of 18; 7.1% were between the ages of 18 and 24; 20.9% were from 25 to 44; 27.1% were from 45 to 64; and 22% were 65 or older. The gender makeup of the city was 47.9% male and 52.1% female.

=== 2000 census ===
At the 2000 census there were 7,257 people, 3,126 households, and 1,969 families living in the city. The population density was 890.4 inhabitants per square mile (343.8/km^{2}). There were 3,354 housing units at an average density of 411.5 per square mile (158.9/km^{2}). The racial makup of the city was 98.65% White, 0.25% African American, 0.12% Native American, 0.22% Asian, 0.06% Pacific Islander, 0.41% from other races, and 0.29% from two or more races. Hispanic or Latino of any race were 0.79%.

Of the 3,126 households, 28.5% had children under the age of 18 living with them, 51.0% were married couples living together, 8.8% had a female householder with no husband present, and 37.0% were non-families. 33.7% of households were one person and 18.0% were one person aged 65 or older. The average household size was 2.22 and the average family size was 2.81.

Age spread: 23.0% under the age of 18, 7.4% from 18 to 24, 24.3% from 25 to 44, 22.3% from 45 to 64, and 23.0% 65 or older. The median age was 42 years. For every 100 females, there were 89.3 males. For every 100 females age 18 and over, there were 83.5 males.

The median household income was $33,370 and the median family income was $41,168. Males had a median income of $30,691 versus $20,271 for females. The per capita income for the city was $17,832. About 6.3% of families and 12.1% of the population were below the poverty line, including 17.5% of those under age 18 and 10.6% of those age 65 or over.

== Education ==
It is within the Atlantic Community School District. Atlantic High School is the local school district.

== Media ==
Newspaper

Atlantic, Iowa is one of the smallest communities in Iowa to have a daily newspaper, the Atlantic News-Telegraph. The editor E.P. Chase of the newspaper was awarded the 1934 Pulitzer Prize for Editorial Writing.

Radio

Atlantic is home to three radio stations. KSOM 96.5 FM is a 100,000 watt station that reaches more than 22 counties with studios in Atlantic. KSOM features local news at the top of the hour as well as Bill O'Reilly news and commentary daily and 12 locally originated ag reports each weekday. KSOM broadcasts Iowa State Sports, NASCAR and high school sports coverage.

KS 95.7 offers classic rock music and is the home and away voice of the Atlantic High School Trojans. Many of the Atlantic High school sporting events are also live video streamed by KS 95.7.

Meredith Communications is the owner of KSOM and KS 95.7 and is also the publisher of the website westerniowatoday.com and a daily electronic newspaper called The Daily. KJAN 1220 AM which features a variety music format and is licensed to Wireless Communications Corp.. KJAN also broadcasts on FM translator 101.1. KJAN AM 1220/FM 101.1 features local news, sports, weather, farm and information 24 hours a day. Listen to Iowa Hawkeye football and basketball, St. Louis Cardinals baseball and Kansas City Chiefs football on KJAN.

== Transportation ==
Atlantic is served by Interstate 80 on 3 exits approximately 7–10 to the north, the primary one being a multiplex of US-6 and US-71. U.S. Route 71 turns south right as it gets to town, heading towards Kansas City. US-6 runs mostly east/west through downtown, providing connection to Council Bluffs/Omaha and Des Moines.

=== Railroads ===
Atlantic is served by the Iowa Interstate Railroad, a successor to the Chicago, Rock Island and Pacific Railroad. Until 1970 the Rock Island Railroad Atlantic depot served a daily Council Bluffs - Chicago train. The railroad has one daily job, a local known as “The Rover”, that starts and ends its shift in Atlantic. From Atlantic service is provided to customers between Hancock and Des Moines. The town also sees two daily through freights. Daily Amtrak service is in Omaha, 58 miles to the west and Creston, 58 miles to the southeast.

=== Major highways ===
- US 6
- US 71
- Iowa 83

=== Buses ===
Atlantic is served by daily intercity buses from Burlington Trailways. While the stop, located at 64975 Boston Rd, is named Atlantic, it is actually located over six miles from town, off Interstate 80.

== Notable people ==
- Duane Acker (1931–2024), former president of Kansas State University
- Don A. Allen (1907–1983), member of California State Assembly and of Los Angeles City Council
- Dave Becker (born 1957), American former professional football defensive back
- Harlan J. Bushfield (1882–1948), Republican U.S. senator and governor of South Dakota
- William G. Cambridge (1931–2004), former United States federal court judge
- Blake Curd (born 1967), Physician and South Dakota state legislator
- Jack Drake (1934–2015), state representative in Iowa
- Steve H. Hanke (born 1942), professor of economics, adviser to presidents
- Ryan Hawkins (born 1997), an American professional basketball player
- Rick Heiserman (born 1973), former Major League Baseball pitcher
- Frederick C. Loofbourow (1874–1949), U.S. representative from Utah
- Shannon McCormick (born 1971), actor and voice actor
- Ethel T. Wead Mick (1881–1957), founder of Masonic Job's Daughters
- Michael Peterson (born 1982), American football tight end.
- Ed Podolak (born 1947), football player for Iowa Hawkeyes
- Glen R. Smith, chairman and CEO, Farm Credit Administration (2019–2022)
- Guy D. Smith (1907–1981), Distinguished international soil scientist.
- William Appleman Williams (1921–1990), president of Organization of American Historians.
- M. L. Wilson (1885–1969), Former American Undersecretary of the U.S. Department of Agriculture
- Jeff Worthington (1961–2023), gold medal-winning American paralympic athlete
- Lafayette Young (1848–1926), Republican senator from Iowa

== See also ==
- T-Bone Trail
